= Investigative journalism (disambiguation) =

Investigative journalism is a form of journalism in which reporters deeply investigate a single topic of interest, such as serious crimes, political corruption, or corporate wrongdoing. Practitioners sometimes use the terms "watchdog reporting" or "accountability reporting".

Investigative journalism may also refer to:

- Centre for Investigative Journalism, London, England
- Institute for Investigative Journalism, at Concordia University, Montreal, Quebec, Canada
- Schuster Institute for Investigative Journalism at Brandeis University
- Wisconsin Center for Investigative Journalism, nonprofit organization housed at the University of Wisconsin–Madison
- International Consortium of Investigative Journalists

== See also ==
- List of years in investigative journalism
- Center for Investigative Reporting (CIR), nonprofit news organization based in Emeryville, California
- Investigative Journalism, an episode from the first season of Community
- Philippine Center for Investigative Journalism (PCIJ), a nonprofit media organization based in the Philippines
