= WyoFile =

Wyoming newspaper

- Formation: 2008; 18 years ago
- Type: Nonprofit (501(c)(3))
- Tax ID no.: 27-0410642
- Purpose: Covering politics
- Headquarters: Lander, Wyoming
- Region served: Wyoming
- Affiliations: Institute for Nonprofit News; States Newsroom
- Revenue: ▲$1.15 million (2023)
- Expenses: ▲$1.27 million (2023)
- Website: Official website

WyoFile is a nonprofit news organization covering Wyoming news and politics founded in 2008, and incorporated in 2009. The stated mission of WyoFile is to inform and engage Wyoming through in-depth reporting in the public interest.

WyoFile was conceived when Rone Tempest and other recently retired journalists in Wyoming were conversing about the decline of local media. They imagined a digital focused organization which could cover news across the state. Early on, WyoFile's writing was done predominantly by freelancers, and the organization frequently faced insolvency, however by 2011 it had gained 2 full time staffers. Its first grant was from the George B. Storer Foundation. In 2022, 56% of WyoFile's revenue came from individual donors. The newspaper has also gotten funding from philanthropic organizations like the Knight Foundation and American Journalism Project. The organization employed 16 people as of July 2026.

== Notable stories ==
In 2008, Rone Tempest filed the first in a series of stories uncovering financial mismanagement at North American Power Group, eventually leading to a $14.4 million dollar fine and 18-month sentencing of Michael J. Ruffatto.

In late 2021, Angus M. Thuermer Jr. published a story about a group of Missouri hunters who crossed from one section of public land to another parcel at a spot where the corners meet in an act known as corner crossing. Formally known as Iron Bar Holdings, LLC v. Cape, the case was a landmark legal dispute in Carbon County, Wyoming. It established that it is legal for the public to step over the corners where public and private lands meet—without physically touching private land—to access public property.

Reporting by Tennessee Watson (WyoFile), Kamila Kudelska (Wyoming Public Media) and Jennifer Kocher exposed workplace harassment, discrimination and retaliation at the Wyoming National Guard headquarters. Their reporting led to the passage of two pieces of legislation in 2022 and a governor-established executive oversight committee.

Maggie Mullen and Jasmine Hall’s (Jackson Hole News & Guide) coverage of "Checkgate" spurred legislative and criminal investigations, the expansion of legislative ethics training, and an executive order from Gov. Mark Gordon to ban the solicitation, delivery or acceptance of campaign contributions in state buildings and on executive branch-controlled property.

== Awards ==
- Top of Rockies
  - 2024, 33 awards (more than any other newsroom in the four-state region)
  - 2025, 36 awards
  - 2026, 34 awards (more than any other newsroom in the four-state region)
- Society of Environmental Journalists
  - 2020 2nd Place, National Reporting
  - 2020 3rd Place, Kevin Carmody Award for Outstanding Investigative Reporting
