= 2024 United States Senate election in Connecticut =

- November 5, 2024
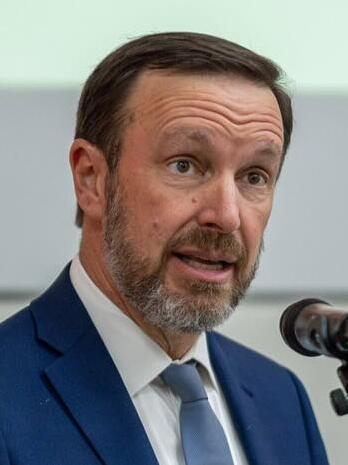

Nominee	Chris Murphy	Matthew Corey
Party	Democratic	Republican
Alliance	Working Families
Popular vote	1,000,695	678,256
Percentage	58.58%	39.70%
- Murphy: 40–50% 50–60% 60–70% 70–80% 80–90% >90% Corey: 40–50% 50–60% 60–70% 70–80% Tie: 40–50%
U.S. senator before election
Chris Murphy
Democratic
Elected U.S. Senator
Chris Murphy
Democratic

The 2024 United States Senate election in Connecticut was held on November 5, 2024, to elect a member of the United States Senate to represent the state of Connecticut. Primary elections took place on August 13, 2024. Incumbent Democratic Senator Chris Murphy won re-election to a third term with 58.58% of the vote in a rematch with his 2018 opponent Matthew Corey. This was the first election in Murphy's senatorial career where he did not carry Windham County, as well as the first time Windham voted Republican in Connecticut's Class 1 Senate seat since 1988. (Note: Windham County also voted against the Democratic nominee in Connecticut's Class 3 seat in 2022, and voted against the Democratic nominee in 2006, where it was won by Joe Lieberman, the then-incumbent Democratic Senator who ran a third-party campaign under the Connecticut for Lieberman party banner.)

Republicans have not won a Senate election in Connecticut since 1982.

== Democratic primary ==
=== Candidates ===
==== Nominee ====
- Chris Murphy, incumbent U.S. senator

=== Endorsements ===
Chris Murphy

U.S representatives

- Gabby Giffords, U.S. representative from Arizona's 8th congressional district (2007–2012)

Organizations

- Feminist Majority PAC
- Giffords
- Humane Society Legislative Fund
- Jewish Democratic Council of America
- Joint Action Committee for Political Affairs
- J Street PAC
- League of Conservation Voters
- Natural Resources Defense Council
- Planned Parenthood Action Fund
- Population Connection Action Fund
- Sierra Club

Political parties

- Connecticut Democratic Party

=== Fundraising ===
Campaign finance reports as of June 30, 2024
Candidate	Raised	Spent	Cash on hand
Chris Murphy (D)	$13,279,807	$8,327,715	$9,736,809
Source: Federal Election Commission

=== Results ===
Democratic primary results
Party	Candidate	Votes	%
Democratic	Chris Murphy (incumbent)	Unopposed	
Total votes		—N/a	100.0

== Republican primary ==
=== Candidates ===
==== Nominee ====
- Matthew Corey, bar owner, perennial candidate, and nominee for U.S. Senate in 2018

==== Eliminated in primary ====
- Gerry Smith, first selectman (Note: Mayor) of Beacon Falls

=== Endorsements ===
Matthew Corey

Organizations

- Connecticut Republican Assembly
Gerry Smith

Political Parties

- Connecticut Republican Party

=== Fundraising ===
Campaign finance reports as of June 30, 2024
Candidate	Raised	Spent	Cash on hand
Matthew Corey (R)	$30,770 (Note: $5,000 of this total was self-funded by Corey)	$19,926	$28,212
Robert Hyde (R)	$743	$696	$47
Gerry Smith (R)	$61,506	$55,895	$5,611
Source: Federal Election Commission

=== Results ===
Results by municipality: Corey—80–90% Corey—70–80% Corey—60–70% Corey—50–60% Tied Smith—50–60% Smith—60–70% Smith—70–80% Smith—80–90%

Republican primary results
Party	Candidate	Votes	%
Republican	Matthew Corey	19,228	54.74%
Republican	Gerry Smith	15,900	45.26%
Total votes		35,128	100.00%

== Green primary ==
=== Candidates ===
==== Declared ====
- Justin Paglino, co-chair of the Connecticut Green Party and nominee for Connecticut's 3rd congressional district in 2020 and 2022

== General election ==
=== Predictions ===
Source	Ranking	As of
The Cook Political Report	Solid D	November 9, 2023
Inside Elections	Solid D	November 9, 2023
Sabato's Crystal Ball	Safe D	November 9, 2023
Decision Desk HQ/The Hill	Safe D	June 8, 2024
Elections Daily	Safe D	May 4, 2023
CNalysis	Solid D	November 21, 2023
RealClearPolitics	Solid D	August 5, 2024
Split Ticket	Safe D	October 23, 2024
538	Solid D	October 23, 2024

=== Polling ===
Poll source	Date(s) administered	Sample size (Note: Key: A – all adults RV – registered voters LV – likely voters V – unclear)	Margin of error	Chris Murphy (D)	Matthew Corey (R)	Undecided
MassINC Polling Group (Note: Poll sponsored by CT Mirror)	September 12–18, 2024	800 (LV)	± 3.7%	51%	35%	–

=== Results ===
Council of government results: Murphy 50–60% 60–70% / Corey 40–50% 50–60%

2024 United States Senate election in Connecticut
Party	Candidate	Votes	%	±%
Democratic	Chris Murphy	953,646	55.83	▼0.97
Working Families	Chris Murphy	47,049	2.75	▲0.02
Total	Chris Murphy (incumbent)	1,000,695	58.58	▼0.95
Republican	Matthew Corey	678,256	39.70	▲0.35
Cheaper Gas Groceries	Robert F. Hyde	14,879	0.87	N/A
Green	Justin Paglino	14,422	0.84	▲0.36
Write-in		7	0.00	Steady
Total votes		1,708,259	100.00	N/A
Democratic hold				

==== By county ====
County	Chris Murphy Democratic		Matthew Corey Republican		Various candidates Other parties		Total votes cast	
County	Fairfield	265,597	60.3%	168,556	38.27%	6,273	1.42%	440,426
Hartford	259,568	62.19%	150,084	35.96%	7,744	1.85%	417,396	
Litchfield	49,766	48.0%	52,285	50.43%	1,633	1.57%	103,684	
Middlesex	54,503	57.21%	39,156	41.1%	1,603	1.68%	95,262	
New Haven	224,025	58.25%	153,763	39.98%	6,828	1.77%	384,616	
New London	77,429	58.24%	52,861	39.76%	2,655	2.0%	132,945	
Tolland	43,691	54.94%	34,433	43.3%	1,404	1.76%	79,528	
Windham	26,116	48.01%	27,118	49.85%	1,168	1.15%	54,402	
Total	1,000,695	58.58%	678,256	39.7%	29,308	1.71%	1,708,259	

Counties that flipped from Democratic to Republican

- Windham (largest town: Windham)

=== By congressional district ===
Murphy won all five congressional districts.

District	Murphy	Corey	Representative
1st	62.4%	35.7%	John B. Larson
2nd	55.5%	42.7%	Joe Courtney
3rd	59.4%	38.7%	Rosa DeLauro
4th	61.5%	37.1%	Jim Himes
5th	54.5%	43.9%	Jahana Hayes

== Notes ==
Partisan clients
