= Circle of Blue =

- Categories: Environment, Policy, Water, Food, Energy, Climate, Journalism, Science
- Frequency: daily
- First issue: February 2006
- Country: United States
- Based in: United States
- Language: English
- Website: https://circleofblue.org

Circle of Blue is a U.S.-based nonprofit news, information, and convening organization reporting on fresh water worldwide.

== History ==
From its founding in 2003 and until 2018, Circle of Blue was fiduciary sponsored by the Pacific Institute, the water-climate research organization, and became an independent 501(c)3 nonprofit organization in 2018.

In 2007, Circle of Blue was recognized by the Clinton Global Initiative for its innovative reporting about water security worldwide.

In 2021, the three-part series, WASH Within Reach, reported the global status of universal access to water, sanitation and hygiene through the lens of the global COVID-19 pandemic. Supported by the Conrad N. Hilton Foundation, the series was republished by the Wilson Center and World Economic Forum.

In 2022, long-form reporting included toxic algae in the Great Lakes, elevated cancer rates in rural Nebraska, and the drought in the American West. Reporter Brett Walton received the Eric and Wendy Schmidt Award for Excellence in Science Communications for local and regional reporting. In 2024, its founder received a Centennial Innovation Award from the Rockefeller Foundation for creating a "cumulative feedback loop" of information and impact.

== See also ==
- Institute for Nonprofit News (member)
