= Chalkbeat =

Nonprofit news organization that covers education

- Formation: 2014
- Founder: Elizabeth Green
- Founded at: New York City and Colorado
- Merger of: Gotham Schools, EdNews Colorado
- Type: Non-profit organization
- Region served: Chicago, Colorado, Detroit, Indiana, Newark, New York, Philadelphia, and Tennessee
- Official language: English
- Board of directors: Jill Barkin, Elizabeth Green, Kang-Xing (KX) Jin, David Rousseau, Ann Sardini, Gideon Stein, Becca Van Dyck, Karen Wishart, Roberto Yañez
- Affiliations: Institute for Nonprofit News
- Website: chalkbeat.org

Chalkbeat is a non-profit news organization that covers education in several American communities. Its mission is to "inform the decisions and actions that lead to better outcomes for children and families by providing deep, local coverage of education policy and practice." It aims to cover "the effort to improve schools for all children, especially those who have historically lacked access to a quality education". Its areas of focus include under-reported stories, education policy, equity, trends, and local reporting.

Chalkbeat was founded as GothamSchools in 2008 by Elizabeth Green and Philissa Cramer. It merged with EdNews Colorado, founded by Alan Gottlieb, in 2013, and then redesigned and relaunched the website as Chalkbeat one year later.

In 2020, Chalkbeat created Votebeat, a similar newsroom focused on local election rules and processes, before restructuring under the parent organization Civic News Company in 2023 and adding Healthbeat in 2024.

== History ==
Chalkbeat began as a merger of GothamNews/GothamSchools in New York City and EdNews Colorado in Denver. GothamSchools was founded in 2008 by Elizabeth Green and Philissa Cramer, who started off with a local New York City education blog. From the beginning, they received requests to expand their coverage to other parts of the country. The organization was initially funded by Open Plans, a technology non-profit founded by Mark Gorton. EdNews Colorado started as a magazine and was developed by Alan Gottlieb.

GothamNews and EdNews Colorado merged in January 2013 and were relaunched jointly as a national network, first known as Education News Network and then as Chalkbeat. Green said the organizations "decided to merge because it's hard to build a sustainable business around journalism". Though the existing brands had loyal followings, "there is power in numbers. It made sense that we should all have one name." The new organization started additional bureaus in Memphis and Indianapolis. These new bureau locations were chosen for having a lot of changes or possibilities in their local education policy as well as local foundation support.

Chalkbeat raised $2.2 million in revenue in 2013, most of which came from philanthropic funding and about one third from ads and job boards listings. As the organization has expanded, it has attracted more funding from foundational donors and individuals. Donors include local foundations as well as the Bill & Melinda Gates Foundation, the Ford Foundation, and the Walton Family Foundation, each of which gives between $200,000 and $400,000 per year as of 2016.

As of 2015 in New York City, Chalkbeat's competitors include three daily newspapers and a public radio station with an education-focused blog. Another key competitor is Capital Education, owned by Politico.

In the year 2016, Chalkbeat had approximately 250,000 visitors per month. About one quarter of readers work for education non-profits, another quarter are teachers, 11 percent are researchers or policymakers, and 10 percent are parents, according to Green. Their target audience includes both "education insiders" and interested people who care about education inequality.

In 2016, Chalkbeat clarified its expectations, standards and editorial practices by unveiling a formal "code of ethics" that covers all its bureaus. Chalkbeat has also introduced an open-source impact tracking platform called MORI (Measures of Our Reporting's Influence).

Chalkbeat expanded to Detroit in early 2017, and later that year it announced plans to expand to Chicago and Newark in 2018.

In 2020, The Philadelphia Public School Notebook joined Chalkbeat to create Chalkbeat Philadelphia. As of 2020, Chalkbeat has eight bureaus where it reports news regularly: Chicago, Colorado, Detroit, Indiana, Newark, New York City, Philadelphia, and Tennessee.

In February 2023, Chalkbeat reorganized into having a parent organization called the Civic News Company to avoid confusion around the relationship between Chalkbeat and Votebeat, which was launched in 2020, as well as allowing room for growth.

In 2024, Healthbeat was launched to cover health topics.

== Votebeat ==
In October 2020, Chalkbeat launched Votebeat, a project to report on local issues related to voting, starting with the 2020 United States elections and with plans to continue through the 2022 midterm election. Votebeat has received funding from the Institute for Nonprofit News as well as foundations and other donors. By May 2022, Votebeat became a permanent newsroom, with a national focus as well as Arizona, Michigan, Pennsylvania and Texas as its first four states, with plans to have a presence in all 50 states. Wisconsin Watch partnered with Votebeat in 2024, making Wisconsin its fifth state. As of 2024, Votebeat is the only news outlet in America focused solely on elections and voting at the local level. Votebeat publishes its stories without a paywall and allows any outlet to republish them for free. Ahead of the tallying of the votes for the 2024 United States presidential election, Votebeat assembled almost 100 voting experts to answer questions from journalists in a Slack channel. Votebeat is also a member of the Institute for Nonprofit News.

== Elizabeth Green ==
Elizabeth Green is the co-founder, CEO, and editor-in-chief of Chalkbeat. Green, who is based in New York City, studied teaching methods in the U.S. and Japan for six years. Her book Building a Better Teacher, launched with a New York Times magazine story, discusses the principles behind teaching skills and how complicated teaching can be. She believes that good teachers "are not born, they're made", and that "teaching must itself be taught". The book covers how teachers can be more effective and how policymakers can improve educators' skills.

Green previously worked for U.S. News & World Report and The New York Sun, where she covered education. She realized the importance of covering news from pre-school education to higher education, including issues ranging from school policies to politics, and wanted to write about education on a local level. That is why Chalkbeat mainly focuses on education news in local communities.

== Code of ethics ==
Chalkbeat originally adopted a code of ethics to govern the conduct of its team members in 2015. In 2016 it announced a new formal code of ethics in order to formalize existing practices and ensure consistency within the organization. Its code of ethics draws inspiration from other nonprofit news organizations, including The Marshall Project, ProPublica, The Texas Tribune, and the Center for Investigative Reporting, as well as from professional organizations such as the Education Writers Association and the Society for Professional Journalists.

== Impact tracking (MORI) ==
MORI (Measures of Our Reporting's Influence) is an open-source WordPress plugin for tracking and reporting the impact of an organization's journalism, which Chalkbeat developed in 2014. It has "deep ties to Google Analytics, as well as its own built-in taxonomies for detailed story types and impact types." It was initially only used privately within the organization, but after two years, Chalkbeat announced the open-source release of the MORI Impact Tracker plugin, as the first product in the MORI Platform. The impact tracker allows users to record impacts individually, review impacts over time by searching and sorting them, and export lists of impacts to a spreadsheet for further data crunching and sharing. Users can attach impacts to a particular WordPress post or a broader category or tag or stand alone. MORI also has a dashboard widget to display the latest impacts.

MORI includes article-tagging, event-tracking and goal measurement. Journalists categorize the article by type and then identify the target audience before posting or publishing an article. They can also add a narrative description and an impact tag to the article page in the content management system (CMS) if there is a meaningful offline event related to the article. MORI requires editors to set goals before publishing, and metrics are provided in terms of progress to those goals. Goals can be set in categories such as Content Production, Content Consumption, and Engagement.

At first, Chalkbeat was unsure whether its journalists would use MORI, but the reception was positive, with reporters and editors enthusiastic about making use of the data it produced.

== Reception ==
Chalkbeat has been praised for offering balanced, nuanced reporting on local education issues; Cornelia Grumman wrote that the organization's reporting "humanizes schools" instead of buying into a simplistic negative narrative.

The organization's funding model has led to criticism from those who see a conflict of interest and feel that Chalkbeat is too focused on "a reform-minded policy community". Chalkbeat says that it has editorial independence and that its coverage of reforms is not always positive.

== See also ==
- Institute of Nonprofit News, another network of nonprofit newsrooms in the United States
- States Newsroom, another network of nonprofit newsrooms around the United States that also publishes under a Creative Commons license
