= Chris Murphy =

American politician (born 1973)

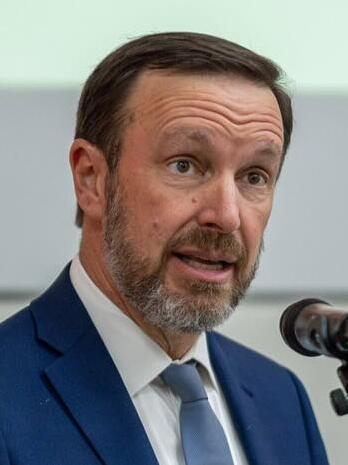
- Murphy in 2025

Deputy Secretary of the Senate Democratic Caucus
- Incumbent
- Assumed office January 3, 2025 Serving with Brian Schatz
- Leader: Chuck Schumer
- Preceded by: Brian Schatz

United States Senator from Connecticut
- Incumbent
- Assumed office January 3, 2013 Serving with Richard Blumenthal
- Preceded by: Joe Lieberman

Member of the U.S. House of Representatives from Connecticut's 5th district
- In office January 3, 2007 – January 3, 2013
- Preceded by: Nancy Johnson
- Succeeded by: Elizabeth Esty

Member of the Connecticut State Senate from the 16th district
- In office January 8, 2003 – January 3, 2007
- Preceded by: Stephen Somma
- Succeeded by: Sam Caligiuri

Member of the Connecticut House of Representatives from the 81st district
- In office January 6, 1999 – January 8, 2003
- Preceded by: Angelo Fusco
- Succeeded by: Bruce Zalaski

Personal details
- Born: Christopher Scott Murphy; August 3, 1973 (age 53) White Plains, New York, U.S.
- Party: Democratic
- Other political affiliations: Working Families
- Spouse: Cathy Holahan (m. 2007; div. 2026)
- Children: 2
- Education: Williams College (BA); University of Connecticut (JD)
- Website: Senate website Campaign website
- Murphy's voice Murphy supporting the Bipartisan Safer Communities Act; Recorded June 23, 2022

Christopher Scott Murphy (born August 3, 1973) is an American lawyer, author, and politician serving since 2013 as the junior United States senator from Connecticut. A member of the Democratic Party, he served from 2007 to 2013 in the United States House of Representatives, representing Connecticut's 5th congressional district.

Before being elected to Congress, Murphy was a member of both chambers of the Connecticut General Assembly, serving two terms each in the Connecticut House of Representatives (1999–2003) and the Connecticut Senate (2003–2007).

Murphy ran for the U.S. Senate in 2012 after longtime incumbent Joe Lieberman announced his retirement. Murphy defeated former Connecticut secretary of state Susan Bysiewicz in the Democratic primary and Republican nominee Linda McMahon in the general election. Aged 39 at the time, Murphy was the youngest senator of the 113th Congress. He was reelected in 2018 and 2024.

== Early life and education ==
Murphy was born on August 3, 1973, in White Plains, New York, to Catherine A. (née Lewczyk) and Scott L. Murphy. He is of Irish and Polish descent. Murphy's father is a corporate lawyer who served as the managing partner of Shipman & Goodwin, a Hartford law firm, and his mother is a retired ESL teacher at Hanmer Elementary School in Wethersfield, Connecticut. Murphy has two younger siblings.

Murphy graduated from Wethersfield High School, where he was student body president and founded his high school's Young Democrats. He received his Bachelor of Arts degree from his father's alma mater, Williams College; Murphy spent his junior year studying abroad at Exeter College, Oxford through the Williams-Exeter Programme at Oxford. He earned his Juris Doctor degree from the University of Connecticut School of Law.

On May 19, 2013, Murphy received an honorary Doctor of Humane Letters degree from the University of New Haven.

== Career ==
In 1996, Murphy managed Charlotte Koskoff's unsuccessful campaign for the House of Representatives against Nancy Johnson; a decade later, Murphy himself unseated Johnson. From 1997 to 1998, Murphy worked for Connecticut State Senate Majority Leader George Jepsen. Murphy was first elected to office in 1997, when he won a seat on Southington's planning and zoning commission.

== Connecticut House of Representatives (1999–2003) ==
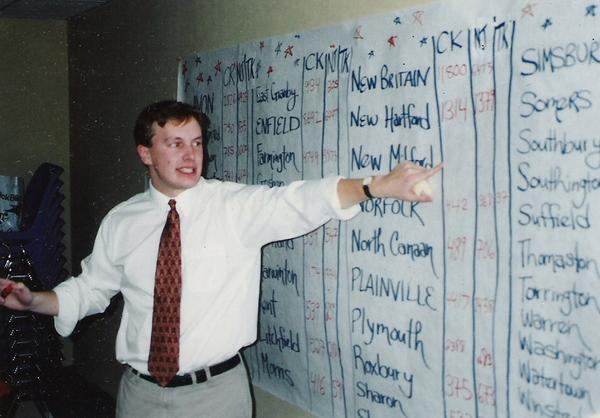
Murphy on election night, 1996

=== Elections ===
In 1998, at age 25, Murphy challenged 14-year incumbent Republican State Representative Angelo Fusco. Murphy was endorsed by the six largest labor unions in the state. The CT Employees Independent Union endorsed Murphy, the first time the union had endorsed Fusco's opponent. Fusco described himself as a union member, an environmentalist, and a moderate. Murphy defeated Fusco, 55%–45%. In 2000, he was reelected, defeating Barbara Morelli, 68%–32%.

=== Tenure ===
As early as March 1999, Murphy criticized U.S. Congresswoman Nancy Johnson's vote to impeach President Bill Clinton. In 2001, he co-sponsored a bill to eliminate child poverty. He proposed legislation to give free tuition to students of the state's community-technical colleges. He proposed legislation to ban smoking at state colleges and universities. He co-sponsored a bill to create an earned income tax credit. He was a supporter of LGBT rights as early as 2002. During his tenure, he served on the Judiciary Committee.

== Connecticut State Senate (2003–2007) ==
=== Elections ===
After two terms in the Connecticut House, Murphy ran for a seat in the Connecticut State Senate in 2002. The open 16th district had been held by a Republican for more than a decade. In the general election, he defeated Republican State Representative Ann Dandrow, 53%–47%. He was reelected in 2004, defeating Republican Christopher O'Brien, 60%–37%.

=== Tenure ===
In 2003, Murphy joined the Clean Car Alliance and supported California-like environmental standards on auto manufacturers.

In 2004, Murphy supported a bill to ban smoking in restaurants and bars.

In 2005, Murphy authored legislation establishing the new Office of Child Protection, to "better coordinate advocacy for abused and neglected children". Murphy also wrote Public Act 05–149, an act permitting stem-cell research while prohibiting human cloning. The act, signed into law by Governor Jodi Rell, made Connecticut the third state in the nation to permit taxpayer-subsidized stem-cell research.

During his tenure in the State Senate, Murphy was one of the first ten co-sponsors of a civil union bill that passed the General Assembly in 2005. On his Senate campaign website, Murphy summarized his stance: "Let me be clear and simple: LGBT rights are human rights. Marriage equality and nondiscrimination in the military, workplace, classroom and healthcare system, based on real or perceived sexual orientation and gender identity, are civil rights that must be protected under law." During his tenure he chaired the Public Health Committee.

== U.S. House of Representatives (2007–2013) ==
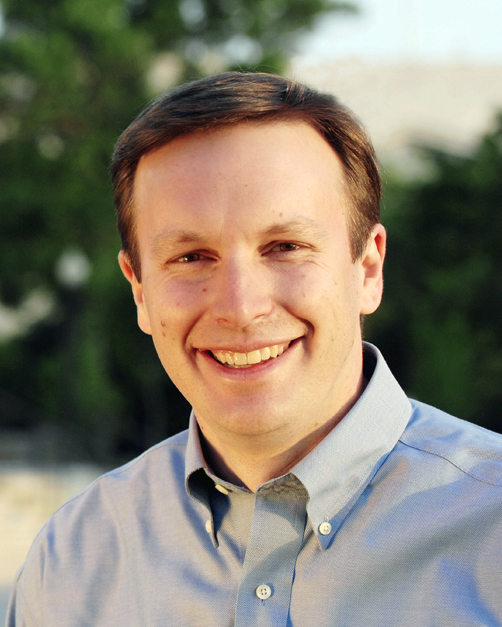
Murphy in 2011 as Representative

=== Elections ===
Murphy chose not to run for reelection to the State Senate, instead running for the U.S. House seat held by 12-term incumbent Republican Nancy Johnson. To challenge Johnson, he moved from Southington to Cheshire. Murphy was elected in 2006 with 56% of the vote, defeating Johnson by about 22,000 votes.

He carried 35 of the district's 41 cities and towns, including several that had reliably supported Johnson for decades. He defeated Johnson by a significant margin in her hometown of New Britain, which she had represented for over 30 years in both the state senate and in Congress. He was reelected in 2008 and 2010 with 60% and 54% of the vote, respectively.

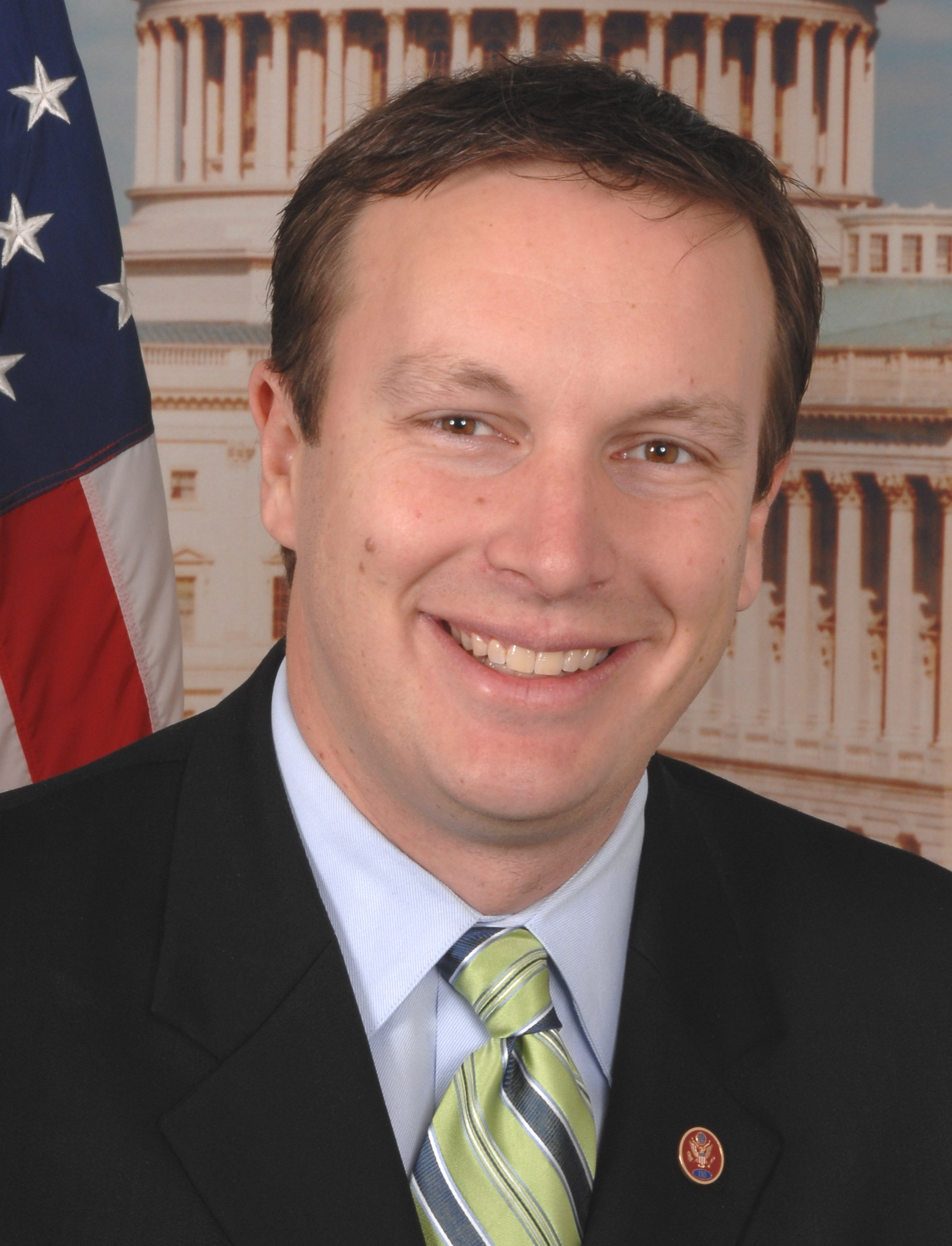
Murphy during the 110th Congress

=== Tenure ===
Murphy has received high ratings from progressive groups such as Americans for Democratic Action, NARAL Pro-Choice America, and various labor unions; and low scores from conservative groups as the Club for Growth, American Conservative Union, and FreedomWorks.

In 2008, Murphy sent House Majority Leader Steny Hoyer a letter expressing support for increased oil drilling as part of a bipartisan energy bill.

Murphy supports reform of federal supportive housing programs, which assist low-income people with severe disabilities. In 2008, the House of Representatives passed the "Frank Melville Supportive Housing Investment Act", which Murphy authored to modernize and streamline Section 811, which governs federal supportive housing grants.

Murphy has called for the closure of the Guantanamo Bay detention camp, but in 2011, he voted to extend provisions of the Patriot Act.

==== Health care reform ====
In 2009, Murphy helped draft HR 3200, the House health-care reform bill. Murphy defended his role in supporting the bill at a contentious town hall meeting in Simsbury in August 2009.

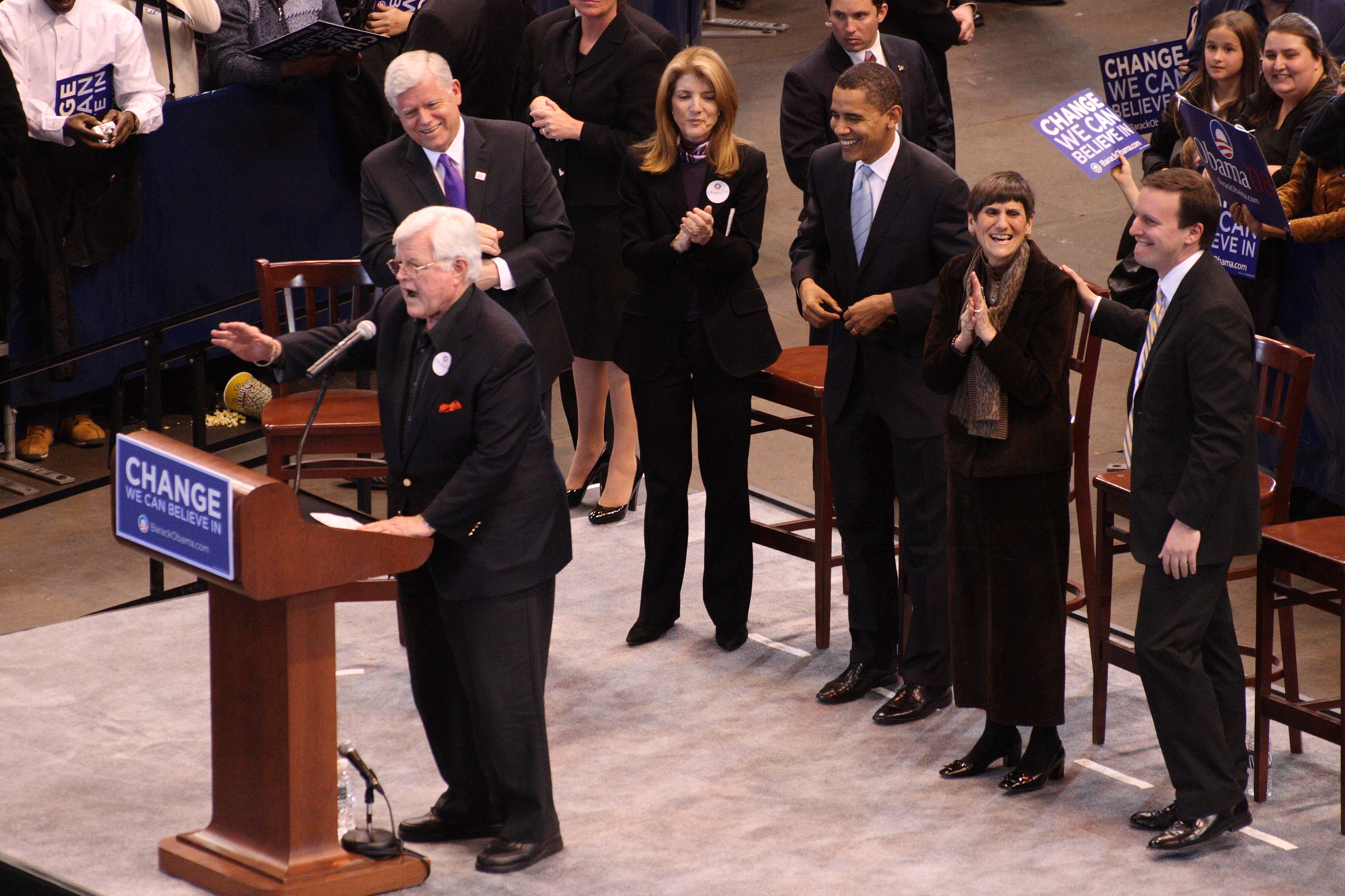
Ted Kennedy and Murphy at a Barack Obama rally in February 2008

A longtime supporter of health insurance reform, Murphy is a strong proponent of the public option, which entails the creation of an independent, government-sponsored health insurance plan to compete with private companies. He has argued that such a plan would not require government financing and would help introduce competition into monopolized health insurance markets and help reduce costs.

==== Congressional and judicial ethics reform ====
In May 2007, Murphy organized a group of freshman House members to support the creation of an independent, nonpartisan ethics panel to review complaints filed against House members. He has been credited with helping to shape the independent Office of Congressional Ethics, which was passed into law by the House in March 2008.

Murphy sponsored a bill that would subject Supreme Court justices to the same ethical code that applies to other federal judges and suggested in 2011 the possibility of an investigation of whether Justice Clarence Thomas had committed ethical violations that would justify removing him from office. The matter in question was Thomas's connection to Harlan Crow and other supporters of the Republican Party. Murphy circulated a draft letter to other members of Congress asking the House Judiciary Committee leadership to hold a hearing on the Supreme Court Transparency and Disclosure Act, which would end the Supreme Court's immunity to judicial ethics laws.

As a member of the House Oversight and Government Reform Committee, Murphy was highly critical of for-profit government contractors operating in Iraq, which functioned with little government oversight and scrutiny. He introduced the Government Funding Transparency Act of 2008, which required private companies that do the majority of their business with the federal government to publicly disclose their top executives' salaries.

Two home invasions occurred in Murphy's district in 2007 and 2008; the latter, in Cheshire, was especially brutal, with the rape and murder of a mother and her two daughters. In response, Murphy proposed making home invasion a federal crime.

Murphy has been a proponent of the proposed New Haven-Hartford-Springfield Commuter Rail Line, an effort to use existing Amtrak railroad tracks for daily commuter service on par with Southwestern Connecticut's Metro-North service into New York. In 2008, Murphy successfully added an amendment to rail legislation making it easier for Amtrak and the state of Connecticut to cooperate on the rail project. The line began operation in 2018.

Murphy proposed reforms of the nation's "missing persons" databases, introducing "Billy's Law" in 2009 to improve coordination of law-enforcement efforts to find missing persons. The legislation was named in honor of Billy Smolinski Jr., a onetime resident of Murphy's district who disappeared in 2004.

=== House committee assignments ===
- Committee on Foreign Affairs
  - Subcommittee on the Middle East and South Asia
- Committee on Oversight and Government Reform
  - Subcommittee on Health Care, District of Columbia, Census and the National Archives
  - Subcommittee on Technology, Information Policy, Intergovernmental Relations and Procurement Reform

=== Caucus memberships ===
- New Democrat Coalition

== U.S. Senate (2013–present) ==
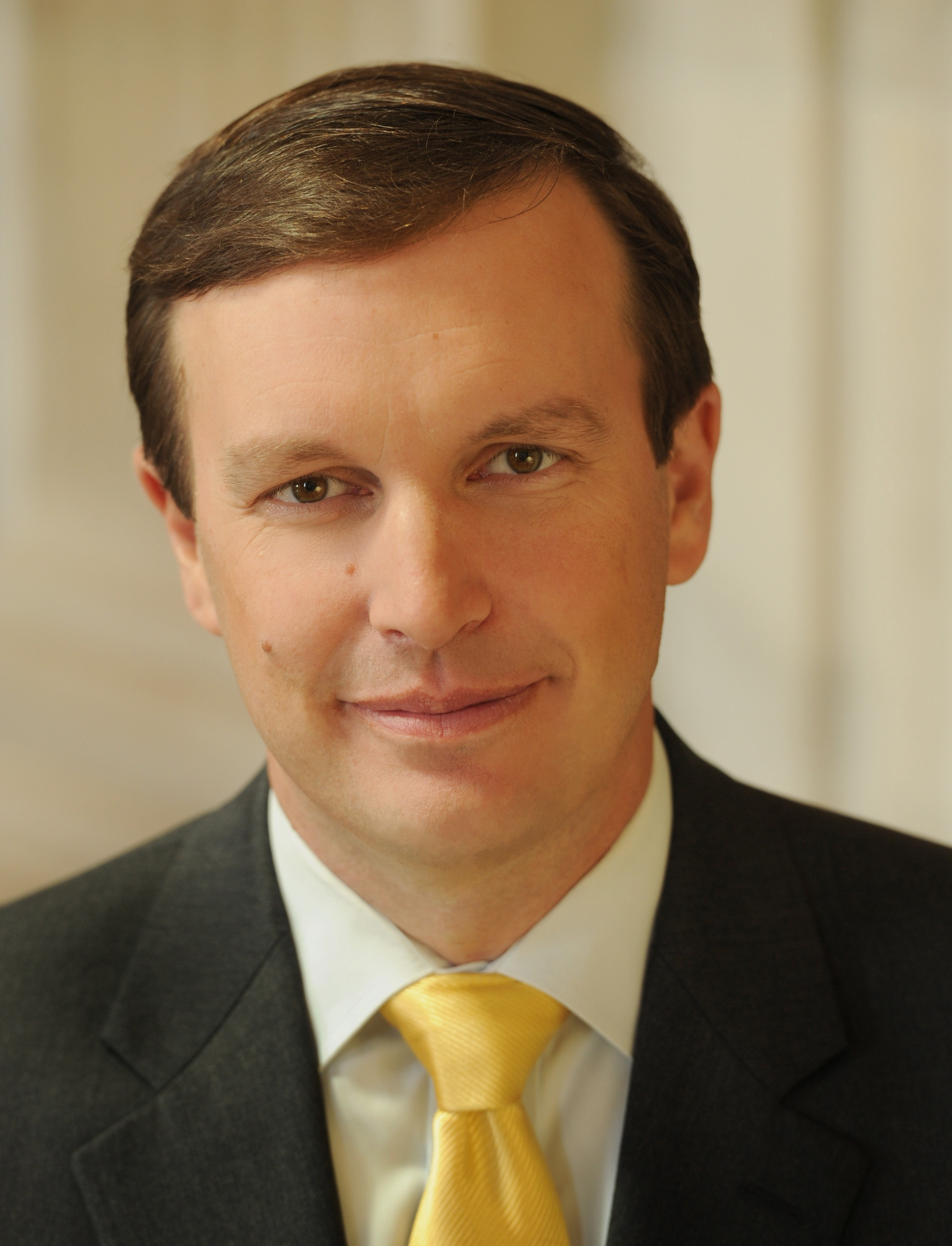
Official portrait, 113th Congress

=== Elections ===
==== 2012 ====
On January 20, 2011, Murphy announced his candidacy for the U.S. Senate seat held by Joe Lieberman, who was retiring. It was announced in mid-July that a group spearheaded by a state Capitol lobbyist was forming a Super PAC for his campaign, hoping to raise $1 million to combat a possible opponent.

Murphy defeated former Connecticut Secretary of State Susan Bysiewicz in the Democratic primary and Republican nominee Linda McMahon in the general election. He received 55% of the vote, winning every county except Litchfield County. It was the most expensive political race in Connecticut history at the time and one of the most expensive Senate races of 2012.

==== 2018 ====
Murphy was reelected in 2018, defeating Republican nominee Matt Corey with 59.5% of the vote.

==== 2024 ====
In 2024, Murphy was elected to a third term. He was unanimously selected as the Democratic nominee and defeated Republican nominee Matt Corey, Green nominee Justin C. Paglino, and Cheaper Gas Groceries Party nominee Robert Finley Hyde.

=== 2016 presidential election ===
Murphy was on the shortlist of candidates Hillary Clinton considered for her running mate. The Washington Post in 2016 and The New York Times in 2012 compared him to a "young Bill Clinton", and called him "one of the future leaders of the party" and a young rising star, respectively.

=== Tenure ===
Murphy took office as the junior United States senator for Connecticut on January 3, 2013. In the Senate, he has worked on funding for transportation and infrastructure, the preservation of Long Island Sound, growing small farms and promoting Connecticut manufacturing.

In 2016, Murphy walked 126 miles across Connecticut, listening to constituents and holding daily town hall meetings. He repeated the walk in 2017, covering 106 miles and holding five town hall meetings.

In early 2020, Murphy secretly met with Iranian foreign minister Javad Zarif on the sidelines of Munich Security Conference. They discussed U.S. nationals being detained in Iran, Iran's involvement in the Yemeni Civil War, and Iranian-backed militias in Iraq. In a post on Medium.com, Murphy wrote: "I have no delusions about Iran—they are our adversary, responsible for the killing of thousands of Americans and unacceptable levels of support for terrorist organizations throughout the Middle East. But I think it's dangerous to not talk to your enemies. Discussions and negotiations are a way to ease tensions and reduce the chances for crisis."

In the wake of the January 6 United States Capitol attack in 2021, Murphy called for the removal of Donald Trump from office. He also said he would lead an investigation into the security breaches and law enforcement response during the attack.

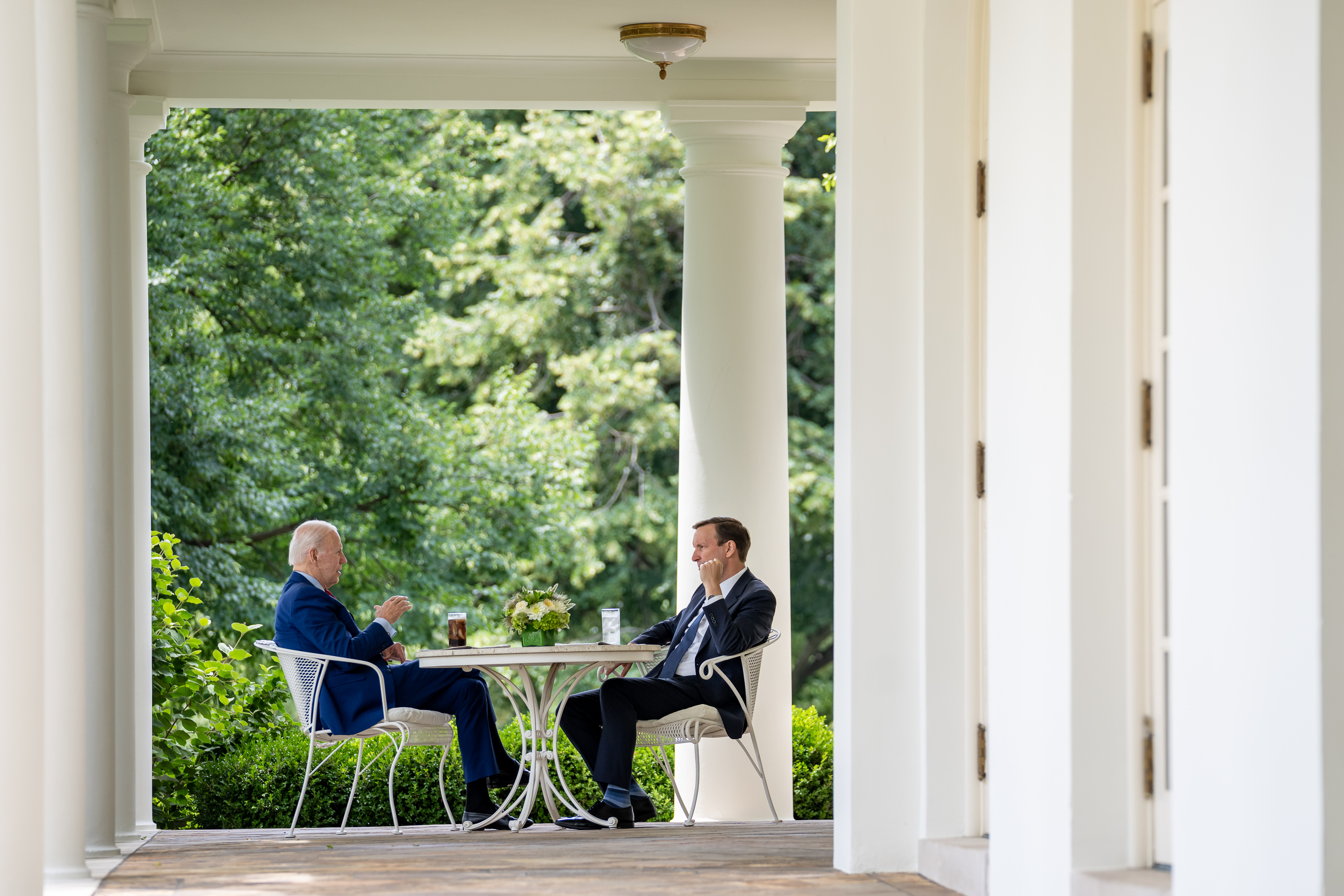
Murphy with President Joe Biden at the White House in June 2022

Commenting on the day of the fall of Kabul, Murphy said, "Our priority now needs to be evacuating American personnel and as many of our Afghan partners as humanly possible. I firmly believe that President Biden made the right decision by standing by the Trump administration's decision to bring our troops home and end the longest war in our nation's history."

Murphy with President Joe Biden and Senators who are opposed to Israel's admission to the U.S. Visa Waiver Program, June 2023

Since the 2024 United States presidential election, Murphy has emerged as a prominent critic of Donald Trump and his agenda. He has delivered many condemnations of Trump on social media platforms, increasing his following by 223 percent and receiving more than 29 million impressions. Media outlets including The Guardian, The New York Times, and NBC News have listed Murphy as a possible presidential candidate in 2028. He has also focused on and expressed alarm over what he called "the erosion of American democracy and government corruption in the second Trump administration".

=== 119th United States Congress committee assignments ===
Murphy currently serves on the following committees:

- United States Senate Committee on Appropriations
- Committee on Foreign Relations
- Committee on Health, Education, Labor, and Pensions

=== Caucus memberships ===
- Expand Social Security Caucus
- Congressional Caucus on Turkey and Turkish Americans
- Senate Taiwan Caucus

== Political positions ==
Murphy has been generally regarded as a mainstream liberal Democrat, but in the 2020s, he has become a prominent advocate of left-leaning economic populism, urging Democrats to adopt an "aggressively populist" message to win back working-class voters. Murphy is a member of the U.S. Senate's Fight Club.

While historically known for his expertise on foreign policy, gun control advocacy, and bipartisan negotiating skills, Murphy has recently focused on aggressively opposing Donald Trump and his perceived authoritarianism, and addressing what he calls a "crisis of meaning" in U.S. society and an identity crisis among American men.

=== Abortion ===
Murphy is pro-choice. When Roe v. Wade was overturned in June 2022, Murphy called it a "disaster".

=== Economic issues ===
Murphy has introduced two pieces of legislation, the American Jobs Matter Act and the 21st Century Buy American Act, to close loopholes in the existing Buy American laws and encourage the U.S. government to purchase American-made goods.

In May 2018, Murphy was one of 12 senators to sign a letter to Federal Labor Relations Authority (FLRA) chair Colleen Kiko urging the FLRA to end efforts to close its Boston regional office until Congress debated the matter, adding that the FLRA's closure of its regional offices would cause staff to be placed farther away from the federal employees whose rights they protect.

Murphy has spoken out against outsourcing. He has been an outspoken critic of neoliberalism since 2022 and has instead advocated big-tent politics and left-wing populism to win back working-class voters and build a winning coalition.

After Kamala Harris lost the 2024 presidential election, Murphy urged a significant revamp of Democratic Party policy, saying that neoliberalism, growing social and economic alienation of many Americans from the party, and a perception of elitism have contributed to the party's loss of working class voters. Murphy believes the Democratic Party should embrace left-wing populism as an antidote to right-wing populism, reiterating that Third Way economic policies have eroded the party's once broad appeal.

=== Foreign policy ===
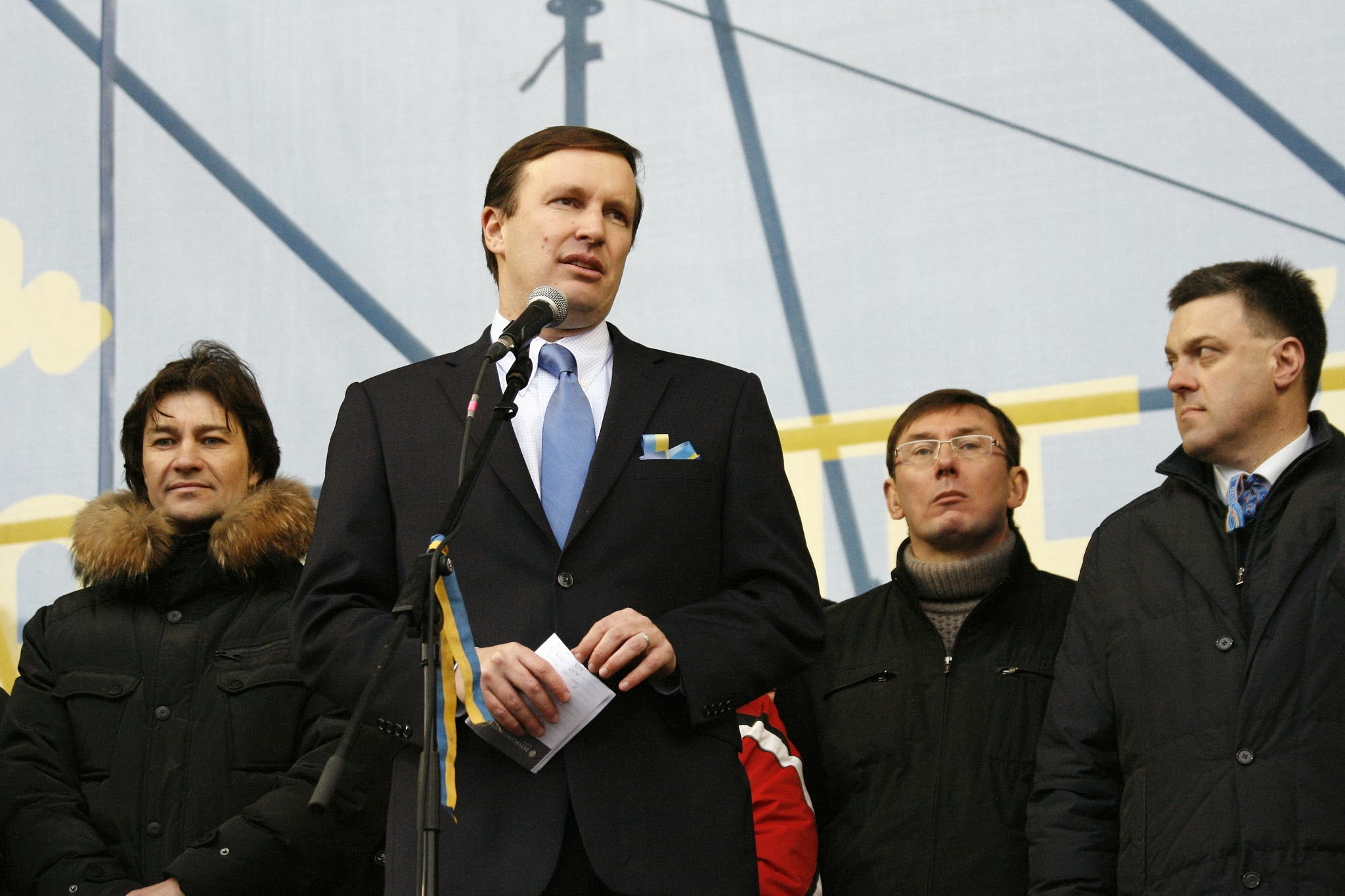
Murphy with Svoboda party leader Oleh Tyahnybok at Euromaidan in Kyiv, Ukraine, December 2013

Murphy was one of the first members of Congress to come out in opposition to US support for the Saudi-led military campaign in Yemen, which was launched in 2015. In a speech on January 29, 2016, he recommended that the US stop supporting this campaign and suspend military sales to Saudi Arabia until it received assurances that the war would not distract from Saudi efforts against al-Qaeda and ISIS and Saudi Arabia reduced its worldwide support of Wahhabism.

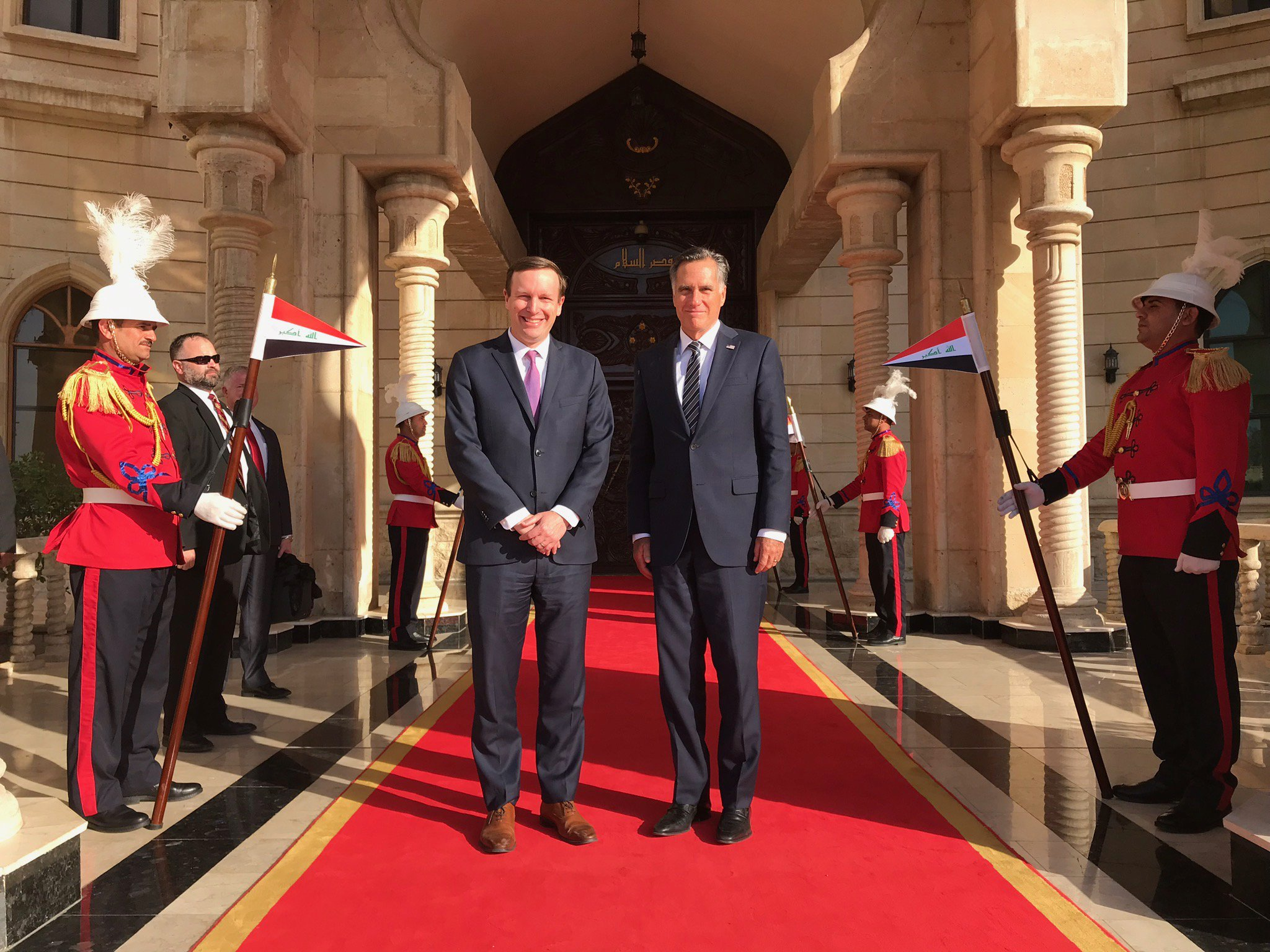
Murphy with Mitt Romney in Iraq

Murphy is a member of the Senate Foreign Relations Committee and the ranking Democratic member of the subcommittee on the Middle East and Counter-terrorism. In June 8, 2015, edition of Foreign Affairs, Murphy co-authored "Principles for a Progressive Foreign Policy", proposing a framework for a Democratic foreign policy strategy.

In November 2017, Murphy accused the United States of complicity in the war crimes committed in Yemen by the Saudi-led military coalition and in Yemen's humanitarian crisis, saying: "Thousands and thousands inside Yemen today are dying....This horror is caused in part by our decision to facilitate a bombing campaign that is murdering children and to endorse a Saudi strategy inside Yemen that is deliberately using disease and starvation and the withdrawal of humanitarian support as a tactic." In October 2018, Murphy wrote that if the reports of Jamal Khashoggi's murder were true, "it should represent a fundamental break" in Saudi Arabia–United States relations. Murphy, Bernie Sanders, and Mike Lee advanced a vote to co-sponsor a resolution that would require the President to "withdraw troops in or "affecting" Yemen within 30 days unless they are fighting al Qaeda. In February 2019, Murphy was one of seven senators to reintroduce legislation requiring sanctions on Saudi officials involved in Khashoggi's murder and seeking to address support for the Yemen civil war by prohibiting some weapons sales to Saudi Arabia and U.S. military refueling of Saudi coalition planes.

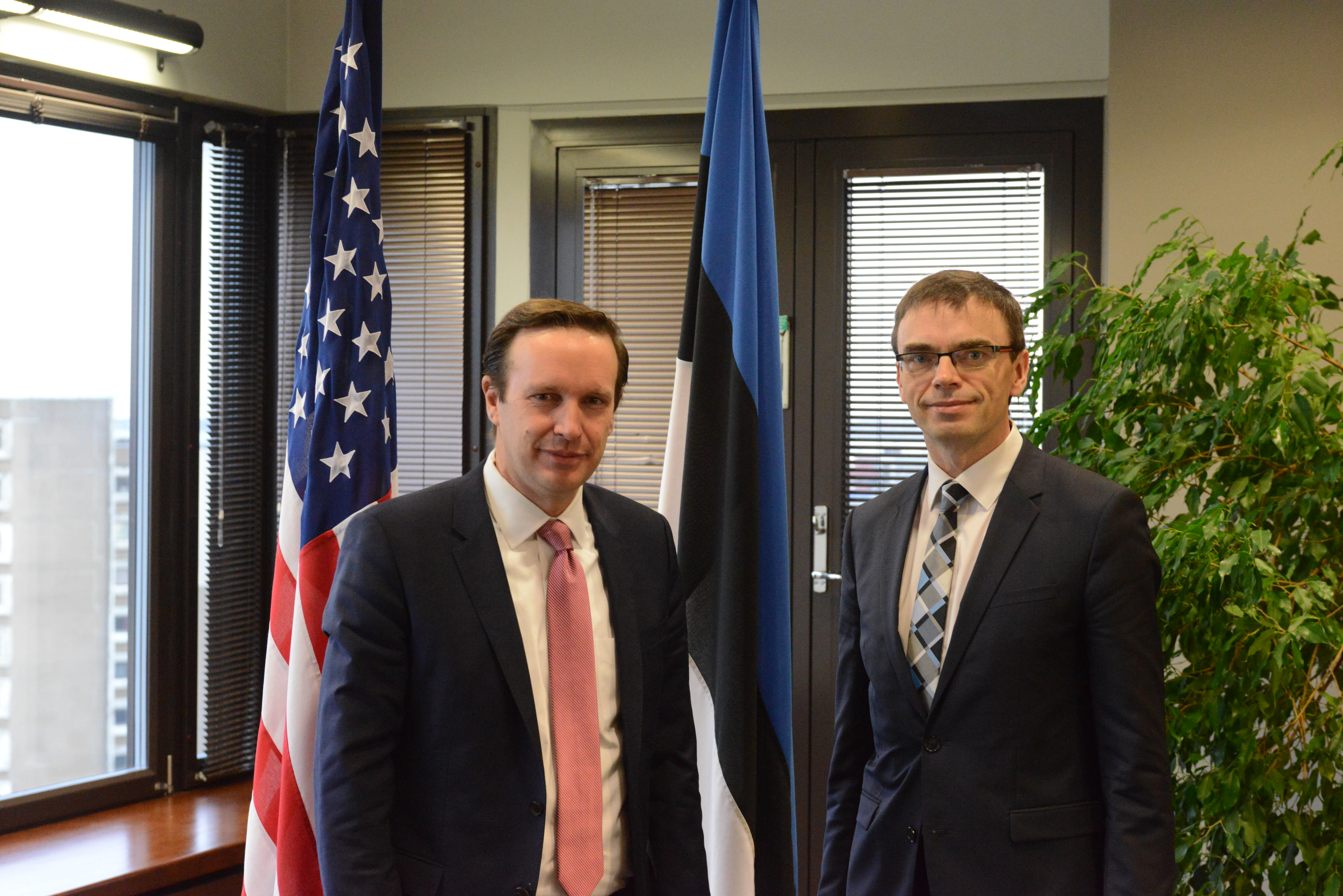
Murphy with Estonian Foreign Minister Sven Mikser in 2016

Murphy is one of the Senate's most vociferous critics of Russia. Murphy holds that Russia will remain a permanent, persistent threat to the United States and its security interests regardless of the incumbent regime in the country. At a 2019 event at the Atlantic Council, Murphy professed the need for NATO allies to understand that the US has been always "far behind Russia in understanding our vulnerabilities". At the same event, Murphy echoed the sentiments of Lithuanian and Georgian foreign ministers that Russia's imperialist nature will always put it at odds with the US and that little will change until Russia as a "captive state of aggregate territories" changes its nature.

In March 2016, Murphy and Republican Senator Rob Portman co-authored the bipartisan Countering Foreign Propaganda and Disinformation Act. Congressman Adam Kinzinger introduced the House version of the bill. After the 2016 U.S. presidential election, worries grew that propaganda spread and organized by the Russian government swayed the election's outcome, and members of Congress took action to safeguard the national security of the United States by advancing legislation to monitor propaganda from external threats. On November 30, 2016, legislators approved a measure within the National Defense Authorization Act to ask the U.S. State Department to take action against foreign propaganda through an interagency panel. The legislation authorized funding of $160 million over two years. The initiative was developed through the Countering Foreign Propaganda and Disinformation Act.

In September 2016, in advance of UN Security Council resolution 2334 condemning Israeli settlements in the occupied Palestinian territories, Murphy signed an AIPAC-sponsored letter urging President Obama to veto "one-sided" resolutions against Israel.

In July 2017, Murphy voted in favor of the Countering America's Adversaries Through Sanctions Act that placed sanctions on Iran, Russia, and North Korea.

In December 2017, Murphy criticized President Trump's decision to recognize Jerusalem as the capital of Israel, saying, "It needs to be done at the right time and in the right manner."

In December 2018, Trump ordered the withdrawal of U.S. troops from Syria. Murphy said: "I support withdrawing troops, but we must also rejoin a diplomatic process that the Trump administration has left to other powers, and we need a surge in humanitarian relief. That's the only way we can protect the Syrian people against a Turkish incursion or regime reprisals.

In April 2019, Murphy was one of 34 senators to sign a letter to President Trump encouraging him "to listen to members of your own Administration and reverse a decision that will damage our national security and aggravate conditions inside Central America", asserting that Trump had "consistently expressed a flawed understanding of U.S. foreign assistance" since becoming president and that he was "personally undermining efforts to promote U.S. national security and economic prosperity" by preventing the use of Fiscal Year 2018 national security funding. The senators argued that foreign assistance to Central American countries created less migration to the U.S. by helping to improve conditions in those countries.

In January 2020, Murphy wrote to FBI Director Christopher A. Wray, urging the FBI to "investigate the allegations" that Saudi Arabia "illegally compromised and stole personal data" from Jeff Bezos, the owner of The Washington Post, as part of a possible effort to "influence, if not silence, the Washington Post's reporting on Saudi Arabia".

In May 2020, Murphy voiced his opposition to Israel's plan to annex parts of the Israeli-occupied West Bank.

In January 2024, Murphy voted against a resolution proposed by Senator Bernie Sanders to apply the human rights provisions of the Foreign Assistance Act to U.S. aid to Israel's military. The proposal was defeated, 72 to 11. On February 7, 2024, Murphy said he would support an amendment requiring weapons sold internationally to be used in compliance with U.S. law, international humanitarian law, and the laws of armed conflict.

In March 2024, Murphy was one of 19 Democratic senators to sign a letter to the Biden administration urging the U.S. to recognize a "nonmilitarized" Palestinian state after the Gaza war.

In March 2025, Murphy said, "The White House has become an arm of the Kremlin."

In April 2025, Murphy voted for a pair of resolutions, proposed by Sanders, to cancel the Trump's administration's sales of $8.8 billion in bombs and other munitions to Israel. The proposals were defeated, 82 to 15.

In June 2025, after Trump made remarks about bombing Iranian nuclear facilities, Murphy told reporters, "It appears that we have only delayed Iran's nuclear program by a few months. The president's assertions that we have dismantled the program are false. Knowledge cannot be eradicated through bombing."

Murphy has criticized the Trump administration's handling of the 2026 Iran war, calling its strategy "incoherent", "bungled", and "mismanaged". He also argued that the administration had bypassed Congress in initiating military action against Iran and introduced a War Powers Resolution aimed at limiting U.S. involvement in unauthorized hostilities against Iran. Murphy also linked the conflict to rising fuel prices and broader economic pressures in the United States.

Following reports of a U.S.–Iran memorandum of understanding in June 2026, Murphy questioned its legitimacy, saying he had not been briefed on its contents and expressing uncertainty about whether it formally existed. He called the reported agreement favorable to Iran and "essentially a surrender", while criticizing the lack of transparency toward Congress.

=== Gun control ===
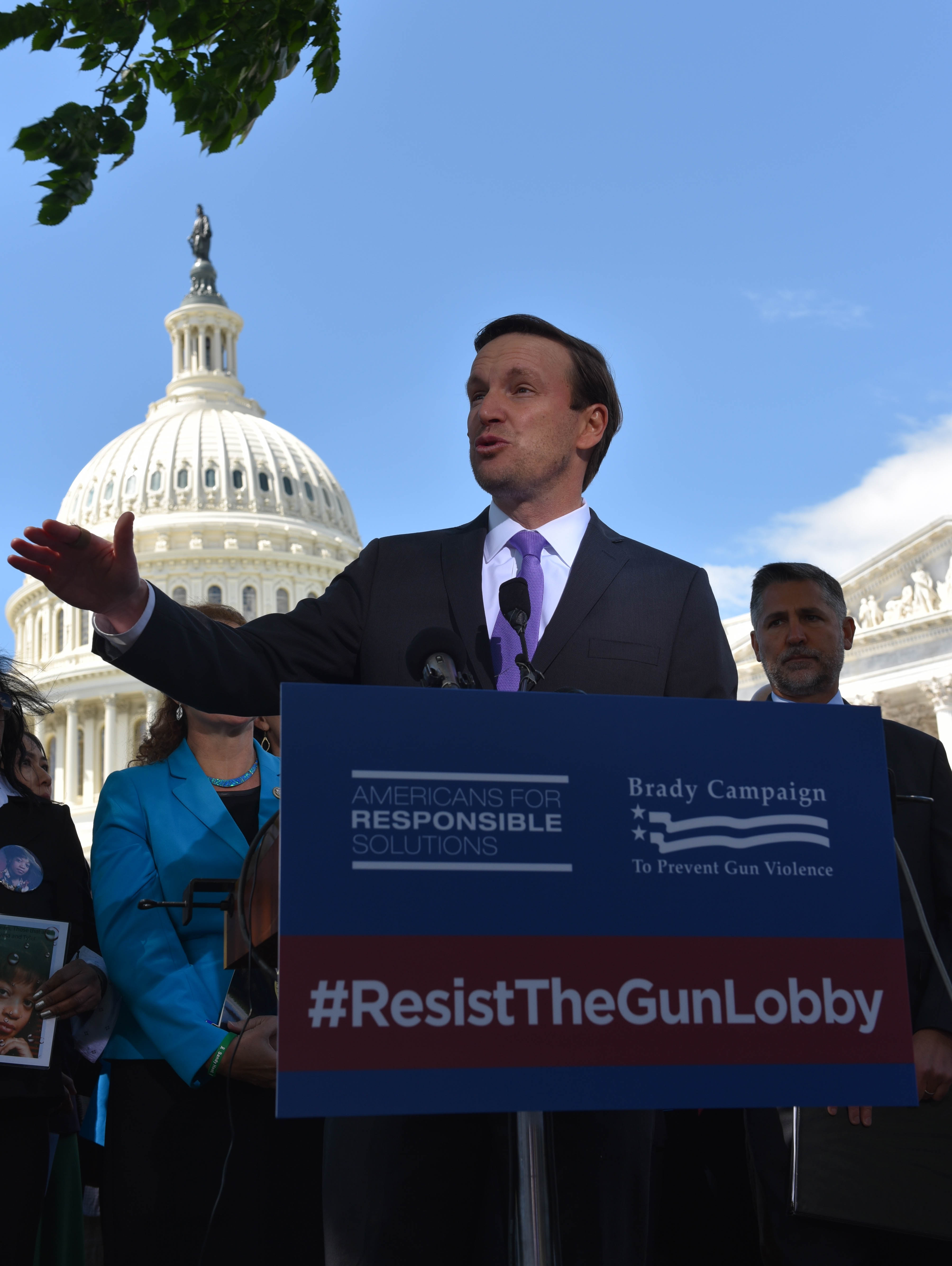
Murphy speaks in favor of gun control in 2017.

Murphy supports gun control and has been a leading advocate for further legislation relating to it. He supports a national assault-weapon ban and introduced such a ban in 2017 and 2023. Murphy has an F rating with the NRA Political Victory Fund and in 2020 published a book on gun control, The Violence Inside Us: A Brief History of an Ongoing American Tragedy.

The Sandy Hook Elementary School shooting occurred in Newtown, Connecticut, in Murphy's House district near the end of his term. In the aftermath of the shooting, he became a leading voice in the movement to prevent gun violence, supporting numerous policies, including universal background checks and ending the ban on gun violence research at the CDC. Murphy supported the bipartisan Manchin-Toomey background checks proposal, which would have strengthened and expanded the existing background-check system and established a National Commission on Mass Violence to study in-depth all the causes of mass violence. When the proposal failed to meet the 60-vote threshold for advancement, Murphy said, "This is a day when the Republican filibuster stood in the way of 90% of Americans."

In his first month in office, he criticized the National Rifle Association and Apple Inc. for a video game involving shooting with guns that was labeled appropriate for children as young as four.

On June 24, 2015, Murphy said, "Since Sandy Hook there has been a school shooting, on average, every week"; The Washington Post called this statement misleading. On June 15–16, 2016, Murphy staged a filibuster regarding gun control following the Orlando nightclub shooting, the deadliest mass shooting in U.S. history at the time. The filibuster entered the list of the top 10 longest filibusters in U.S. history. In the wake of the shooting, Murphy said, "This phenomenon of near-constant mass shootings happens only in America—nowhere else" and "this epidemic will continue without end if Congress continues to sit on its hands and do nothing—again."

After the 2017 Sutherland Springs church shooting, Murphy and Senator John Cornyn introduced the bipartisan Fix NICS Act to ensure criminal records are submitted to the federal background-check system. The legislation passed in the 2018 Consolidated Appropriations Act.

After the 2018 Stoneman Douglas High School shooting, Murphy made an impassioned call for action in the Senate, saying, "this happens nowhere else other than the United States of America, this epidemic of mass slaughter, this scourge of school shooting after school shooting. It only happens here not because of coincidence, not because of bad luck, but as a consequence of our inaction. We are responsible for a level of mass atrocity that happens in this country with zero parallel anywhere else. As a parent it scares me to death that this body doesn't take seriously the safety of my children, and it seems like a lot of parents in South Florida will be asking the same question today. We pray for families, for the victims. We hope for the best." In March 2018, Murphy was one of ten senators to sign a letter to Senate HELP Committee chair Lamar Alexander and ranking Democrat Patty Murray requesting they schedule a hearing on the causes and remedies of mass shootings in the wake of the shooting.

Murphy addresses the assassination of conservative activist Charlie Kirk before speaking on the Senate floor; September 10, 2025.

After the Robb Elementary School Shooting, Murphy emerged as the lead Democratic negotiator in support of the Bipartisan Safer Communities Act. The act, which would partially close the Boyfriend loophole while providing federal funding for mental health and red flag law adaptation, was viewed as the first piece of notable gun-safety legislation in decades. This bill passed with a bipartisan Senate majority and is considered highly significant gun-violence legislation.

=== Health care ===
Murphy has been a leading Senate supporter of the Affordable Care Act and has opposed Republican attempts to repeal it, consistently speaking on the floor about its favorable effects on his constituents.

In April 2017, Murphy was one of five Democratic senators to sign a letter to President Trump that warned that failure "to take immediate action to oppose the lawsuit or direct House Republicans to forgo this effort will increase instability in the insurance market, as insurers may choose not to participate in the marketplace in 2018" and that they remained concerned that his administration "has still not provided certainty to insurers and consumers that you will protect the cost-sharing subsidies provided under the law."

Murphy called the American Health Care Act of 2017 "an intellectual and moral dumpster fire" that would cause 24 million Americans to lose their health insurance.

In 2021, Murphy co-sponsored senator Jeff Merkley's Choose Medicare Act, which, according to Murphy's Senate webpage, would have allowed "every American and every American business to buy into Medicare". While commenting on Abdul El-Sayed's victory in the Democratic primary for the 2026 United States Senate election in Michigan and asked about El-Sayed's support for Medicare for All, Murphy said, "everyone in [America] should have access to the Medicare plan".

==== Mental health ====
On August 5, 2015, Murphy and Republican Senator Bill Cassidy introduced the bipartisan Mental Health Reform Act of 2015. The legislation, aimed at overhauling the mental health system, would build treatment capacity, promote integrated care models, expand the mental health workforce, and encourage the enforcement of existing mental health parity laws.

The bill was informed by listening sessions that Murphy conducted across Connecticut. The bill was widely supported by the mental health community, with organizations including the American Psychiatric Association, Mental Health America and the National Council for Behavioral Health applauding its introduction.

On March 16, 2016, the Mental Health Reform Act was unanimously passed by the Senate Health, Education, Labor, and Pensions (HELP) Committee. On December 7, 2016, the Senate passed the act as a part of the 21st Century Cures Act. The bill also provided $1 billion to address the opioid crisis and funding for the NIH Cancer Moonshot initiative. President Obama signed the bill into law on December 13, 2016.

=== LGBTQ rights ===
On September 18, 2024, Murphy opposed a Republican resolution banning trans girls from participating in girls' sports. He pointed out that Florida had banned trans girls from girls' sports when, of 800,000 high-school athletes in the state, only 13 had been known to be trans girls. He said that keeping trans kids out of sports "isn't an effort to solve a problem...I celebrate the fact that they get the experience of the camaraderie and the happiness that comes with being part of a sports team. I think that's great, and I don't think that is a threat to my kids. I don't think that's a threat to my community or my nation." He rebuked Republicans for their "obsession with transgender kids".

=== Loneliness and social connection ===
Murphy has been a vocal advocate for addressing loneliness in America, an issue he has framed as both a public health crisis and a societal challenge that requires immediate, bipartisan action. He has called loneliness a "spiritual crisis" that fuels increased addiction, violence, and suicide across demographics, regions, and partisan lines. He makes the case that genuine happiness and well-being are closely tied to social connection rather than solely economic success, emphasizing the importance of policies that encourage community and family bonds. In an op-ed co-written with Richard Weissbourd, Murphy argued that America's overemphasis on individualism has led to a cultural shift away from collective welfare, making it critical to restore a balance between individual success and the "common good".

In July 2023, Murphy introduced the National Strategy for Social Connection Act, which aims to establish a White House Office of Social Connection Policy. The office's purpose is to coordinate with federal agencies to create policies promoting social infrastructure and issue guidelines to foster social bonds. The proposed legislation also suggests funding for the CDC to research loneliness and social isolation, highlighting the health risks associated with disconnection, such as increased susceptibility to heart disease and dementia.

Murphy has sought to generate bipartisan support for his efforts to address loneliness. In April 2024, in partnership with the Republican Governor of Utah Spencer Cox, Murphy announced a series of round-table events about restoring the value of the common good. Described as "a national effort to convene discussions", these forums were intended to bring together thinkers, researchers, and writers on the left and right to explore community solutions to combat loneliness and foster social solidarity.

Murphy has also proposed targeted measures such as regulating youth access to social media, improving labor policies to allow more leisure time, and supporting institutions like trade unions and religious organizations that naturally build community. His goal is to reframe policy discussions around social well-being, and rebuild the "social fabric" weakened by modern individualism and technological isolation.

In January 2025, Murphy and Senators Ted Cruz, Katie Britt, and Brian Schatz introduced the Kids Off Social Media Act (KOSMA). Senators John Curtis, Peter Welch, John Fetterman, Ted Budd, Mark Warner, and Angus King co-sponsored the act. It would set a minimum age of 13 to use social media platforms and prevent social media companies from feeding "algorithmically targeted" content to users under 17. Murphy said, "Everyone knows how harmful social media can be to kids. As a parent, I've seen firsthand how these platforms use intentionally addictive algorithms to spoon-feed young people horrifying content glorifying everything from suicide to eating disorders. Yet these companies have proven they will choose profits over the well-being of our kids unless we force them to do otherwise. This bipartisan legislation will finally hold social media companies accountable".

=== Immigration ===
In July 2019, Murphy and 15 other Senate Democrats introduced the Protecting Sensitive Locations Act, which mandated that ICE agents obtain a supervisor's approval before engaging in enforcement actions at sensitive locations, except in special circumstances; that agents receive annual training; and that they annually report enforcement actions in those locations.

Murphy co-wrote and negotiated support for the Bipartisan Border Bill, also called the Border Act of 2024, which did not pass.

=== U.S. Supreme Court ===
After the U.S. Supreme Court overturned Roe v. Wade in June 2022, Murphy called the justices who supported the decision "politicians" and said: "The Constitution to them is just a fun tool to help them impose their political views on the entire country. The implausible inconsistency of the guns and abortion rulings is both sickening and revealing."

== Personal life ==
Murphy married Catherine Holahan in August 2007. After 17 years of marriage, they separated in November 2024 and divorced in July 2026. They have two sons together.

In September 2025, Semafor reported that Murphy was dating Tara McGowan, an American political strategist. They were no longer dating by the next month.

Raised as a Congregationalist, Murphy identifies as "unspecified/other Protestant". In 2015 he said he was "not a regular churchgoer these days, in part because of kids, in part because of a busy schedule." By 2023, Murphy joined churches in Hartford and Washington.

Every year, Murphy walks a different route through Connecticut to reacquaint himself with his constituents.

=== Health ===
On October 31, 2026, Murphy was hospitalized after suffering a stroke; he experienced numbness in his arm while at his son's hockey game and was taken to a local hospital before being transferred to Johns Hopkins Hospital for monitoring. He was discharged a week later.

== Publications ==
=== Books ===
- The Violence Inside Us: A Brief History of an Ongoing American Tragedy. New York: Random House. 2020. ISBN 9781984854575.
- Crisis of the Common Good: The Fight for Meaning and Connection in a Broken America. New York: Farrar, Straus and Giroux. 2026. ISBN 9780374621117.

=== Articles ===
- "How to Make a Progressive Foreign Policy Actually Work", The Atlantic, October 7, 2019
- "The Wreckage of Neoliberalism", The Atlantic, October 25, 2022
- "The Politics of Loneliness", The Bulwark, December 13, 2022
- "We Have Put Individualism Ahead of the Common Good for Too Long" (co-authored with Richard Weissbourd), Time, April 11, 2023
- "The Left Needs a Spiritual Renaissance. So Does America." (co-authored with Ian Marcus Corbin), The Daily Beast, May 19, 2023
- "The reason to care about the plight of men", Chris Murphy's substack, July 7, 2023
- "Algorithms Are Making Kids Desperately Unhappy", The New York Times, July 18, 2023
- "America is facing a spiritual crisis. More leisure time is the cure." (co-authored with Tim Ryan), MSNBC, December 9, 2023
- "The Spiritual Unspooling of America: A Case for a Political Realignment", The New Republic, December 12, 2023
- "How Neoliberalism Cuts Off Community", The American Prospect, June 13, 2024
- "A Good Life Starts in a Good Hometown", Roosevelt Institute, April 29, 2025

== Electoral history ==
Connecticut 81st State House District General Election, 1998
Party	Candidate	Votes	%
Democratic	Chris Murphy	4,462	55.03
Republican	Angelo Fusco (incumbent)	3,647	44.97
Total votes		8,109	100.00
Democratic gain from Republican			

Connecticut 81st State House District General Election, 2000
Party	Candidate	Votes	%
Democratic	Chris Murphy (incumbent)	7,016	68.22
Republican	Barbara Morelli	3,268	31.78
Total votes		10,284	100.00
Democratic hold			

Connecticut's 16th State Senate district General Election, 2002
Party	Candidate	Votes	%
Democratic	Chris Murphy	15,953	52.61
Republican	Ann P. Dandrow	14,370	47.39
Total votes		30,323	100.0%
Democratic gain from Republican			

Connecticut's 16th State Senate district General Election, 2004
Party	Candidate	Votes	%
Democratic	Chris Murphy (incumbent)	24,026	59.94
Republican	Christopher J. O'Brien	14,872	37.10
Independent	Frank A . Burgio, Sr.	891	2.22
Working Families	Derek John Ljongquist	294	0.73
Total votes		40,083	100%
Democratic hold			

Connecticut's 5th Congressional District election, 2006
Party	Candidate	Votes	%
Democratic	Chris Murphy	122,980	56.46
Republican	Nancy Johnson (incumbent)	94,824	43.54
Total votes		217,804	100.00
Democratic gain from Republican			

Connecticut's 5th Congressional District Election, 2008
Party	Candidate	Votes	%
Democratic	Chris Murphy (incumbent)	178,377	59.65
Republican	David Cappiello	117,585	39.32
Independent	Thomas Winn	3,066	1.03
Total votes		299,028	100.00
Democratic hold			

Connecticut's 5th Congressional District Election, 2010
Party	Candidate	Votes	%
Democratic	Chris Murphy (incumbent)	122,879	54.06
Republican	Sam Caligiuri	104,402	45.94
Total votes		227,281	100.00
Democratic hold			

2012 U.S. Senate Democratic primary results
Party	Candidate	Votes	%
Democratic	Chris Murphy	89,283	67.43%
Democratic	Susan Bysiewicz	43,135	32.57%
Total votes		132,418	100%

United States Senate election in Connecticut, 2012
Party	Candidate	Votes	%	±%
Democratic	Chris Murphy	828,761	54.82%	+15.09%
Republican	Linda McMahon	651,089	43.07%	+33.45%
Libertarian	Paul Passarelli	25,045	1.66%	N/A
Write-in		6,869	0.45%	+0.44%
Total votes		1,511,764	100%	N/A
Democratic gain from Independent				

United States Senate election in Connecticut, 2018
Party	Candidate	Votes	%	±%
Democratic	Chris Murphy (incumbent)	825,579	59.53%	+4.71%
Republican	Matthew Corey	545,717	39.35%	−3.94%
Libertarian	Richard Lion	8,838	0.64%	−1.02%
Green	Jeff Russell	6,618	0.48%	N/A
Write-in		88	0.01%	-0.44%
Total votes		1,386,840	100%	N/A
Democratic hold				

United States Senate election in Connecticut, 2024
Party	Candidate	Votes	%	±%
Democratic	Chris Murphy (incumbent)	1,000,695	58.58%	−0.95%
Republican	Matthew Corey	678,256	39.70%	+0.35%
Cheaper Gas Groceries	Robert F. Hyde	14,879	0.87%	N/A
Green	Justin Paglino	14,422	0.84%	+0.36%
Write-in		7	0.00%	-0.01%
Total votes		1,708,259	100%	N/A
Democratic hold				

U.S. House of Representatives
Preceded by Nancy Johnson	Member of the U.S. House of Representatives from Connecticut's 5th congressional district 2007–2013	Succeeded by Elizabeth Esty
Party political offices
Preceded by Ned Lamont	Democratic nominee for U.S. Senator from Connecticut (Class 1); 2012, 2018, 2024	Most recent
Preceded by Brian Schatz	Deputy Secretary of the Senate Democratic Caucus; 2025–present Served alongside: Brian Schatz	Incumbent
U.S. Senate
Preceded by Joe Lieberman	U.S. Senator (Class 1) from Connecticut; 2013–present Served alongside: Dick Blumenthal	Incumbent
Honorary titles
Preceded by Brian Schatz	Baby of the Senate; 2013–2015	Succeeded by Tom Cotton
U.S. order of precedence (ceremonial)
Preceded by Brian Schatz	Order of precedence of the United States as United States Senator	Succeeded by Elizabeth Warren
Preceded by Tammy Baldwin	Seniority in the United States Senate; 36th	Succeeded by Mazie Hirono
