= New York Focus =

Nonprofit US investigative news operation

- Founded: 2020; 6 years ago
- Type: 501(c)(3)
- Purpose: Investigative journalism
- Region served: New York State
- Editor-in-Chief: Akash Mehta
- Affiliations: Institute for Nonprofit News, States Newsroom
- Website: www.nysfocus.com

New York Focus is a nonprofit news organization that produces investigative journalism covering New York State and City politics and policy. The organization was founded in October 2020 by Akash Mehta, who acts as editor-in-chief. New York Focus initial funding came from the Open Society Foundation. Current funding sources include the Ford Foundation, the Vital Projects Funds, revenue from publishing partnerships, and donations from private individuals. Mehta stated in a 2021 interview with Spectrum News that the organization's mission is to "serve as a home for adversarial, in-depth investigative reporting on New York state politics and policy."

== Notable reporting ==
=== State government affairs ===
In 2022, New York Focus was the first to report on criminal charges filed against New York Governor Andrew Cuomo for allegedly committing the crime of forcible touching against a female aide.

=== Criminal legal system ===
In 2021, New York Focus collected data for and published a joint report with Gothamist and WNYC about the large variations in how frequently judges grant bail to people awaiting trial.

On November 3, 2021 New York Focus and the Intercept published the results of their joint investigation into physical and sexual abuse in New York state prisons, and issues with accountability therein.

On June 6, 2023, New York Focus reported on a directive from New York's Department of Corrections and Community Supervision limiting the distribution of writing and other creative work produced by incarcerated people. On June 7, 2023, the Department of Corrections rescinded the directive.
