= Rone Tempest =

Rone Tempest is a Chicago area based American author and investigative reporter. He won a 1997 Goldsmith Prize for Investigative Reporting. Working for the Los Angeles Times, he shared the 2004 Pulitzer Prize for Breaking News Reporting, for its coverage of the Old Fire, a wildfire in October 2003. He is a frequent contributor to the nonprofit Wyoming news site WyoFile that he cofounded with Christopher Findlater in 2008. In 2018 he joined the board of the non-profit Utah Investigative Journalism Project for which he contributes occasional articles to the Salt Lake Tribune. He is the author of the nonfiction books "The Last Western" and "Two Elk Saga: How Man's Dream Became State, Federal Nightmare"

== Life ==
He graduated from the University of California, Berkeley. He worked for the Oklahoma City Times, Daily Oklahoman, Oklahoma Journal, Detroit Free Press, and Dallas Times Herald. He was a reporter for the Los Angeles Times, from 1976 to 2007 where he served as bureau chief in Houston, New Delhi, Paris, Beijing, Hong Kong and Sacramento.

Tempest was visiting lecturer at the University of California, Berkeley, from 1999 to 2007 and from 2007 to 2010 consultant to ProPublica.

He lives in Flossmoor, Il.
