= The Philadelphia Public School Notebook =

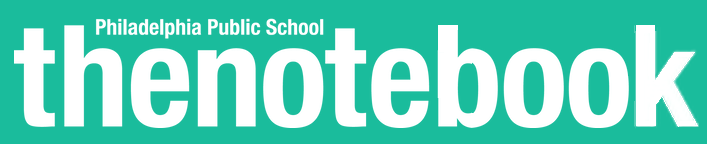
- Type: Bimonthly newspaper
- Founded: 1994; 31 years ago
- Language: English
- City: Philadelphia, Pennsylvania
- Country: United States
- Website: thenotebook.org

The Philadelphia Public School Notebook is an independent, nonprofit, free news service that serves the parents, students, teachers, school leaders, and other community members involved in Philadelphia public schools. It was created to provide a critical, progressive, and accurate source of information about the Philadelphia public school system so that community members could use that information to empower themselves as advocates for public schools.

The Notebook has two components: its print newspaper, which is published six times a year, and its news website, where it posts daily stories as well as electronic versions of its print editions.

The Notebook has been praised by The New York Times, who described its articles as "notably well written" and its former editor director, Paul Socolar, as the "journalist of the future." Philadelphia City Paper has also recognized The Notebook as "the go-to source for major education news" in Philadelphia. Herbert Kohl, a nationally acclaimed author and educator, called the Notebook "one of the leading progressive education journals in the country."

In 2020, The Notebook joined Chalkbeat to create Chalkbeat Philadelphia.

== History ==
The newspaper was founded in 1994 by a small group of parents and teachers, including former editor director, Paul Socolar, parent advocate and education activist Myrtle L. Naylor, Notebook cartoonist Eric Joselyn, parent advocate and organizer Helen Gym, and others. With grant money from the Bread and Roses Community Fund, the Notebook was able to publish its first issue in May 1994.

== Paper distribution ==
The Notebook is distributed in every district-run and charter school in the school district of Philadelphia, at all branches of the Free Library of Philadelphia, and at about 750 community sites around the city. The newspaper's expenses are covered through advertising revenue, grants, and its individual membership program.

== Website ==
The Notebook's website posts daily new stories from its investigative journalists. It also publishes stories and blog posts from its team of community bloggers and from other leaders in the Philadelphia education community.

== Awards and recognitions ==
- The Education Writers Association awarded a special citation in 2012 to Benjamin Herold, Dale Mezzacappa, Paul Socolar, and Chris Satullo (of WHYY/Newsworks) for their coverage of cheating in Pennsylvania public schools.
- Philadelphia City Paper named the Notebook one of the paper's "Big Vision" winners for 2011.
- The Education Writers Association awarded the Notebook second prize for Education Reporting in 2010.
- The Urban Education Fund awarded Paul Socolar for his leadership at the Notebook in 2005.
- The Bread and Roses Community Fund awarded the Notebook the Community Empowerment Award in 2002.
