= Global Investigative Journalism Network =

Association of nonprofit investigative journalism organizations

- Formation: 2003; 23 years ago
- Type: 501(c)(3) organization
- Tax ID no.: 47-2494303
- Legal status: Nonprofit
- Headquarters: United States
- Members: 250 (2024)
- Website: gijn.org

The Global Investigative Journalism Network (GIJN) is "an international association of nonprofit organizations that support, promote and produce investigative journalism." The association is headquartered in the United States, and its membership is open to "nonprofits, NGOs, and educational organizations" that are active in investigative reporting and data journalism. The organisation's projects include a help desk for journalists, a resource center, and training conferences.

== History ==
In 2001, veteran journalists Brant Houston, then director of Investigative Reporters and Editors, and Nils Mulvad organized a conference of 400 investigative journalists from 40 countries in what would become GIJN. GIJN was officially formed in Copenhagen as a loose network in support of the biennial Global Investigative Journalism Conference (GIJC). The GIJN secretariat was officially formed after participants of the 7th GIJC in Kyiv voted for the formation of a provisional secretariat in 2013. The organization registered as a nonprofit corporation in Maryland, United States of America, in 2014 and was approved as a 501(c)(3) nonprofit organization by the U.S. Internal Revenue Service in October 2014. Guidestar rated GIJN as 'Gold-level' for transparency of the organization's finances and leadership in 2023. In late 2023, GIJN was designated as undesirable in Russia.

== Members ==
Some of the member organizations include the Center for Investigative Reporting, Investigative Reporters and Editors (IRE), International Consortium of Investigative Journalism (ICIJ), Organized Crime and Corruption Reporting Project (OCCRP), Arab Reporters for Investigative Journalism (ARIJ), the Belarusian Investigative Center, Brazilian Association of Investigative Journalism, Investigative Journalism Programme at Wits University, Philippine Center for Investigative Journalism, ProPublica, Journalism for Nation Building Foundation-Philippines and Interlink Academy for International Dialog and Journalism. Membership is open to nonprofit journalism organizations, NGOs, educational organizations, and some for-profit organizations, while governments and individual reporters are not eligible to join.

== Global Investigative Journalism Conference (GIJC) ==
GIJN co-organizes a biennial Global Investigative Journalism Conference (GIJC), to bring together investigative journalists across the globe to share their knowledge and expertise with each other and to form cross-border networks for collaborative reporting and referrals. The GIJC has been held in Copenhagen in 2001 and 2003, Amsterdam (2005), Toronto (2007), Lillehammer (2008), Geneva (2010), Kyiv (2011), Rio de Janeiro (2013), Lillehammer (2015), Johannesburg (2017), Hamburg (2019), and Gothenburg (2023).. The latest conference was held in Kuala Lumpur, Malaysia, in 2025. In 2021, owing to the Coronavirus pandemic, the conference was held online only. Since 2014, GIJN has organized investigative journalism conferences in Asia. The first Asian Investigative Journalism Conference was held in Manila (2014), the second in Kathmandu (2016), and the third in Seoul (2018).

== Global Shining Light Award ==
GIJN gives out Global Shining Light Awards for excellence in investigative reporting "in a developing or transitioning country, done under threat, duress, or in the direst of conditions." The awards are presented to recipients in an awards ceremony held every two years at its biennial GIJC events. Past recipients include the Organized Crime and Corruption Reporting Project (OCCRP), Khadija Ismayilova from Radio Free Europe/Radio Liberty, Zulkarnain Saer Khan for his work at Secret prisoners of Dhaka and Venezuelan investigative news site Armando.info.

== See also ==
- Freedom of the press
- Public service journalism
