= Angelo Fusco (politician) =

American politician (born 1953)

Member of the Connecticut House of Representatives from the 81st district
- In office January 9, 1985 – January 6, 1999
- Preceded by: Gerald P. Crean Jr.
- Succeeded by: Chris Murphy

Personal details
- Born: April 5, 1953 (age 73) Southington, Connecticut
- Party: Republican

Angelo Fusco (born April 5, 1953) is an American politician who served in the Connecticut House of Representatives from the 81st district from 1985 to 1999.
