= Public service journalism =

Reporting done in the public interest

Public service journalism, public service media, or public service internet, is when mission-driven organizations report the news and have editorial independence from governments (unlike state media) and for-profit companies.

Public service outlets place more emphasis on public-interest reporting such as investigative journalism. In the United States, many struggling for-profit newspapers and radio stations have transformed into nonprofits in order to continue to serve their constituents with the help of new funding streams like foundation grants. The competition from misinformation, whether for profit or political reasons, as well as the dominance of platforms have created challenges for public service media while elevating their importance in providing accurate information to citizens. In order to provide good information, public service outlets need both funding support and a degree of editorial independence.

== History ==
For-profit newspapers have been declining in the United States, for example, with the rise of the internet, cable TV and other forms of information and entertainment.

In 2016, the European Broadcaster Union found that countries with popular, well-funded public-service broadcasters have less right-wing extremism, corruption and more press freedom.

As of 2020, there was little to no public service media strategy at the European level, with individual states pursuing a range of initiatives without much collaboration or thoughtful regulation to promote public media in Europe, potentially hampering democratic debate about European issues.

== Non-commercial outlets ==
=== Nonprofit business model ===
Of the members surveyed for the Institute for Nonprofit News, most revenue as of 2022 typically comes from foundation grants and other donations.

Bill Birnbauer argues that nonprofits can reduce influence from their funders with total transparency.

Tara McGowan criticizes commercial news organizations that put paywalls up for their most important content, especially before big elections. She also believes modern media creates content with too much bias, negativity, and false equivalency.

=== Industry associations ===
==== Global Investigative Journalism Network ====
The Global Investigative Journalism Network supports almost exclusively not-for-profit organizations engaged in or otherwise supporting investigative journalism around the world that maintain high journalistic standards.

==== Institute for Nonprofit News ====
The Institute for Nonprofit News serves mostly organizations in the United States but also in other countries and publications with a global reach. It describes itself as a group that "strengthens and supports more than 450 independent news organizations in a new kind of news network: nonprofit, nonpartisan and dedicated to public service."

==== Public Media Alliance ====
The Public Media Alliance (PMA) is a global network of self-described "Public service media" organizations, whose members have, historically, delivered most content through broadcasting on radio and television. The Alliance also monitors and advocates for public-service media around the world. In a 2020 overview of public service media, Sally-Ann Wilson of PMA argued that public media remained the most trusted source for news and information. The report found that 150 organizations define themselves as public media but noted that some have been captured by states, especially in the global south. It also noted the influence of China as a major media player in Africa, Asia, and increasingly the Caribbean and Europe, which, unlike western ties to public media, does not promote democracy.
