= Richard Weissbourd =

American child psychologist (born 1957)

- Born: 1957 (age 68–69)
- Occupation: Psychologist
- Years active: 1990s-

Richard Weissbourd (born 1957) is an American child and family psychologist on the faculty of Harvard's Graduate School of Education, where he operates the Human Development and Psychology Program, and Harvard Kennedy School. His research focuses on children's moral development, on vulnerability and resilience in childhood, and on effective schools and services for children. His writings on these subjects have appeared in The New York Times, Forbes, Slate The Boston Globe, and The New Republic.

Weissbourd is the author of The Parents We Mean To Be: How Well-Intentioned Adults Undermine the Moral and Emotional Development of Children (Houghton Mifflin Harcourt, 2009), and The Vulnerable Child: What Really Hurts America's Children and What We Can Do About It, (Addison-Wesley, 1996) (named by the American School Board Journal as one of the top ten education books of all time).

For six years Weissbourd worked as a psychologist in community mental health centers as well as on the Annie E. Casey Foundation’s New Futures Project, an effort to prevent children from dropping out of school. He is a founder of several interventions for at-risk students including ReadBoston and WriteBoston, city-wide literacy initiatives led by Mayor Thomas Menino. With Robert Selman, he founded ProjectASPIRE, a social and ethical development intervention. He is a founder of The Lee Academy in Boston, offering a continuous program between preschool and elementary school that serves children ages 3–11. He has advised on the city, state and federal levels on family policy and school reform. He also operates the Harvard University "Making Caring Common" Project which advocates kind manners in children.

== Biography ==
Weissbourd received his bachelor's degree from Stanford University in 1979, and his Ed.D. degree from Harvard University in 1987. Weissbourd is Jewish.

== Publications ==
=== Books ===
The Vulnerable Child: What Really Hurts America's Children and What We Can Do About It (Addison-Wesley, 1996)

The Parents We Mean To Be: How Well-Intentioned Adults Undermine Children's Moral and Emotional Development (Houghton Mifflin Harcourt, 2009)

=== Selected articles ===
"The Feel Good Trap," The New Republic, Aug. 19 & 26, 1996

"Distancing Dad," The American Prospect, December 6, 1999

"Down Home," The New Republic, February 25, 2002

"Moral Parent, Moral Child," The American Prospect, Summer 2002

"Moral Teachers, Moral Students," Education Leadership, vol. 60, no.6
