= 2018 United States Senate election in Connecticut =

- November 6, 2018
- Turnout: 63.58%
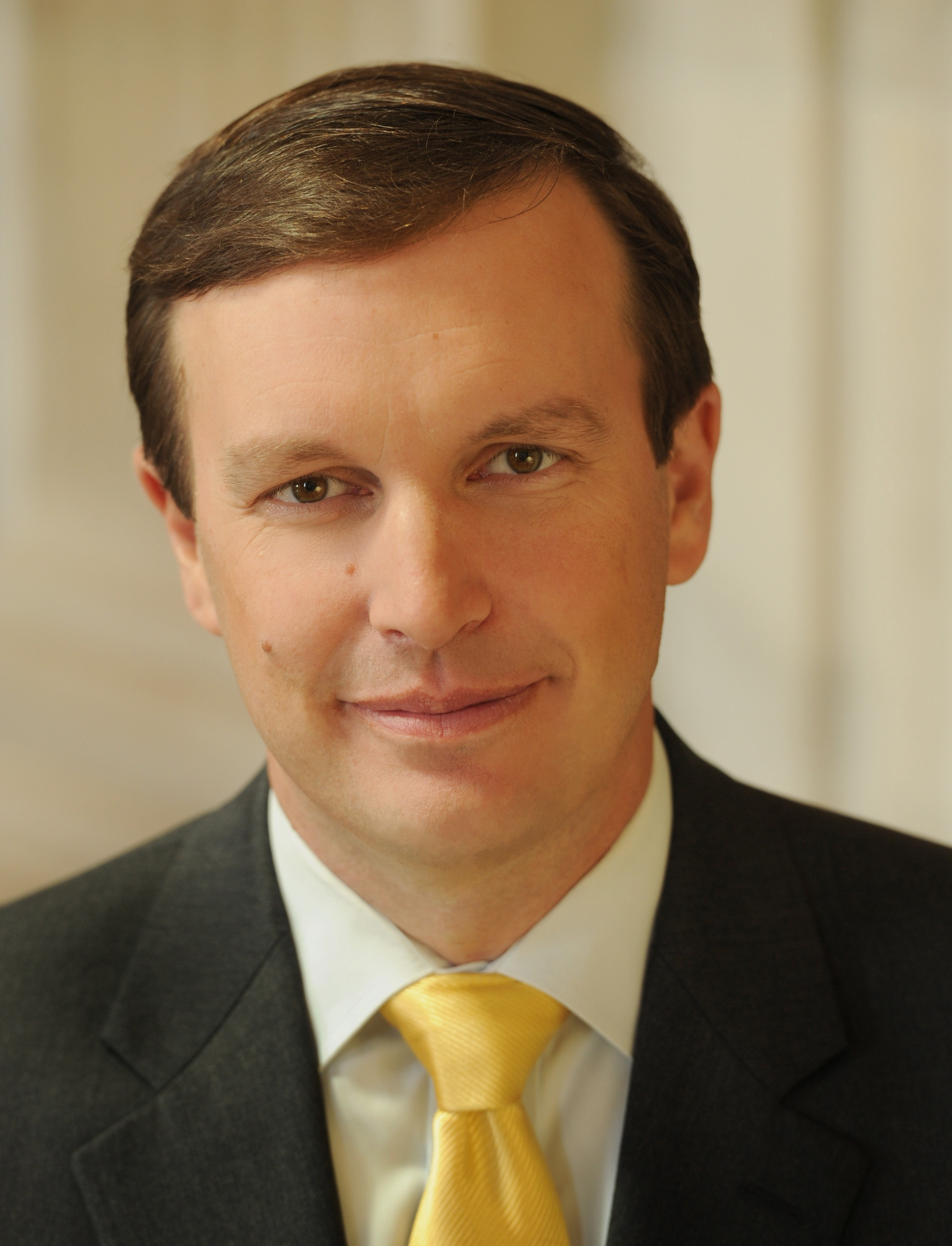

Nominee	Chris Murphy	Matthew Corey
Party	Democratic	Republican
Alliance	Working Families
Popular vote	825,579	545,717
Percentage	59.53%	39.35%
- Murphy: 40–50% 50–60% 60–70% 70–80% 80–90% >90% Corey: 40–50% 50–60% 60–70%
U.S. senator before election
Chris Murphy
Democratic
Elected U.S. Senator
Chris Murphy
Democratic

The 2018 United States Senate election in Connecticut took place on November 6, 2018, to elect a member of the United States Senate to represent the State of Connecticut. Incumbent Democrat Chris Murphy sought and won reelection to a second term.

The primary election was held on August 14, 2018, following a June 12 candidate filing deadline. In the November 6, 2018 general election, incumbent Chris Murphy defeated Republican nominee Matthew Corey with over 59% of the vote. Despite this, Corey was the first Republican since 1926 to win the town of Sprague.

== Democratic primary ==
=== Candidates ===
==== Declared ====
- Chris Murphy, incumbent U.S. senator

==== Withdrew ====
- Ann-Marie Adams, investigative journalist and founder of The Hartford Guardian

=== Endorsements ===
Chris Murphy

Organizations

- J Street
- League of Conservation Voters
- MoveOn.org
- National Committee to Preserve Social Security and Medicare
- National Organization for Women
- Natural Resources Defense Council Action Fund
- Population Connection
- Sierra Club
- United Automobile Workers

== Republican primary ==
=== Candidates ===
==== Declared ====
- Matthew Corey, businessman
- Dominic Rapini, businessman

==== Eliminated at convention ====
- Joe Visconti, former West Hartford Councilman and independent candidate for governor in 2014

==== Declined ====
- Gretchen Carlson, former Fox News anchor and former Miss America

=== Endorsements ===
Matthew Corey

Individuals

- Ann Coulter, conservative commentator

Newspapers

- Waterbury Republican-American

=== Results ===
Results by county Map legend: Corey—80–90%; Corey—70–80%; Corey—60–70%

Republican primary results
Party	Candidate	Votes	%
Republican	Matthew Corey	99,899	76.54%
Republican	Dominic Rapini	30,624	23.46%
Total votes		130,523	100.00%

== Libertarian primary ==
=== Candidates ===
- Richard Lion

== General election ==
=== Predictions ===
Source	Ranking	As of
The Cook Political Report	Safe D	October 26, 2018
Inside Elections	Safe D	November 1, 2018
Sabato's Crystal Ball	Safe D	November 5, 2018
Daily Kos	Safe D	September 17, 2018
Fox News	Likely D	September 19, 2018
CNN	Safe D	September 16, 2018
RealClearPolitics	Safe D	September 16, 2018

=== Polling ===
Poll source	Date(s) administered	Sample size	Margin of error	Chris Murphy (D)	Matthew Corey (R)	Other	Undecided
Gravis Marketing	October 30 – November 1, 2018	681	± 3.8%	58%	35%	–	7%
Emerson College	October 27–29, 2018	780	± 3.7%	55%	35%	3%	7%
Quinnipiac University	October 22–28, 2018	1,201	± 4.0%	56%	41%	0%	3%
Quinnipiac University	October 3–8, 2018	767	± 5.0%	57%	42%	0%	1%
Gravis Marketing	August 24–27, 2018	606	± 4.0%	54%	37%	−	8%
Quinnipiac University	August 16–21, 2018	1,029	± 3.9%	59%	31%	0%	8%

=== Results ===

United States Senate election in Connecticut, 2018
Party	Candidate	Votes	%	±%
Democratic	Chris Murphy	787,685	56.80%	+4.35%
Working Families	Chris Murphy	37,894	2.73%	+0.36%
Total	Chris Murphy (incumbent)	825,579	59.53%	+4.71%
Republican	Matthew Corey	545,717	39.35%	−3.94%
Libertarian	Richard Lion	8,838	0.64%	−1.02%
Green	Jeff Russell	6,618	0.48%	N/A
Write-in		88	0.00%	-0.45%
Total votes		1,386,840	100.00%	N/A
Democratic hold				

==== By county ====
County	Chris Murphy Democratic		Matthew Corey Republican		Various candidates Other parties		Total votes cast	
County	Fairfield	217,601	61.82%	131,321	37.31%	3,083	0.88%	352,005
Hartford	213,157	62.53%	123,864	36.34%	3,845	1.13%	340,866	
Litchfield	39,593	46.97%	43,621	51.75%	1,080	1.28%	84,294	
Middlesex	44,886	57.06%	32,836	41.74%	945	1.21%	78,667	
New Haven	189,456	59.45%	126,004	39.54%	3,226	0.91%	318,686	
New London	62,115	59.28%	40,993	39.12%	1,679	1.6%	104,787	
Tolland	36,713	55.86%	28,046	42.67%	970	1.47%	65,729	
Windham	22,058	52.76%	19,032	45.52%	716	1.72%	41,806	
Total	825,579	59.53%	545,717	39.35%	15,544	1.17%	1,286,840	

==== By congressional district ====
Murphy won all five congressional districts.

District	Murphy	Corey	Representative
1st	63%	36%	John B. Larson
2nd	56%	42%	Joe Courtney
3rd	61%	37%	Rosa DeLauro
4th	62%	37%	Jim Himes
5th	55%	44%	Elizabeth Esty (115th Congress)
5th	55%	44%	Jahana Hayes (116th Congress)
