= Institute for Nonprofit News =

Non-profit consortium of journalism organizations

- Formation: 2009; 17 years ago
- Type: 501(c)(3) organization
- Tax ID no.: 27-2614911
- Registration no.: C3250040
- Members: 475 (2024)
- Staff: 20–30
- Website: inn.org

The Institute for Nonprofit News (INN) is a non-profit consortium of nonprofit journalism organizations. The organization promotes non-profit investigative and public service journalism. INN facilitates collaborations between member organizations, provides training in best-practices and fundraising and provides back-office services.

== History ==
INN was founded as the Investigative News Network in 2009 at a summer conference held at the Pocantico Center in New York with journalists from the Center for Public Integrity and the Center for Investigative Reporting, among other newer organizations. The result of that conference was the Pocantico Declaration with the intent to share resources and collaborate on projects.

Two papers in 2010 described a trend in news media where watchdog journalism was being done increasingly outside of mainstream newsrooms. INN was granted 501(c)(3) nonprofit status by the IRS in March 2012, 19 months after applying. In November 2014, the board of INN met to conduct a strategic review of the organization. During that meeting the board decided to refine the organization's mission and to change its name from "Investigative News Network" to the "Institute for Nonprofit News".

In March 2015, the board voted to terminate the organization's first CEO, Kevin Davis, and appoint data reporter Denise Malan as the interim CEO while a search was conducted to find a permanent replacement. In September 2015, Sue Cross, formerly a consultant and before that a long-time employee of AP was hired as the new Executive Director and CEO. At the start of 2024, Karen Rundlet took over the top role from Cross; Rundlet had worked in the journalism program at the John S. and James L. Knight Foundation for several years and was previously a multimedia business journalist.

== Members ==
As of November 2024, INN has 475 members, up from 189 in March 2019, and 60 in 2011. In 2023, 48 per cent of newsrooms that applied to become members were accepted, with others not meeting membership standards like editorial independence, quality of journalism and transparency around who funds their work. Most outlets, as of 2023, were focused at the state and local level. A growing number of outlets also reported having volunteers play a significant role. As of February 2024, the median member had 4 staffers and $271,000 in revenue.

=== Notable national or international members ===
- Coda Media
- ICT
- Inside Climate News
- Mother Jones
- PBS News Hour
- PolitiFact
- ProPublica
- Religion News Service
- The Conversation
- The Intercept
- OpenSecrets
- Chronicle of Philanthropy
- Pulitzer Center
- The Signals Network

=== Regional or local ===
- WABE (Atlanta)
- WFAE (Charlotte)
- WHYY (Philadelphia)
- KNPR (Nevada)
- WNYC (New York)
- KQED (San Francisco Bay Area)
- CalMatters (California)
- Honolulu Civil Beat (Hawai'i)
- Mississippi Today (Mississippi)
- New York Focus (New York)
- The Connecticut Mirror (Connecticut)
- Texas Tribune (Texas)
- WyoFile (Wyoming)
- Chalkbeat

=== Rural News Network ===
As of 2024, the network reported having 80 INN-member newsrooms across 47 states. In 2021, The Associated Press reported on how INN was helping to form The Rural News Network, a collaboration that started with 60 rural nonprofit news organizations before it reported growing to 70 in 2022.

== Activities ==
As a 501(c)3 non-profit education organization, INN provides coordination, training, support services and financial sponsorship to its membership. It has published educational resources and training materials, including a whitepaper, "Audience Development and Distribution Strategies", In 2011, INN joined the Thomson Reuters media platform. Also in 2011, INN launched the INNovation fund with the Knight Foundation to support experimentalism in nonprofit journalism. In 2012, INN developed "Project Largo", a WordPress theme and CMS platform for news websites based on NPR's Project Argo that is used by member organizations in New Orleans, Connecticut, Maine, Iowa, Oklahoma and elsewhere.

In 2013, INN's CEO Kevin Davis consulted on a nonprofit media working group for the Council on Foundations to produce a report titled "The IRS and Nonprofit Media." The report urges the IRS to update its approach to granting charity status to non-profit journalism organizations. Also in 2013, INN member I-News merged with Rocky Mountain PBS and Denver-based NPR affiliate KUVO in what was a first of its kind merger between public broadcasters and INN members.

Since 2016, INN has operated NewsMatch, an initiative supported by a collective of national and regional foundations that match donations from individuals to nonprofit news organizations and that also provides fundraising training and resources to help newsrooms become more sustainable. In 2021, The New York Times highlighted how communities where local newspapers were shuttering followed INN's playbook for how to start a nonprofit news organization, which it found were becoming more prevalent. In November 2024, the Institute for Nonprofit News secured press credentials for all of its 475 member organizations in a partnership with the Reporters Committee for Freedom of the Press.

== See also ==
- Global Investigative Journalism Network
- Public broadcasting
- States Newsroom
- Association of Alternative Newsmedia
