= The Connecticut Mirror =

American online news organization

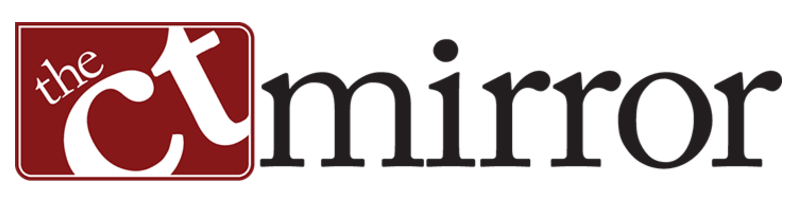
- Type: Nonprofit
- Format: Web
- Publisher: Bruce Putterman
- Editor-in-chief: Elizabeth Hamilton
- Founded: 2009
- Political alignment: Nonpartisan
- Headquarters: 1049 Asylum Avenue; Hartford, Connecticut
- Website: ctmirror.org

The Connecticut Mirror (also known as CT Mirror) is a nonprofit, non-partisan, online-only news organization covering public policy, government, and politics in Connecticut. Based in Hartford, Connecticut, CT Mirror was founded in 2009 and first published on January 25, 2010. As of January 1, 2024, CT Mirror had 21 full-time staff (17 journalists and 4 business staff).

== Content ==
CT Mirror covers a range of public policy topics including the state budget, economic development, politics, education, health, justice, housing, the environment, transportation, legislation, campaigns, and elections. CT Mirror and CT Public Media co-employ the only Washington, D.C.–based full-time reporter covering the impact of federal policy in Connecticut. CT Mirror is the only subsidiary of the nonprofit Connecticut News Project.

== Executives ==
Board leadership includes Bilal Sekou (chair), Joe McGee (vice-chair), Shelley Geballe (secretary) and Fionnuala Darby-Hudgens (treasurer).

Bruce Putterman is the publisher of CT Mirror. He is responsible for the strategic direction of the organization, revenue generation, product innovation, reader engagement, and all business operations.

Elizabeth Hamilton is the executive editor of CT Mirror. She is responsible for all of the journalism content on CT Mirror and for managing the news staff.

== Affiliations or partnerships ==
- Associated Press
- Connecticut Public Radio
- Institute for Nonprofit News
- States Newsroom
