= Institute for Investigative Journalism =

Concordia University institute

- Founded: 2018
- Founder: Patti Sonntag
- Type: Non-profit investigative journalism organization
- Purpose: Public service journalism, public education, investigative journalism, in-depth reporting and research
- Location: Montréal, Québec
- Region served: Canada
- Website: tcij.org

The Institute for Investigative Journalism (IIJ), is a Concordia University, Montréal, Québec-based institute, founded in 2018 by Patti Sonntag, that teaches, promotes and engages in investigative journalism on Canadian issues. The institute partners journalism students with reporters and editors from Canadian media outlets to work collaboratively on large-scale public service investigations. In 2019, the IIJ's "Tainted Water" project was a finalist for the Michener Award for public service projects. The collaboration included 143 journalists from Canadian journalism schools and news organizations—The Toronto Star, Le Devoir, Regina Leader-Post, Global News, National Observer, and Star Halifax/Vancouver/Calgary/Edmonton. The IIJ's project resulted in "Canada-wide commitments to replace lead pipes and test water more rigorously". The IIJ project was described as a "new way to produce great public-service journalism".

== Overview ==
The institute supports "accountability and investigative reporting" Canada-wide. Patti Sonntag, who leads the IIJ, was previously a managing editor at the news division of The New York Times. The institute works across "institutional boundaries and provincial and national borders" in collaborations that include seasoned investigative reporters and student journalists.

The institute was launched on June 14, 2018, with its headquarters in the Department of Journalism at Concordia University.

Its founding supporter is the Rossy Foundation. The Montréal-based McConnell Foundation awarded a CA$600,000 grant to the IIJ to "train more students, produce more work, and develop a sustainable business model". The grant covers 2019 to 2022.

The second collaborative project, "The Price of Oil", was a national collaboration between students from four universities, the National Observer, the Toronto Star, and Global News — funded by the Michener Awards Foundation, the Corporate Mapping Project, the University of Regina and Patti Sonntag — "investigating the impacts of the oil and gas industry on Canadian communities". They published their first report in the October 1, 2017, in the Toronto Star, Global News, and the National Observer on October 1, 2017, and by March 2018, the "Price of Oil" project had "produced more than 70 publications and broadcasts". It received an honourable mention for national journalism from the 8th Canadian Hillman Prize.

The journalism schools at Carleton University, Humber College, Mount Royal University, Ryerson University, University of King's College, the University of Regina, and the University of British Columbia participated in the IIJ's founding project in 2018 and 2019.

In 2019, the IIJ's "Tainted Water" project was a finalist for the Michener Award. The "Tainted Water" project was a collaborative effort that included 143 journalists from journalism schools across the country and the Toronto Star, Le Devoir, Regina Leader-Post, Global News, National Observer, and Star Halifax/Vancouver/Calgary/Edmonton. Following the publication of the tainted water series, commitments were made to "replace lead pipes and test water more rigorously". The Michener Foundation said the IIJ's project was a "new way to produce great public-service journalism". The project included more than 800 FOI requests.

In 2020, the "Tainted Water" collaboration won a Canadian Association of Journalists (CAJ) award, with certificates going to all participants from the nine universities and ten media organizations that had collaborated. FOIs had gathered the results of municipal tests on 79,000 samples in older homes nationwide and the compiled data revealed that one-third had "exceeded the national safety guideline of five parts per billion".

== See also ==
- Centre for Investigative Journalism, London, England
- Wisconsin Center for Investigative Journalism, nonprofit organization housed at the University of Wisconsin–Madison
- International Consortium of Investigative Journalists
- The Center for Investigative Reporting
