= States Newsroom =

American nonprofit journalism network

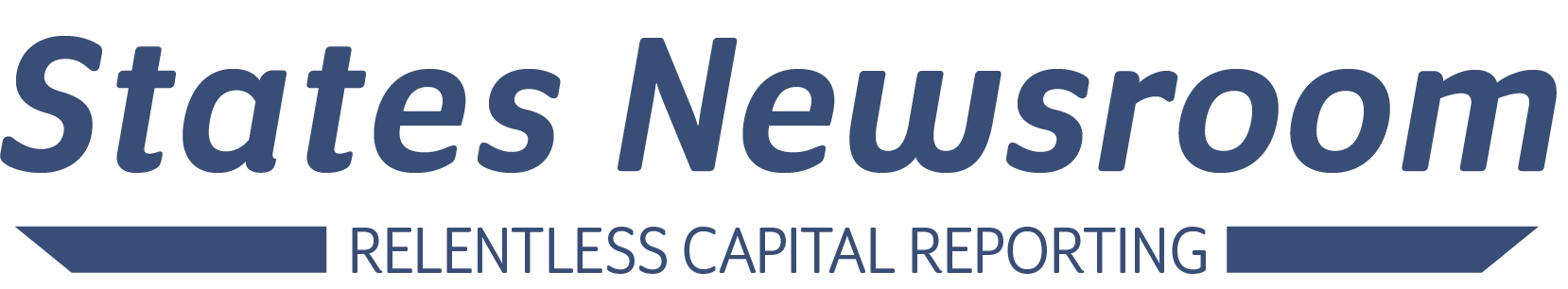
- Formation: 2019
- Type: 501(c)(3)
- Tax ID no.: 84-2113822
- President: Chris Fitzsimon
- Subsidiaries: 39
- Affiliations: 11
- Budget: $27.5 million (2024)
- Staff: 220 (2024)
- Website: statesnewsroom.com

States Newsroom is a nonprofit news network in the United States. It has news organizations in 39 U.S. states and newsrooms in all 50 state capitals through partnerships, focusing primarily on state politics. States Newsroom grew out of NC Policy Watch, a progressive think tank founded in 2004 by Chris Fitzsimon, who is its current president. In 2017, the project expanded, using the liberal group the Hopewell Fund as an incubator. In 2019, States Newsroom became an independent 501(c)(3) nonprofit.

== Organization ==
States Newsroom provides funding, human resources, and digital support to journalists in the state newsrooms. It typically has four to six journalists per newsroom and allows its articles to be republished for free under a Creative Commons license. States Newsroom accepts no corporate donations and has publicly shared the names of all donors contributing $1,000 or more since becoming a 501(c)(3) in 2019. The progressive Wyss Foundation gave $1 million to States Newsroom in 2020.

States Newsroom's commentary and opinion pieces are clearly-labeled and generally lean left. The organization does not allow opinion pieces from candidates or political officeholders. Many, but not all, of the organization's larger donors also lean left. States Newsroom did not disclose its donors until 2020, when it started disclosing the names of all donors giving more than $1,000 since becoming a 501(c)(3) in 2019. In August 2020, Inside Philanthropy reported that Google was one of the funders of States Newsroom. The largest single contributors donated $21.2 million and $9.9 million in 2022 and 2023, respectively.

In 2023, the Pew Charitable Trusts transferred its Stateline news service, which provides nonpartisan reporting on trends in state policy, to States Newsroom with $3 million to help with the transition. In 2024, States Newsroom reported having 220 full-time employees, with an annual budget of more than $22 million. It grew from five affiliates upon its 2019 launch to 39 freestanding newsrooms at 11 partner outlets covering all 50 states by early 2024.

== Reception ==
Given its history of "dark money" funding and left-leaning editorial boards, some have questioned the partisanship of States Newsroom's journalism. In January 2020, Steven Brill of NewsGuard asked States Newsroom to reveal their donors—which the organization did later that year. But in 2021, after accepting a $1 million donation from the progressive Wyss Foundation, NewsGuard said their journalism was "bought by people with a political agenda". A June 2024 NewsGuard study continued to categorize State Newsroom as a partisan outlet designed to look apolitical. That same month, Axios called States Newsroom "one of the more strategic" of the "politically motivated websites masquerading as independent local news outlets."

In 2020, the Nieman Foundation for Journalism listed but then retracted adding the newsrooms as "hyperpartisan" in a map. At a press conference in November of that year, Missouri Governor Mike Parson refused to take a question from a Missouri Independent reporter, saying "I am not going to respond to a c4 out of Virginia that is absolutely a propaganda news agency." According to PolitiFact, the Missouri Independent is a legitimate news organization, a 501(c)(3), and "not a website peddling hoaxes."

In 2023, Nieman noted the experience of the journalists and in 2024 called NewsGuard's depiction of States Newsroom "misguided." In April 2024, Cameron Joseph wrote in the Columbia Journalism Review that the outlets "are nothing like the 'pink slime' organizations that pass off partisan propaganda as local news. Many of the journalists running the local newsrooms... had previously been at major state newspapers" and that reporters and editors were largely autonomous from the national operation.

== Newsrooms ==
In July 2019, States Newsroom had 13 outlets, nine of which were in swing states. As of 2024, States Newsroom had newsrooms in 39 states under its umbrella and the nationwide Stateline newsroom. In the other 11 states, States Newsroom syndicates content from independent nonprofit newsrooms such as CalMatters, CT Mirror, Honolulu Civil Beat, Mississippi Today, New York Focus, and the Texas Tribune. In 2021, Iowa Capital Dispatch was the first to report a lawsuit against a local Tyson pork-processing plant for work conditions during COVID-19.

=== List of newsrooms ===
The 39 state newsrooms under the States Newsroom umbrella include:

- Arizona Mirror
- Alabama Reflector
- Alaska Beacon
- Arkansas Advocate
- Capital News Illinois
- Colorado Newsline
- Commonwealth Beacon
- Daily Montanan
- Florida Phoenix
- Georgia Recorder
- Idaho Capital Sun
- Indiana Capital Chronicle
- Iowa Capital Dispatch
- Kansas Reflector
- Kentucky Lantern
- Louisiana Illuminator
- Maine Morning Star
- Maryland Matters
- Michigan Advance
- Minnesota Reformer
- Missouri Independent
- NC Newsline
- Nebraska Examiner
- Nevada Current
- New Hampshire Bulletin
- New Jersey Monitor
- North Dakota Monitor
- Ohio Capital Journal
- Oklahoma Voice
- Oregon Capital Chronicle
- Pennsylvania Capital-Star
- Rhode Island Current
- Source New Mexico
- South Carolina Daily Gazette
- South Dakota Searchlight
- Spotlight Delaware
- Tennessee Lookout
- Utah News Dispatch
- Virginia Mercury
- Washington State Standard
- West Virginia Watch
- Wisconsin Examiner

== See also ==
- Chalkbeat, another group of nonprofit newsrooms that publish under a Creative Commons license
- Courier Newsroom
- Institute for Nonprofit News, a consortium of U.S. nonprofit journalism organizations, including many of the nonprofits that partner with States Newsroom
