= Wisconsin Center for Investigative Journalism =

- Established: January 2009
- Focus: Investigative and public interest journalism
- Director: Andy Hall
- Location: Madison, Wisconsin
- Website: wisconsinwatch.org

Wisconsin Watch or the Wisconsin Center for Investigative Journalism is a nonprofit investigative news organization housed at the University of Wisconsin–Madison. The organization's mission is to "increase the quality and quantity of investigative reporting in Wisconsin, while training current and future generations of investigative journalists."

In 2013, Wisconsin Governor Scott Walker vetoed a provision of the state's biennial budget that would have prohibited collaboration between the University of Wisconsin-Madison School of Journalism and Mass Communication and the Center. Under the terms of the proposed provision, the Center would have faced eviction from the University of Wisconsin's campus, where it has its offices. Republicans in the Wisconsin State Senate had sent the bill to the governor's desk by voting to remove the Center from the University's campus due to questions over the Center's funding sources and a concern that the Center's work was biased against conservatives.

Journalist Bill Lueders worked at the center for four years, writing about the intersection of money and politics, before becoming associate editor of The Progressive in 2015.

In 2024, Wisconsin Watch merged with Milwaukee Neighborhood News Service.

== Affiliations ==
The Center is a founding member of the Institute for Nonprofit News (formerly known as Investigative News Network), a group of nonprofit journalism organizations.

The Center also is a signatory to the International Fact Checking Network and its code of principles, a fact-checking consortium.

== Awards ==
In 2017, The Center won a Sigma Delta Chi Award from the Society for Professional Journalists.

== See also ==
- Centre for Investigative Journalism, London, England
- Institute for Investigative Journalism, at Concordia University, Montreal, Quebec, Canada
- Center for Investigative Reporting (CIR), nonprofit news organization based in Emeryville, California
