= Nonprofit journalism =

Journalism funded by philanthropy

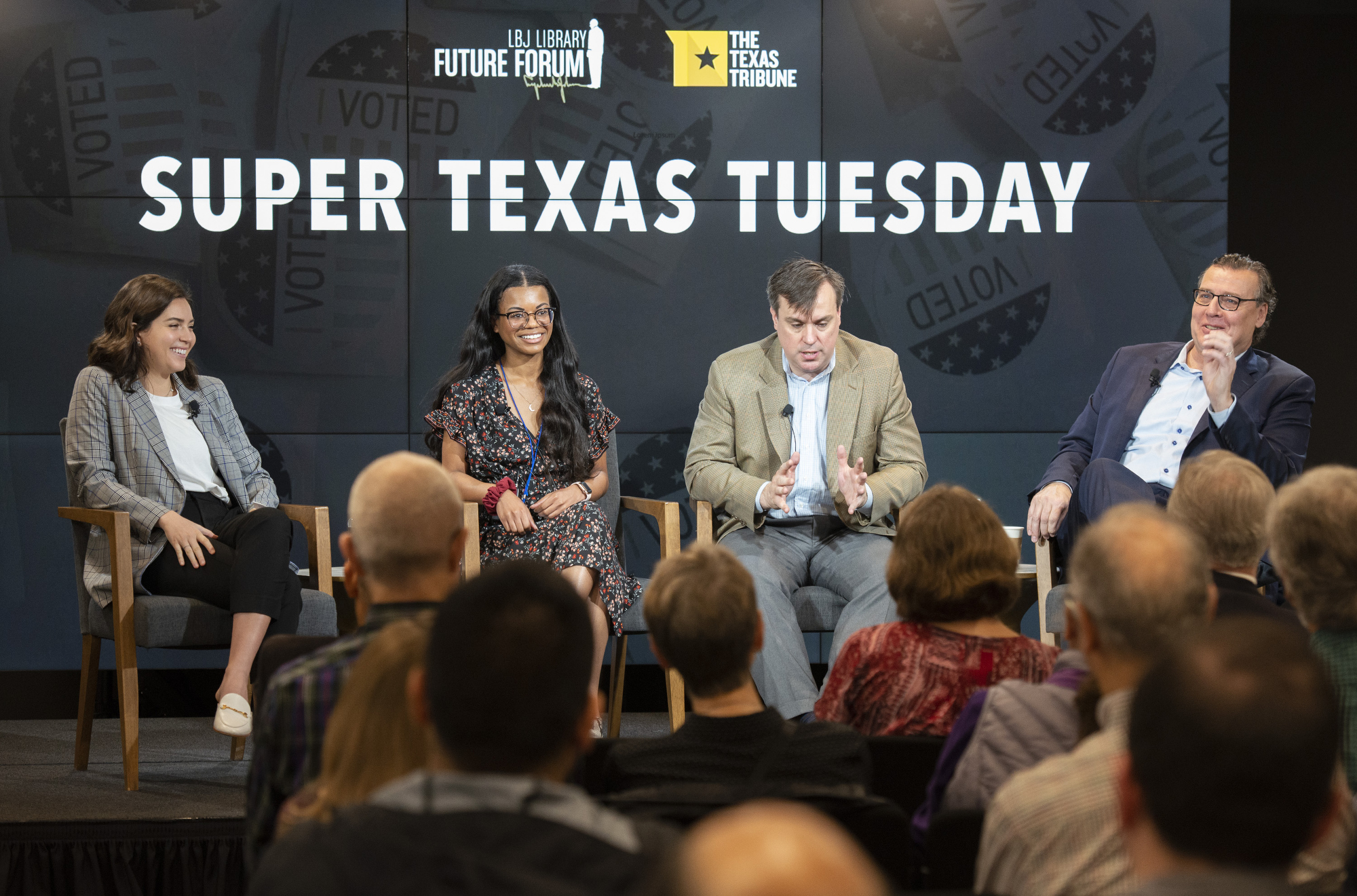
A panel of reporters discuss politics at a 2020 event hosted by the nonprofit news organization The Texas Tribune

Nonprofit journalism or philanthrojournalism is the practice of journalism funded largely by donations and foundations. The growth in this sector has been helped by funders seeing a need for public interest journalism like investigative reporting amidst the decline in revenue for for-profit journalism. Transparency and diversified funding streams have been put forward as best-practices for these types of organizations. Journalism done at a nonprofit organization should be evaluated just as critically as journalism from for-profit or other outlets. Some research suggests that the presence of robust nonprofit newsrooms in a community improves democracy through increased accountability for elected officials.

== Terminology ==
The term philanthrojournalism has appeared in British sources and emphasizes the role of foundations. Public service media is a related term that has referred to organizations that receive government funding, starting with radio in the 1920s, and projects like Wikipedia.

American nonprofit journalism organizations have also been described under the banner of nonprofit news. Foundation-funded journalism and think tank journalism are less common terms.

== History ==
Although nonprofit journalism dates back to at least the start of the Associated Press in 1846, the first group dedicated to investigative journalism was the Center for Investigative Reporting (CIR), which formed in 1977. Moreover, journalist Charles Lewis founded the Center for Public Integrity in 1989. Since then, many other nonprofits have proliferated firstly in the United States, and then, elsewhere in the world. Due to their alternative funding models, many of these organizations have contributed deeply to investigative journalism. For example, ProPublica won Pulitzer Prizes within a few years of its founding.

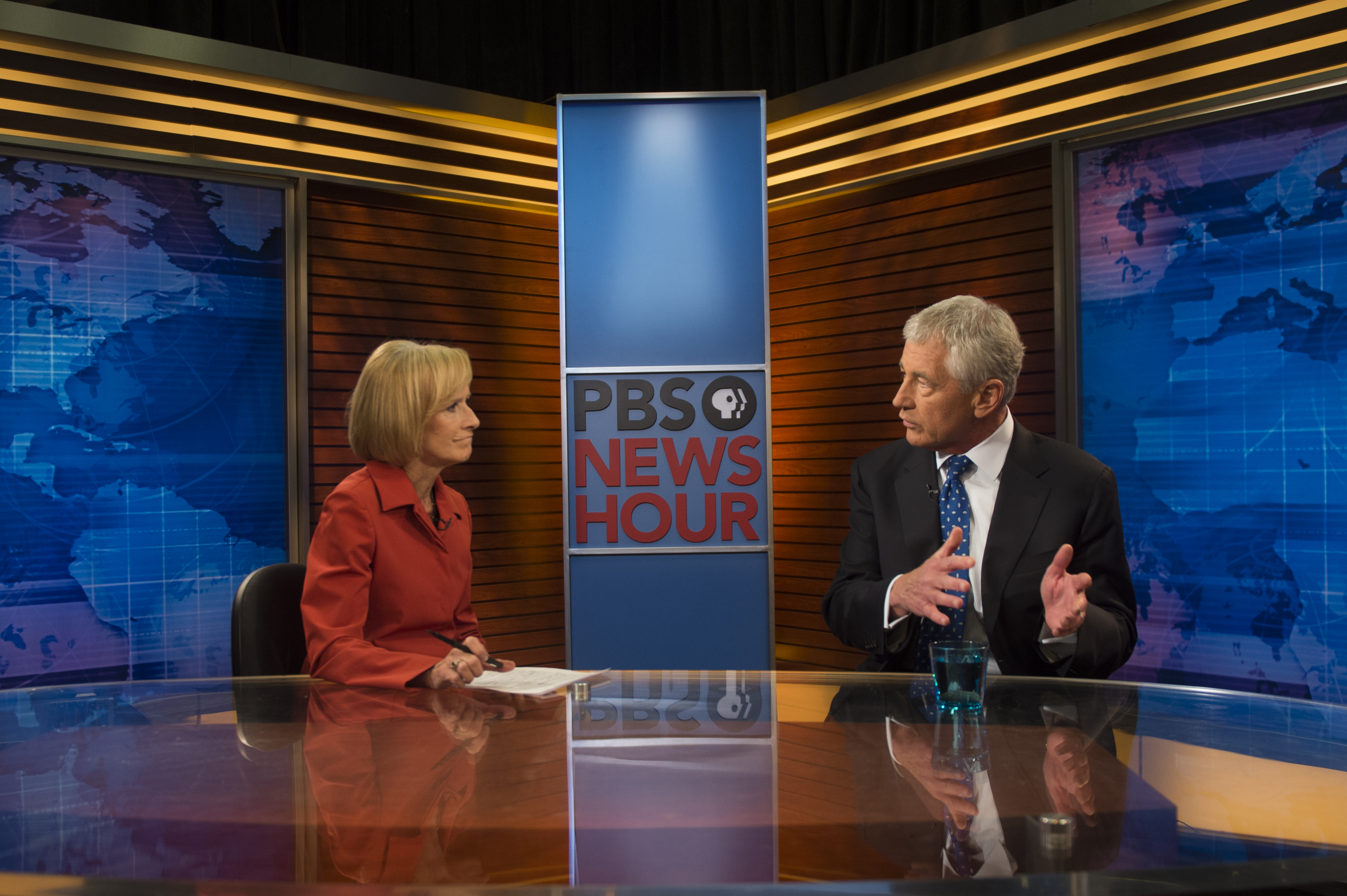
Judy Woodruff interviews then-Secretary of Defense Chuck Hagel on the PBS NewsHour public television show

The number of nonprofit investigative reporting centers has grown from only three in the late 1980s to dozens in the 2020s, with centers originating in countries such as Romania, the Philippines, Jordan, and South Africa. Four global conferences on investigative journalism since 2000 have attracted some 2,000 journalists from more than 50 countries. There have been many initiatives to increase transparency and accountability in funding to improve editorial independence. For example, the Institute for Nonprofit News (INN), formed in 2009, is a network of hundreds of nonprofit news organizations that must meet their journalistic standards.

The proliferation of investigative journalism centers ranges from state-oriented initiatives to local grassroots-based initiatives. The state or region-based model often benefits from sustainability based on reliable funding from foundations in the same area. State-oriented centers such as the Wisconsin Center for Investigative Journalism and New England Center for Investigative Reporting have garnered success and been suggested as viable alternatives to the nationwide news outlets. Likewise, there are an increasing number of local-level investigative centers, in places such as Baltimore and Texas, making their narrow-focus even more relatable to local readers.

== Funding ==
The distinct business model of philanthrojournalism distinguishes it from other types of journalism. As mainstream media has struggled in terms of revenue, nonprofit journalists have turned increasingly to the nonprofit model. Studies in 2023 and 2024 found that around half of funding for nonprofit journalism in the United States comes from foundations. Investigative journalism in particular has been described as being a difficult proposition for for-profit organizations, but can thrive when supported by foundations and donors.

Many organizations, such as ProPublica, are publishing the salary of their journalists as well as the center sources of revenue on their websites. Many centers, such as the Voice of San Diego, are also utilizing hybrid models of philanthropy and private sector revenue combinations. The Bay Citizen, for example, bases its funds on four sources of revenue. Sustainability and overreliance on foundations can become a concern for organizations especially when they exit the startup phase when some foundations might want to pull back funding to focus on other new ventures.

== Impact on content ==
Mike Caulfield and Sam Wineburg in their 2023 book about online media literacy, caution that nonprofit status (and .org domains) should not be used as evidence that the information presented is reliable. Harry Browne finds that the removal of direct commercial pressures could allow reporters more time to work on a story, by freeing them to pursue less-popular topics and by reducing the likelihood of pressure from an owner or advertiser. Browne also notes that if philanthrojournalism seeks to remain transparent by constantly informing the public about its ultimate source of subsidy and the work of its donors, and if it also seeks to do so in a democratic manner, philanthrojournalism could achieve more editorial independence. ProPublica, as well as many other nonprofit centers have published details of their funding revenues, the salaries of their reporters and the ideological perspectives of their donors. The Institute for Nonprofit News, a member-driven industry network, requires full members to meet journalistic standards and to provide public transparency into their funding to improve editorial independence.

Between May 2010 and September 2011, the Pew Research Center's Journalism Project studied 46 national-level nonprofit investigative organizations created after 2005, examining their transparency, political bias, number of revenue streams and productivity. The study showed that, within that time period, the news organizations which have multiple funding sources and are transparent about funding have a more balanced ideological perspective. Out of the organizations studied, 56% were labelled as ideologically skewed. Likewise, the most ideologically skewed organizations tended to be funded mostly or entirely by one parent organization. More often than not the topics covered on these sites correlated with the political orientation of their donors. For example, while the liberal-oriented American Independent News Network sites favored discussions of organized labor and the environment, the more conservative Watchdog.org, meanwhile, focused on government policies and their inefficiency and waste. Examples of sites with the most balanced coverage included ProPublica and The Texas Tribune, which were also among the most visited in the sample. David Westphal in 2009 expressed support for foundation-funded journalism, but worried that many of the news organizations report based on their funder's interest areas. Moreover, Robert Arnove and Nadine Pinede (2007) undertook a study on the "big three" US-based foundations – Ford, Rockefeller and Carnegie – and revealed that they play the role of unofficial planning agencies, have a very US-centric model, and utilize a very "elitist, technocratic approach to social change." Likewise, Sean Stannard-Stockton, claims that in addition to maintaining the status quo, many foundations use "hard power" to "shape events by providing or withdrawing grants" thereby creating a dependence by nonprofit organizations. Bob Feldman (2007) added that the processes used to gain such funding are modeled in "safe, legalistic, bureaucratic activities and mild reformism" and creates a "climate of secrecy" as the foundations domesticate their agendas.

Local democracy benefits from the added accountability brought by nonprofit newsrooms, according to research by scholars Nikki Usher and Sanghoon Kim-Leffingwell. Public corruption prosecutions have also been more common in places with thriving local nonprofit newsrooms.

== Relationship with for-profit media ==
=== Collaboration ===
Many organizations cooperate with for-profit media and even subsidize investigations to use their broad networks for their news stories. Most print and broadcast commercial outlets have expressed openness to collaborating with nonprofit partners, especially around investigative journalism. In some cases, the centers had formal arrangements with revenue exchanged, whilst in other cases, collaboration was on a story-by-story basis and did not include revenue, but only a sharing of resources and expenses. ProPublica won a 2010 Pulitzer Prize in collaboration with The New York Times for an investigative report on one hospital's emergency response to treating flood victims of Hurricane Katrina. The Center for Investigative Reporting also produces print and broadcast reports under contractual agreements with public and commercial media outlets. Many mainstream media outlets have found themselves in need for such collaborations due to their financial struggles. Smaller for-profit outlets have been able to use reporting provided free through a creative commons license by States Newsroom to supplement their local reporting without having to pay for subscriptions to the Associated Press. ProPublica's Richard Tofel argues that investigative reporting will never become obsolete, as it increasingly competes with declining mainstream media that focuses on daily politics.

=== Competition ===
Philanthrojournalism has provided an alternative business model to for-profit journalism. By mostly being digital natives with less reliance on ads, nonprofit outlets have grown a significant niche.

In 2009, mainstream media faced a revenue decline of up to 25 to 30 percent. Commercial media has faced a huge financial collapse and has therefore been forced to lay off many reporters and the reduce the size or completely shut down its foreign bureaus. Nonprofit news outlets often hire experienced journalists who have left their mainstream media careers. A PEW research study in 2010 reveals that while demand for substantive news is high, the commercial press has not been fulfilling its social responsibility role, especially in terms of investigative journalism. For example, in Los Angeles news outlets, only 1.9% of a 30-minute newscast was devoted to civic affairs, and 3.3% of Los Angeles Times news reporting was devoted to local government news. Moreover, readers are increasingly choosing internet-based news as a source of information over print news. Nonprofits, unlike mainstream media, have tended to be greater pioneers of civic journalism, as they focus most of their news on civic affairs.

Major nonprofit news outlets, such as the Center for Public Integrity, ProPublica and the Center for Investigative Reporting, have won Pulitzer Prizes, which has boosted their fundraising efforts in turn. The nonprofit funding model generally results in a greater freedom to choose stories based on merit and public impact rather than popularity, though some outlets still achieve high readership.

Many nonprofit centers receive their revenue through a total or partial combination of the following strategies: membership donations, corporate sponsorships or advertising, charging other media for content, providing services such as analyzing and posting date, training students and journalists and creating an endowment. Moreover, unlike mainstream media, which more often than not, continues to utilize print versions, most nonprofit news outlets are digital-born. They can, therefore, focus all their resources on hiring technicians or reporters with greater expertise in digital media. Many are utilizing social media, which, consequently, is increasingly bringing them closer to younger generations.

Rebecca Nee (2011) argues that philanthrojournalism could become an alternative to mainstream media. Nee emphasizes the decreasing role of mainstream news media, as she cites the 2010 State of the News Media report, which claimed that circulation had dropped by one quarter since the 21st century. Nee also adds that the digital revolution has fuelled an increasing number of readers to opt for online newspaper, allowing many digitally-native nonprofit investigative outlets to thrive in their area of digital expertise. Nonprofit news outlets are slightly in the lead over mainstream media in terms of digital innovation, as they can focus on their resources on doing so. Moreover, Nee argues that the narrow investigative scope of nonprofit news outlets allows them to not waste their resources on a daily journalism agenda.

== See also ==
- Citizen journalism
- History of journalism
- Journalism genres
