= Outcast (person) =

Someone who is rejected or cast out, as from home or society

An outcast (also known as a pariah) is someone who is rejected or cast out, as from home or from society or in some way excluded, looked down upon, or ignored. In common English speech, an outcast may be anyone who does not fit in with normal society, which can contribute to a sense of isolation.

Compare the concept of sending to Coventry.

== History ==
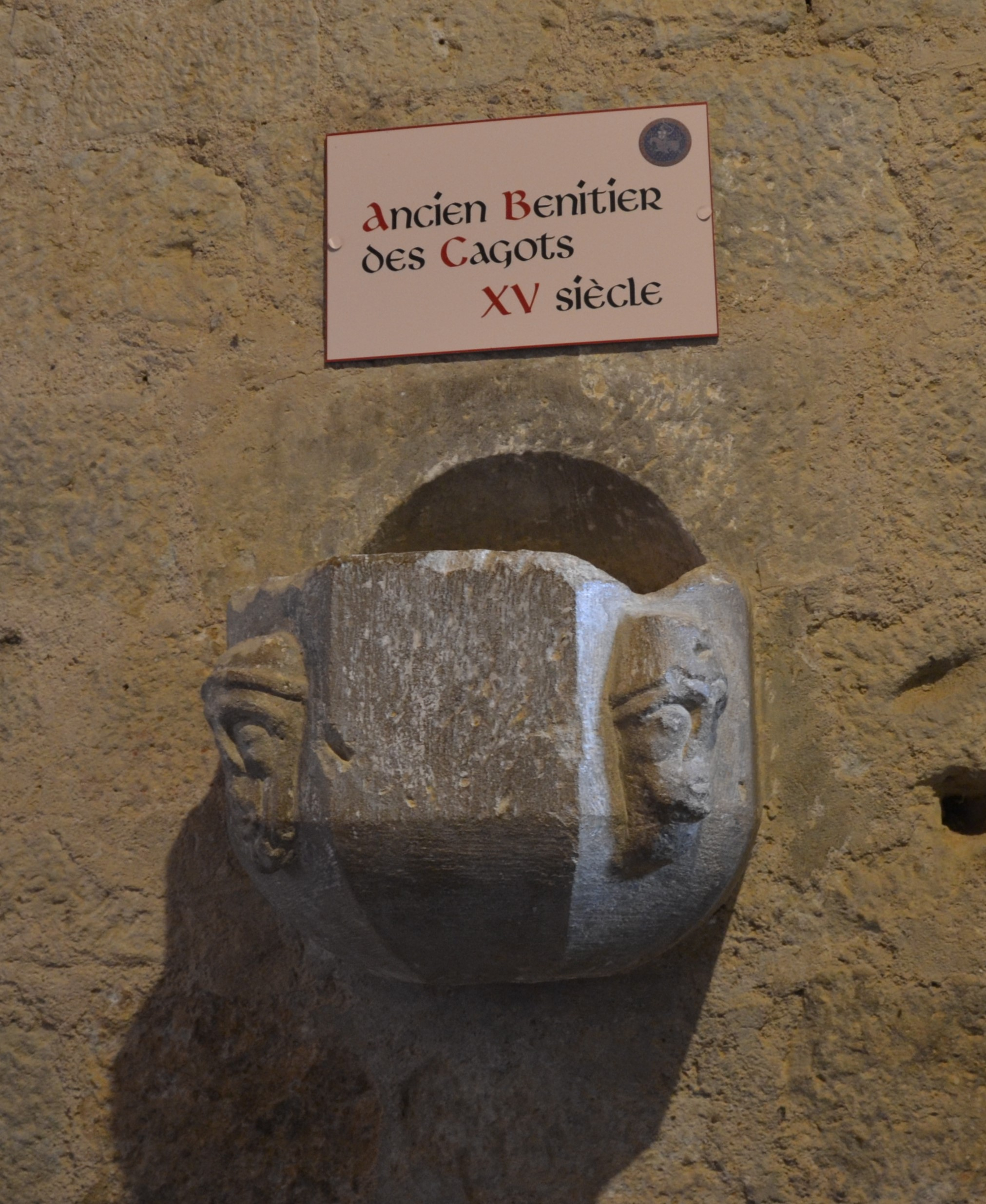
Font for Cagots in the church of Bassoues, dating from the 15th century

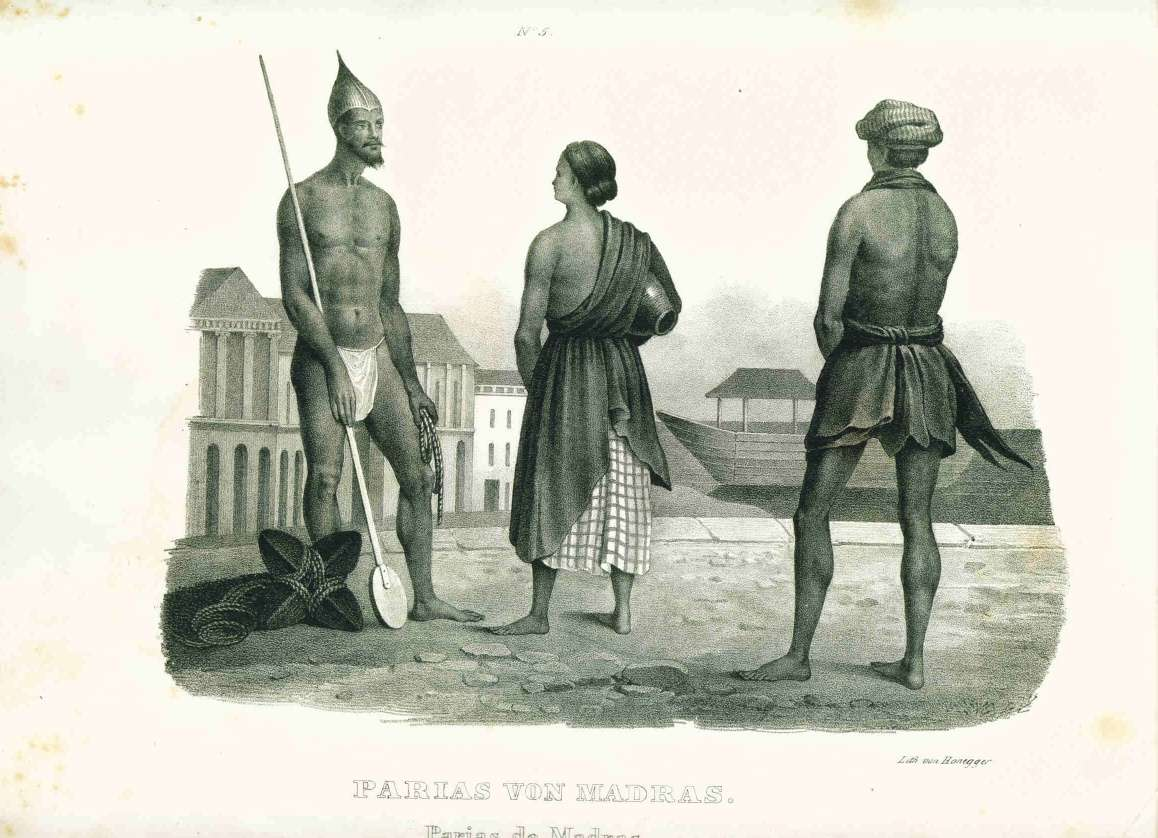
Pariahs of Madras, a German engraving, 1870s

In Ancient Greece, the Athenians had a procedure known as ostracism in which all citizens could write a person's name on a shard of broken pottery (called ostraka) and place it in a large container in a public place. If an individual's name was written a sufficient number of times, he or she was ostracized—banished from the city for ten years.

In early modern German society, executioners and their families were considered "dishonourable people" (unehrliche Leute). In France, executioners and their families were ostracized and lived in social isolation.

== India ==
Outcasts, in the caste system in India, are individuals or a group that for some reason were rejected by any other caste. It is contrary to caste system, where even pariahs have their own caste. Furthermore, foreigners not ruled by the Indian nobility in India and all foreigners were sometimes perceived as outcastes and untouchables.

== Exiles ==
To be exiled is to be away from one's home (i.e., city, state or country), while either being explicitly refused permission to return or being threatened with imprisonment or death on return. It can be a form of punishment. Exile can also be a self-imposed departure from one's homeland. Self-exile can be a protest by the person who claims it, or done to avoid persecution or legal matters (tax, criminal allegations, or otherwise), through shame, repentance, or to isolate oneself in order to devote time to a particular thing. Article 9 of the Universal Declaration of Human Rights states that, "No one shall be subjected to arbitrary arrest, detention or exile."

== In the Bible ==
In the Old Testament, Ishmael, the son of Abraham, was cast out after the birth of Isaac, his half-brother, who is considered the forebear of the Israelites. Genesis 16:12 of the Bible prophesies Ishmael's life as an outcast: "And he will be a wild man; his hand will be against every man, and every man's hand against him; and he shall dwell in the presence of all his brethren."

== See also ==
- Anthropology
- Begging
- Bitlaha (applied in South Asia)
- Burakumin
- Cagot
- Castaway
- Dalit also called outcaste
- Deviancy
- Friendship recession
- Goblin mode
- Hikikomori
- Hobo
- Leatherman
- Loneliness epidemic
- Marooning
- Nomad
- Ostracism
- Outlaw
- Persona non grata
- Pariah state
- Social rejection
- Social stigma
- Squatting
- Untouchability
- Vagrancy
