= List of The Daily Show episodes (2026) =

Release
- Original network: Comedy Central
- Original release: January 5, 2026 – present

Season chronology
- ← Previous; 2025 episodes Next →

This is a list of episodes for The Daily Show, a late-night talk and satirical news television program airing on Comedy Central, during 2026 (the series' 31st season). Jon Stewart serves as host one night each week (primarily on Mondays), while other members of the show's correspondents roster ("The Best F#@king News Team") rotate occupying the anchor chair the rest of the week.

== January ==
No. overall	No. in season	Date	Hosted by	Guest	Promotion
4134	1	January 5	Jon Stewart	U.S. Senator Mark Kelly of Arizona	n/a
Jon analyzes U.S. forces' capture of Venezuelan president Nicolas Maduro, and how Donald Trump & his administration went from "America First" to "going full conquistador" in claiming Venezuela's resources and threatening the likes of Colombia and Cuba; Senator and former Navy combat pilot Mark Kelly defends his recent message that service members can refuse illegal orders (the reason the Secretary of Defense is censuring him), and discusses Trump's "major ego problem" and the need for Democrats to win Congress and put the president in check; "Your Moment of Zen" (Senator Lindsey Graham's wish that "2026 will be the year that we make Iran great again").
4135	2	January 6	Ronny Chieng	Director Park Chan-wook	No Other Choice
"America's Noble War for Freedom in Venezuela Presented by ExxonMobil" (Nicolas Maduro and his wife appear in court, while Stephen Miller and MAGA try to justify their capture); the rush to buy the same Nike fleece jacket Maduro wore during his apprehension inspires an ad for "Strongmen's Wearhouse" ("We've got the looks from all the countries Donald Trump is threatening to invade"); the worry over microplastic pollution inspires a second ad, for "Vitamin Plastic Water" (vitamin-infused plastic bottles dumpt into the-lake-to-fish-to-human food chain); with Ronny not needing Ken Jeong for an interpreter (the guest brought his own), Director Park Chan-wook discusses developing an American novel into a Korean film, satirizing capitalism, and how movie theaters' struggles also threatens filmmaking; "Your Moment of Zen" (Trump on how his wife thinks his dancing is "not presidential").
4136	3	January 7	Ronny Chieng	Stephen J. Dubner	Freakonomics: Twentieth Anniversary Edition; Freakonomics Radio
"America's Noble War for Freedom in Venezuela Presented by ExxonMobil" (Donald Trump demands Venezuela's oil while becoming its new leader and eyeing other territories to conquer, namely Greenland); Michael Kosta applauds Trump's mafia-like nation extortions; Jordan Klepper profiles Benny Johnson's rise from plagiarizing journalist to White House press pool member in "News to Meet You"; Stephen J. Dubner discusses how he and co-author Steven Levitt combined judgement-free storytelling and data in Freakonomics, and offers some economic insights for 2026.
4137	4	January 8	Ronny Chieng	Lucy Liu	Rosemead
Ronny dissects reactions to ICE's killing of a Minneapolis woman, in particular the Trump administration's narrative that the victim was the agitator; he also questions how ICE's aggressive recruiting push led to unqualified agents "acting less like law enforcement and more like a lawless militia"; an ad offers enticements (e.g. PlayStation boxes, YouTube Premium accounts) to recruits who don't join ICE; Michael Kosta and his dog, Walter, visit a pet psychic in Maine; after another actor named Liu makes a surprise entrance, Lucy Liu comes out to discuss the years-long challenge to make Rosemead and the film's intense familial themes.
4138	5	January 12	Jon Stewart	Jenin Younes	American-Arab Anti-Discrimination Committee; Previously Prohibited podcast
Jon asks "What the f**k is happening in this country?" after a busy week of Donald Trump coveting Greenland, threatening Iran, siccing the DOJ on The Federal Reserve chair, and divvying up oil from Venezuela (of which he was listed its "acting president" on Wikipedia); Jon also laments the right's insistence that Renée Good was radical and the January 6 rioters peaceful, as well as Trump's declaration that his morality is the only check on his power; ADC National Legal Director Jenin Younes offers her analysis on ICE's actions in Minneapolis and other blue cities & states, how claims of said locales' "non-compliance" is exaggerated, and the intersection of anti-immigrant rhetoric with working class frustrations; "Your Moment of Zen" (Newsmax's Rob Finnerty mocks CNN's accented pronunciation of Nicolas Maduro's name).
4139	6	January 13	Jordan Klepper	Joachim Trier	Sentimental Value
Allegedly bad things on "The Worst Wing": Perfidy by Pete Hegseth, explicit images by Elon Musk's Grok, and an inappropriate relationship by the Secretary of Labor; Jordan and Troy Iwata break down how (and why) RFK Jr. turned the Food Pyramid upside down; "In My Opinion" (Charlamagne Tha God worries this MLK Day may be the last); Joachim Trier on building trust among a film's cast, encouraging them to take risks, and swapping antagonists for tender characters.
4140	7	January 14	Jordan Klepper	Langhorne Slim	The Dreamin' Kind
"Headlines" (Donald Trump supports Iran's protestors and gives a Detroit factory worker the middle finger, an attitude Minneapolis protestors display toward ICE and right-wing media); "America's Fashiest Home Videos" makes comedy out of ICE pratfalls; Langhorne Slim on the resonance of his older music in current times, the importance of creativity, and collaborating with Greta Van Fleet on The Dreamin' Kind (from which he also performs "Rock & Roll"); "Your Moment of Zen" (Trump's claim that milk helps him ace cognitive tests).
4141	8	January 15	Jordan Klepper	Wagner Moura	The Secret Agent
"Headlines" (Donald Trump hypes up whole milk while Europe comes to Greenland's defense); "I☭NY" (Jordan summarizes what "nightmares" Mayor Zohran Mamdani has thrust upon New York after two weeks, while residents tell Josh Johnson that free public restrooms and expanded childcare are alright); Grace Kuhlenschmidt highlights CES show gadgets in "Tech Yeah!"; Wagner Moura on how making a film set during a military dictatorship in his native Brazil helped process perplexity over a more recent autocratic reign.
4142	9	January 20	Josh Johnson	Artis Stevens	Big Brothers Big Sisters of America
"Donald Trump Engages in Respectful International Diplomacy" (Trump gets a "certified, pre-owned" Nobel Peace Prize from its actual recipient while coveting something much bigger—Greenland); Michael Kosta demonstrates how kicking one's own butt is a winning diplomatic strategy, countering Josh's doubts about Trump's tariff threats being effective diplomacy; "Jordan Klepper Fingers the Pulse" (Norwegians look askance at Trump's Nobel campaigning); BBBS president/CEO Artis Stevens on the community-changing importance of mentorship and social infrastructure.
4143	10	January 21	Josh Johnson	Simu Liu	The Copenhagen Test; Oh, Mary!
"Headlines" finds Donald Trump doing "prop comedy" in listing his accomplishments, then hyping a "concept of a deal" concerning Greenland (or Iceland?) at Davos; Josh applauds European leaders for telling Trump "no" on Greenland, while Jordan Klepper is ready to join US forces invading whatever "Land" they're asked to invade; "Everything Is Stupid" (Ronny Chieng on former New York City mayor Eric Adams' cryptocurrency venture); Simu Liu on his experience as a stock photo model and backup stunt performer, and the similarities & differences between film and stage acting.
4144	11	January 22	Josh Johnson	Alexandria Stapleton	Sean Combs: The Reckoning
Surveying the first year of Donald Trump's second term, Josh finds that the only person benefiting from Trump's promises of wealth, jobs, healthcare, and free speech is Trump himself; "Back in Black" (Lewis Black on Gen Z taking up retro bad habits); Alexandria Stapleton on ensuring The Reckoning didn't indict all of hip-hop culture for Sean Combs' crimes, how the documentary's interviewees have become less trepidatious, and how Combs might reinvent himself yet again.
4145	12	January 26	Jon Stewart	Jason Rezaian	Washington Post Press Freedom Desk
Jordan Klepper offers a DHS-friendly photo of the lead-up to Alex Pretti's killing that shows kittens as stand-ins for ICE agents and a Marvel villain for Pretti; Jon calls out justifications by conservatives and the Trump administration that Pretti was a gun-toting threat (despite "grainy Zapruder footage" showing only a camera in his hands); Washington Post director of Freedom Initiatives Jason Rezaian recalls how humor got him through his imprisonment in Iran, and discusses that country's ongoing protests and how any deal with the U.S. will only beholden Iran's oppressive regime.
4146	13	January 27	Desi Lydic	Michael Urie	Shrinking
Desi and Troy Iwata "respectfully" offer new style looks for Greg Bovino after his ICE-out from Minneapolis; "Headlines" also covers conservatives' post-Pretti push-back against DHS, and Marco Rubio's admission that he hides from Donald Trump on Air Force One; "Sports War" (Ronny Chieng & Michael Kosta on the "Fraiser Bowl," the NHL's Heated Rivalry-fuled resurgence, and ski jumpers' "Nordick shame"); Michael Urie recalls how Vanessa Williams granted him acting agency on the Ugly Betty pilot, and discusses working with Harrison Ford & "baby actors" on Shrinking.
4147	14	January 28	Desi Lydic	Governor Mikie Sherrill of New Jersey	n/a
"Headlines" (Trump administration figures blame each other in the Alex Pretti fallout, while Ilhan Omar hits back after vinegar and Donald Trump's insults hit her); an ad for "The Trump Account Challenge" promises $1000 "if you can live long enough to turn 18 in Trump's America"; "In My Opinion" (Whitney Cummings on Democrats lining up for 2028); Mikie Sherrill on how Congressional gridlock motivated her to run for governor, preparing New Jerseyans for the ICE threat, and seeking Trump's ear regarding Gateway Program funding.
4148	15	January 29	Desi Lydic	Katherine LaNasa	The Pitt
"Samuel L. Schumer" goes blue in demanding DHS changes; Desi reviews the promo push surrounding the Melania Trump documentary, while Ronny Chieng & Michael Kosta review the film's bribes; Grace Kuhlenschmidt meets a Wisconsin man who's built an immunity to snake venom; Katherine LaNasa on how both The Pitt and her cancer treatment helped her build compassion towards healthcare workers.

== February ==
No. overall	No. in season	Date	Hosted by	Guest	Promotion
4149	16	February 2	Jon Stewart	Heather Ann Thompson	Fear and Fury: Bernie Goetz, the Reagan 80s, and the Rebirth of White Rage
Jon acknowledges his name was in the latest Epstein files release (in that "somebody like Jon Stewart" was suggested to narrate a Woody Allen biography), before noting how, thanks to DOJ inaction on the files, "the real sanctuary city" is one "where money & power" protects the rich & famous from the consequences of their bad behavior; Heather Ann Thompson recalls a white man's unprovoked shooting of four Black youths on a New York subway, and how the racial & economic divides that preceded it, and the reactions after it, still linger today; "Your Moment of Zen" (Donald Trump compliments the "professionally made" signs carried by "insurrectionists and agitators").
4150	17	February 3	Michael Kosta	Paul Rosolie	Junglekeeper: What It Takes to Change the World
"Headlines" (conservatives promote a Super Bowl halftime alternative, while Donald Trump promotes "nationalizing" elections and his never-ending claim about "winning" in 2020); Troy Iwata on the belief that Trump's only joking about cancelling the midterms; "Jordan Klepper Fingers the Pulse" of Melania premiere attendees at the Kennedy Center; Paul Rosolie on the Amazon rainforest's importance to the global ecosystem, and how deforestation in the region pushed a tribe of uncontacted peoples out of seclusion.
4151	18	February 4	Michael Kosta	Ms. Pat	The Ms. Pat Show
Michael examines Donald Trump's latest "fun merch drop" and verbal broadside toward a journalist (Kaitlan Collins); Grace Kuhlenschmidt says Trump's D.C. building spree is his way of marking his territory around the city; "The Daily Showography" offers a "for your consideration"-style profile of Gavin Newsom; Ms. Pat on learning to believe in herself and fighting to incorporate current events into her self-titled sitcom.
4152	19	February 5	Michael Kosta	Marcus Capone; Jon Shenk	In Waves and War
Donald Trump brags about the military's "Discombobulator" weapon, while public figures not named Trump face the impact of their names in the Epstein files; "The Art of the Altercation" (Desi Lydic on Trump's long-held beef with the NFL); former Navy SEAL Marcus Capone discusses the use of psychoactive drugs to treat PTSD, efforts Jon Shenk documents through animation in In Waves and War.
4153	20	February 9	Jon Stewart	Governor Andy Beshear of Kentucky	Andy Beshear Podcast on SiriusXM
Jon examines why MAGA sees as divisive Bad Bunny (for singing in Spanish) and an American Olympian (for having "mixed emotions" representing the U.S.) while their figurehead doles out his share of animosity (and racist memes) toward Americans; Andy Beshear on being a Democratic governor in a Republican-leaning state, the consequences of Donald Trump's presidency on Kentuckians, and the need for fellow Dems to communicate the "why" of their policies to constituents.
4154	21	February 10	Jordan Klepper	Tim Blake Nelson	Superhero
"The Very Normal and Not Shady Handling of the Epstein Files" names names: Donald Trump (who Jamie Raskin says appears "millions of times" in unredacted files), Howard Lutnick (who admits taking his family to Jeffrey Epstein's island) and King Charles (who's called out over his disgraced brother); Ronny Chieng calls out dinosaur fossils for their links to Epstein (since a paleontologist's own connections were revealed); "Sports War" (Jordan and Desi Lydic on Bad Bunny's Super Bowl show, an Olympic skater's Minion costume, and another Olympian's unique way of criticizing ICE); Tim Blake Nelson on writing a novel about a superhero film production and America's relationship with the superhero narrative; "Your Moment of Zen" (a Newsmax interviewer misidentifies Senator Pete Ricketts of Nebraska as "Eric Schmitt of Missouri").
4155	22	February 11	Jordan Klepper	Andrew Jarecki	The Alabama Solution
"Headlines" (a bronze-winning Olympian admits to infidelity, while Pam Bondi goes off the rails before Congress); "The Troll of the Gordie Howe Bridge" offers riddles as to why Donald Trump wants to block its opening (the answers all being "bribe"); "So Not Our Problem" (Troy Iwata on China's birth & death issues, a French fry-covered English coastline, and German cockroach conscription); Andrew Jarecki on inmates' use of contraband phones to document inhumane treatment in Alabama prisons.
4156	23	February 12	Jordan Klepper	Mayor Jacob Frey of Minneapolis	n/a
Jordan and Michael Kosta on Donald Trump backing up his latest fake award win, for "Undisputed Champion of Beautiful Clean Coal," with actual pro-coal/anti-regulation actions; Grace Kuhlenschmidt on the impact of American digital nomads living in Mexico City; Jacob Frey on the announced end of Operation Metro Surge ("I will believe it when I see it"), the strength of Minneapolis residents against ICE, and meeting New York's mayor to discuss protecting American cities from unconstitutional actions.
4157	24	February 23	Jon Stewart	A. Mechele Dickerson	University of Texas School of Law; The Middle-Class New Deal: Restoring Upward Mobility and the American Dream
Jon and Desi Lydic on the right's geopolitical celebration of Team USA's Olympic hockey victory over Canada, as well as FBI director and "Make-a-Wish man" Kash Patel's post-game party with the team; Jon also analyzes the Supreme Court's strike-down of Donald Trump's tariff strategy and a possible U.S. war with Iran; Mechele Dickerson on how government created and abandoned the American middle class, and what can be done to preserve the middle-class' American dream.
4158	25	February 24	Desi Lydic	Padma Lakshmi	America's Culinary Cup
While DJ Jordan Klepper frequently interrupts with march music (since the FCC chair wants patriotic content on the airwaves), Desi covers JD Vance's crescent roll recipe, Kristi Noem's "taxpayer-funded f**k plane," and RFK Jr.'s workout with Kid Rock in "The Worst Wing"; Michael Kosta probes research that seeks to make sex in space possible; Padma Lakshmi roasts Vance's cooking skills, and discusses returning to the reality competition genre and how the Trump administration's immigration policies affect the culinary industry.
4159	26	February 25	Desi Lydic	Jonathan Haidt; Catherine Price	The Amazing Generation: Your Guide to Fun and Freedom in a Screen-Filled World
Desi recaps the gory descriptives, award giving, and standing ovations (by just the Republicans) that made up Donald Trump's State of the Union address; Troy Iwata is disappointed he didn't get an award while attending the speech; Jordan Klepper analyzes LindellTV in "News to Meet You"; Jonathan Haidt (of NYU's Stern School of Business) and Catherine Price (founder of Screen/Life Balance) discuss teaching kids how to live a life that prioritizes friendship & fun ahead of technology.
4160	27	February 26	Desi Lydic	Christa Miller	Shrinking
"The Very Normal and Not Shady Handling of the Epstein Files" (Bill Gates and Hillary & Bill Clinton deal with their Epstein connections, while Donald Trump's DOJ buries an explosive allegation against the president); Michael Kosta on a snowball fight that conservative media turned into a riot against the NYPD; "Tech Yeah!" (Grace Kuhlenschmidt on the Pitt/Cruise AI fight, fart-tracking underwear, science-backed dance moves, and Waymo's human solution to open car doors); Desi recalls earning her SAG card on Scrubs to Christa Miller, who discusses leaning into vulnerability as an actor in Shrinking, working with husband Bill Lawrence, and how working in New York nightclubs prepared her for music supervision; "Your Moment of Zen" (JD Vance on not making a stupid face at the State of the Union).

== March ==
No. overall	No. in season	Date	Hosted by	Guest	Promotion
4161	28	March 2	Jon Stewart	Jafar Panahi	It Was Just an Accident
Jon blasts the U.S./Israeli attack on Iran, and how Donald Trump & his allies went "from 'peace through strength' to 'peace through war,'" in "Mess O'Potamia: America's Next Top Muddle"; Jordan Klepper edits Trump speeches to make it look like the president wanted "new wars" all along; Jafar Panahi (through interpreter Sheida Dayani) discusses not following audiences' tastes, capturing the humanity of his films' characters, and why he plans to return to Iran despite being censored and prosecuted there ("It's just my country").
4162	29	March 3	Michael Kosta	Geeta Gandbhir	The Perfect Neighbor; The Devil Is Busy
"Mess O'Potamia: America's Next Top Muddle" (conservatives debate calling this war a "war," while Donald Trump stocks up, friendly fire takes down a U.S. fighter jet, and Americans are told to take the bus out of the Middle East); "In My Opinion" (Leslie Jones calls out the causes of male loneliness); Geeta Gandbhir on documenting the effects of gun violence & "stand your ground" laws in The Perfect Neighbor, capturing the coexistence of faith & reproductive rights in The Devil is Busy, and holding up a mirror to society through filmmaking; "Your Moment of Zen" (Trump says "Nobody's going to tell us not to use [their air bases]" after Spain denied the U.S. the use of theirs).
4163	30	March 4	Michael Kosta	Erika Alexander	The Fall and Rise of Reggie Dinkins
"Mess O'Potamia: America's Next Top Muddle" ("Mark" & "Wayne" Mullin disagree over calling this war a "war," while Michael equates Pete Hegseth and his "no mercy" attitude toward Iran to "cheesy" movie villains); Grace Kuhlenschmidt suggests Donald Trump could be Iran's next supreme leader ("It's kind of an upgrade"); "In Too Deep" (Josh Johnson breaks down the N-word controversy at the BAFTAs); Erika Alexander on returning to TV acting and creating Hollywood opportunities for herself & marginalized talents after Living Single.
4164	31	March 5	Michael Kosta	Mychal Threets	I'm So Happy You're Here: A Celebration of Library Joy; Reading Rainbow
Kristi Noem is out of "The Worst Wing," while RFK Jr. has a beef against sugary drinks and Pete Hegseth the same against Scouting America's "woke" culture; Jordan Klepper dons his old Boy Scout uniform to add the "3-times married" badge and other new Hegseth-inspired badges; Grace Kuhlenschmidt on whether 15-minute cities are walkable utopias or government repression; Mychal Threets on how libraries foster inclusiveness and benefited his own mental health.
4165	32	March 16	Jon Stewart	San Jose Mayor Matt Mahan	2026 campaign for Governor of California
"Mess O'Potamia: America's Next Top Muddle" finds Jon connecting Iran's Strait of Hormuz closure to rising gas prices and recession, and recapping criticisms of news media's war coverage by the Defense secretary and FCC chairman; Jon then gathers "a panel of experts" — "President Trump," "Donald J. Trump," "DJT," and "John Barron" (as well as caller "'Donnie' from Palm Beach") — to offer "lucid and clear cut" thoughts on the war (only for them to offer conflicting opinions); Matt Mahan discusses his background in public school teaching and tech startups, using data to create pragmatic solutions, and building constituents' trust.
4166	33	March 17	Jordan Klepper	George Saunders	Vigil
"Mess O'Potamia: America's Next Top Muddle" (Donald Trump eyes Cuba while claiming "a former president" approves of his war with Iran, even though a now-former counterterrorism official disapproves); MAGA's internal debate over the war devolves into one over penis size; Troy Iwata doubts rumors that Iran's new supreme leader is gay; Trump Administration threats toward the media inspires an ad for "Free Speech Plus," where one can say (almost) anything they want about the president for $50/month ($40/month with ads); George Saunders discusses showing empathy for Vigil's main character (a dying tycoon forced to rationalize his brutal decisions) and finding light in a world of cruelty & chaos; "Your Moment of Zen" (local news anchors try saying "Top o' the morning to you!").
4167	34	March 18	Jordan Klepper	Steve Zahn	She Dances
"Mess O'Potamia: America's Next Top Muddle" (conservatives tell Americans to suck it up and pay high gas prices); Rand Paul brings up an old beef against fellow Senator Markwayne Mullin at Mullin's DHS confirmation hearing; Grace Kuhlenschmidt challenges both senators (and Jordan) to a duel; "Sports War" (Jordan and Desi Lydic on the WBC championship, AI-completed March Madness brackets, and the NBA scuttling a strip club tribute); Steve Zahn on co-writing, producing, and acting (alongside his daughter) in She Dances, and how he and Ethan Hawke have evolved from "iconic slacker characters".
4168	35	March 19	Jordan Klepper	Rebecca Traister	New York; Angry Girls Will Get Us Through
"Headlines" (Donald Trump jokes about the Pearl Harbor attack, while Afroman wins "hip-hop's weirdest beef"); "Ko$ta Doin' Business" (Michael Kosta on Pokémon cards, a Topo Chico shortage, and trash-talking fast-food CEOs); Rebecca Traister on channeling anger in positive ways, and the under-recognized roles of Claudette Colvin and other women, girls, and nonbinary people throughout history.
4169	36	March 23	Jon Stewart	Former U.S. National Security Advisor Jake Sullivan	Harvard Kennedy School; The Long Game podcast
Jon doubts Donald Trump's claim he's been talking to a "top person" in Iran, especially after Trump's weekend of golfing, partying, and touring Graceland; Jon also criticizes the assignment of ICE agents to TSA airport assistance; Jake Sullivan recalls actually speaking with Iranian officials on nuclear capability issues, and offers his insights on Trump's approach to Iran in particular and foreign relations in general; Jon and Josh Johnson's exchange of Chuck Schumer impressions leads into Schumer's own critique on Trump's ICE/TSA plan in "Your Moment of Zen."
4170	37	March 24	Josh Johnson	Sterling K. Brown	Paradise
Josh gives ICE "The Most Improved Agency Award" for "just standing around" and not assisting TSA workers at airport check-ins ("But it's keeping them off the streets"); an ad for "ICE PreCheck" promises "service so good, it's practically un-American"; "Ronny Chieng's Eye on AI" (a former OpenAI researcher warns that AI could make humanity extinct); Josh gives a mini-roast of Sterling K. Brown, who discusses why he became an actor, motivating fellow artists, and who he'd invite to his Paradise-style bunker.
4171	38	March 25	Josh Johnson	The Kid Mero	Mornings with Mero (WQHT Radio)
"Mess O'Potamia: America's Next Top Muddle" (as Al Roker forecasts "haboobs" in the Middle East, Donald Trump says the war is already won while Iran says otherwise); U.S. Army plans to loosen enlistment requirements inspires a recruitment ad that admits "we need a f**k-ton of troops"; Desi Lydic examines politicians' cringeworthy attempts at connecting with Gen Z; The Kid Mero on going from Hot 97 listener to Hot 97 host, advocating for un-housed youth with Covenant House, and tying Timberlands the New York way.
4172	39	March 26	Josh Johnson	Eiza González	Mike & Nick & Nick & Alice
"The Worst Wing" (Donald Trump is surprised that the new DHS secretary is a Native American, while Dr. Oz hypes up walking and RFK Jr. takes the knife to a dead raccoon's penis); Grace Kuhlenschmidt on Melania Trump bringing a humanoid robot into the White House; "So Not Our Problem" (Troy Iwata on girl-dad Kim Jong Un, Danish politicians getting steamy, a Hittler/Zielinski mayoral race in France, and an ant-trafficking scheme in Kenya); Eiza González on child-star success in Mexico, and representing Mexican culture as a working actor in the U.S.
4173	40	March 30	Jon Stewart	Cindy Cohn	Electronic Frontier Foundation; Privacy's Defender: My Thirty-Year Fight Against Digital Surveillance
To highlight the global shortage of products held up in the closed Strait of Hormuz, Ronny Chieng gobbles down pistachios, Michael Kosta sucks helium, and Jordan Klepper (reluctantly) eats fertilizer; Jon examines the weekend's contrast of nationwide No Kings rallies and CPAC's "Yasss King" rally, then criticizes Donald Trump's tendency to talk up anything other than the Iran war; executive director Cindy Cohn on EFF's fight against government surveillance of the internet, and her reservations about internet regulations.
4174	41	March 31	Desi Lydic	Julio Torres	Color Theories
"Headlines" covers Donald Trump flailing over oil, Pete Hegseth waxing poetic, Lindsey Graham at Disney World, and Kristi Noem's husband having his own kinks; "Sports War" (Ronny Chieng and Michael Kosta on March Madness buzzer-beaters, ABS, and ballpark cuisine); Julio Torres on why everyone has a little bit of synesthesia.

== April ==
No. overall	No. in season	Date	Hosted by	Guest	Promotion
4175	42	April 1	Desi Lydic	Dr. Mary Claire Haver	The New Perimenopause
Desi covers Donald Trump's day at the Supreme Court and his plans for a presidential "hotel-brary"; a judge ordering a stop to Trump's White House Ballroom project inspires an ad for the law firm of "Ball & Ball Law" ("You have the right to demolish anything you want and put a ballroom in its place"); Lewis Black rages over prediction markets in "Black in Black"; Dr. Mary Claire Haver on the lack of awareness and training for perimenopause, and helping women advocate for their own health.
4176	43	April 13	Jon Stewart	Aziz Abu Sarah; Maoz Inon	The Future Is Peace: A Shared Journey Across the Holy Land; InterAct International
Jon critiques Donald Trump's Easter beef with Pope Leo, JD Vance's failure to reach a deal with Iran, and the meme of a Christ-like Trump healing a bedridden figure who Jon thinks resembles himself ("Am I okay?"); Jon also expresses hope that Viktor Orbán's defeat in Hungary is a sign that far-right populism will also subside in the U.S.; InterAct International co-CEOs Aziz Abu Sarah and Moaz Inon discuss choosing reconciliation over revenge and empathy over conflict; "Your Moment of Zen" (a "Doordash Grandma" demurs from endorsing Trump's anti-trans athletes stance).
4177	44	April 14	Ronny Chieng	Bao Nguyen	BTS: The Return
"The Worst Wing" (Donald Trump & JD Vance defend the former's messianic meme, while RFK, Jr. starts a podcast); an ad for Waffle House offers their "official position" on the FEMA Response & Recovery head's claim that he teleported there ("We don't care, we're Waffle House"); "In My Opinion" (Nick Offerman criticizes Trump's self-aggrandizing Semiquincentennial plans); Bao Nguyen on documenting BTS' reuniting after South Korean military service; "Your Moment of Zen" (Dr. Oz recounts Trump's diet soda defense).
4178	45	April 15	Ronny Chieng	Zoe Lister-Jones	The Miniature Wife
Joe Biden mistakes a Black guy for Barack Obama in "Headlines," while Donald Trump thinks diet soda is healthy and JD Vance pleads with Gen Z to stick with MAGA; Pope Leo's anti-war stance inspires Grace Kuhlenschmidt to become "war pope"; "The People Behind the People" spotlights "Marco Glennwald III," the "naming expert" hired to name things for Trump; Zoe Lister-Jones on examining relationship dynamics in The Miniature Wife (in which Ronny co-stars), learning feminist filmmaking from her mother, and seeing her Roku series get new life on Peacock.
4179	46	April 16	Ronny Chieng	Lee Sung Jin	Beef
"Mess O'Potamia: America's Next Top Muddle" covers the Hormuz closure's impact, the rising US stock market, and Pete Hegseth calling news media "unpatriotic"; Michael Kosta contributes to America's "meme war" with Iran; "Tech Yeah!" (Grace Kuhlenschmidt on "tech neck," marathon-running robots, and an AI clone of Mark Zuckerberg); Lee Sun Jin on Beef Season 2's exploration of generational divides, and getting a surprise on-set visit from Bong Joon-ho while filming in Korea; "Your Moment of Zen" (Rep. Troy Nehls calls Trump "better than sliced bread" and "almost a second coming").
4180	47	April 20	Jon Stewart	UN General Assembly President Annalena Baerbock	n/a
After giving Donald Trump a compliment (for ordering a review of medicinal psychedelics) and a critique (on the president's signature), Jon summarizes Trump's 10-step "Art of the Deal" strategy with Iran ("a cycle of demands and threats and premature claims of victory"); Annalena Baerbock discusses the diplomatic challenges facing the United Nations and overseeing the selection process for the next Secretary-General.
4181	48	April 21	Michael Kosta	Noah Wyle	The Pitt
"The Worst Wing" covers allegations of on-the-job misbehavior by FBI chief Kash Patel and now-former Labor Secretary Lori Chavez-DeRemer; bad behavior by Chavez-DeRemer's husband and father leads to an updated Labor Department HR training video (its message: "no one wants to f**k you"); "Jordan Klepper Fingers the Pulse" of a TPUSA event in Phoenix; Noah Wyle on The Pitt's Season 2 exploration of mental health issues, how audiences consume the show differently from how they did ER in the 90s, and the life perspectives he's gained since his days playing John Carter.
4182	49	April 22	Michael Kosta	Maria Sharapova	Pretty Tough with Maria Sharapova podcast
Kash Patel dodges questions from the "fake news mafia" in "Headlines"; Michael summarizes Donald Trump's mixed signals on the Iran war, and gives Trump an Earth Day award for indirectly inspiring other nations to invest in renewable resources; Ronny Chieng, in the "InDecision 2026 Anal-a-Zone," reviews the "whole new crop" of D-list celebrities entering politics; Maria Sharapova on transferring her "pretty tough" attitude to the podcasting "manosphere," learning from losing, and one piece of advice she'd give to young tennis players ("don't miss").
4183	50	April 23	Michael Kosta	Ben McKenzie	Everyone Is Lying to You for Money
"Mess O'Potamia: America's Next Top Muddle" (Michael and Jordan Klepper on the firing of Navy Secretary John Phelan and his replacement's hatred of witches & love of "alpha" servicemembers); "The Art of the Altercation" (Desi Lydic on Donald Trump's vendetta against wind power); Ben McKenzie on the allure and dangers of cryptocurrency.
4184	51	April 27	Jon Stewart	Jodi Kantor	The New York Times; How to Start: Discovering Your Life's Work
Jon analyzes how the White House Correspondents' Dinner, "like most things in America… was interrupted by gunfire"; Triumph the Insult Comic Dog recalls his own trauma from the event (which he was covering for TDS); New York Times investigative reporter Jodi Kantor on revealing the Supreme Court's shadow docket correspondences, and encouraging college graduates to take a positive approach to their life's work.
4185	52	April 28	Josh Johnson	Gaten Matarazzo	Pizza Movie
Josh examines the GOP's post-shooting push to fund Donald Trump's ballroom with taxpayer money in "Let Them Eat Ballroom!"; in Times Square, Jordan Klepper asks foreign tourists if they have better security ideas than just "ballroom"; Triumph the Insult Comic Dog reins in the media and government glitterati at the White House Correspondents' Dinner; Gaten Matarazzo on making a "love letter to stoner movies" and returning to his theater roots in the upcoming film Octet.
4186	53	April 29	Josh Johnson	Ali Siddiq	The Custom Fit Tour; Ali Siddiq: My Two Sons
"Headlines" (King Charles cracks jokes before Congress, while Donald Trump's DOJ cracks down on James Comey over his "86 47" seashell photo); Grace Kuhlenschmidt decodes other treasonous messages on the beach; "In My Opinion" (Mo Amer kindly corrects anti-Muslim misconceptions); Ali Siddiq on staying a comedy independent, his post-incarceration mindset, and his first arena tour; "Your Moment of Zen" (Trump's gleeful reaction to the Louisiana v. Callais verdict).
4187	54	April 30	Josh Johnson	RZA	One Spoon of Chocolate
Josh covers Donald Trump making fun of the head of NASA and doing peace talks with Iran "telephonically," then with Ronny Chieng reviews the impact of and reactions to the Supreme Court effectively gutting the Voting Rights Act; Jordan Klepper surveys California's gubernatorial race from the "InDecision 2026 Anal-a-Zone"; RZA discusses putting One Spoon of Chocolate's actors in uncomfortable depictions of racism, and the inspirations behind his filmmaking and songwriting.

== May ==
No. overall	No. in season	Date	Hosted by	Guest	Promotion
4188	55	May 4	Jon Stewart	Sherrilyn Ifill	14th Amendment Center at Howard University School of Law
Jon analyses Donald Trump's faulty math & ignorance of Congressional authority over the war, the faultiness of America's three branches of government & the Fourth Estate, and Britain's visiting monarch becoming "the strongest defender of American democracy"; Sherrilyn Ifill on the Roberts-led Supreme Court's past and present weakening of the Voting Rights Act, and the redistricting efforts of Trump and Republicans; "Your Moment of Zen" (footage of Marco Rubio DJ'ing at a family wedding reception).
4189	56	May 5	Desi Lydic	Paul W. Downs	Hacks
"Headlines" (Jeff Bezos attends the Met Gala, airlines cut back or shut down, and Donald Trump brags again about cognitive tests); an ad for "Donny's Daycare," inspired by Trump discussing traumatic issues in a kid-filled Oval Office; Ronny Chieng & Michael Kosta go to "Sports War" over the "Kentucky HER-by," the Vrabel/Russini controversy, and the Sixers keeping Knicks fans away; in a cameo, Jet Li offers Ronny wisdom on losing less than Michael at gambling; Paul W. Downs on Hack's 5th & final season, its Season 4 late-night storyline, and addressing AI perils on the show.
4190	57	May 6	Desi Lydic	Marla Mindelle	Titanique
"Mess O'Potamia: America's Next Top Muddle" covers a single-page U.S./Iran proposal and Marco Rubio's quoting rap lyrics; Desi covers toxic White House debris at a golf course, and disagrees with Michael Kosta over Congressman Chuck Edwards' alleged creepiness; "America: 250 Years, Zero Complaints" (Troy Iwata asks people what from the U.S. of 2026 should be preserved for 2276); Marla Mindelle on Titanique's journey to Broadway, and incorporating improv & pop culture into the musical's "Celine Dion on the Titanic" plot.
4191	58	May 7	Desi Lydic	Adam Scott	Hokum
"Headlines" reviews Jeffrey Epstein's purported final thoughts and Donald Trump's ramble about auto-correct; Troy Iwata, Jordan Klepper, and Michael Kosta disagree over whether Trump could win in a fight (after surveyed Republicans believed they'd lose to Trump in such a situation); Josh Johnson goes "In Too Deep" over a sensationalized sexual harassment lawsuit at JPMorgan; Adam Scott on almost going by "Adam Cordero," playing a jerk in Hokum, and how David Letterman & Late Night inspired a love of showbiz in his youth.
4192	59	May 11	Jon Stewart	Josh Tyrangiel	The Atlantic; AI For Good: How Real People Are Using Artificial Intelligence to Fix Things That Matter
Jon puts the news media on blast for "trying to recapture that pandemic ratings magic" with their coverage of a cruise ship's hantavirus outbreak; Josh Tyrangiel on the need and effort to have AI work with humans instead of replace them.
4193	60	May 12	Jordan Klepper	Paul Dano	The Wizard of the Kremlin
"Headlines" finds Donald Trump getting some winks in while RFK, Jr. & Dr. Oz recall the good ol' days of teen parenthood; the Transportation secretary's corporate-underwritten YouTube travel show inspires Desi Lydic to go on her own family vacation with sponsorships; Ronny Chieng interviews the competing creators of AI-powered necklaces designed to alleviate male loneliness in "Eye on AI"; Paul Dano on depicting the man who helped guide Vladimir Putin's path to the Russian presidency.
4194	61	May 13	Jordan Klepper	Neil deGrasse Tyson	Take Me to Your Leader: Perspectives on Your First Alien Encounter
"Trump Meets World" finds Donald Trump chewing out a reporter over their White House ballroom inquiries as he heads to China with tech bros in tow; MAGA faithful complaints about not getting the Trump Mobile phones they paid for inspires an ad for "The Trump Give Me $100" ("You give us $100… and that's it"); "In My Opinion" (Charlamagne tha God finds no humor in Trump's third-term jokes); Neil deGrasse Tyson on the government's release of UFO files, the inaccuracies of alien depictions, and whether aliens would want to meet Trump.
4195	62	May 14	Jordan Klepper	Boots Riley	I Love Boosters
"Trump Meets World" (Brett Baier orders sausage from a robot in China, where stair climbs and private talks with Xi Jinping leave Donald Trump shaken); Ronny Chieng reluctantly corrects Josh Johnson's Asian references; "Tech Yeah!" (Grace Kuhlenschmidt on eavesdropping spaghetti sauce and robots being plane passengers, hit-and-run perps, & Buddhist monks); Boots Riley on upholding the working class and making art that pushes people to act; "Your Moment of Zen" (JD Vance compares himself to Macaulay Culkin in Home Alone).
4196	63	May 18	Jon Stewart	Chad P. Bown; Soumaya Keynes	How to Win a Trade War: An Optimistic Guide to an Anxious Global Economy
Jon criticizes Donald Trump for getting nothing out of the platitudes he gave China's president, and gives new graduates advice on acing job interviews "the Trump way" (e.g. firm handshake, dodge questions); Chad Bown (Peterson Institute for International Economics) and Soumaya Keynes (Financial Times' "The Economics Show") on U.S. trade vulnerabilities revealed by Trump's tariff war; "Your Moment of Zen" salutes Stephen Colbert by replaying Jon's classic "alphabet game" toss to Stephen's The Colbert Report. (Note: Stephen Colbert was a Daily Show correspondent from 1997-2005; his show The Colbert Report aired immediately after TDS from 2005 to 2014, after which he moved to CBS and The Late Show, whose final episode aired May 21, 2026.)
4197	64	May 19	Ronny Chieng	Brendan Fraser	Pressure
"CorruptTales" (Donald Trump hypes up his ballroom's architecture and his corporate investments while creating a slush fund for January 6 rioters); "Ko$ta Doin' Business" examines the ube trend and a billionaire branding "tax the rich" as hate speech, while news of counterfeit perfume inspires Michael Kosta's new product, "L'urine de Cheval"; Brendan Fraser on playing Dwight Eisenhower in Pressure and learning about the meteorological preparations for D-Day.
4198	65	May 20	Ronny Chieng	Jonnie Park (Dumbfoundead)	SPIT: A Life in Battles
"InDecision 2026" (Donald Trump gets ballot-box retribution against disloyal Republicans); Ronny examines Trump's original Iran War strategy and the Louisiana governor's attempt to win over Greenlanders; Jordan Klepper on the U.S. indictment of Cuba's former president; "Back in Black" (the "-maxxing" trend leaves Lewis Black maxed out); Dumbfoundead on chronicling his life as a battle rapper, actor, and writer.
4199	66	May 21	Ronny Chieng	"Weird Al" Yankovic	Bigger and Weirder 2026 Tour
Ronny on Donald Trump ogling over a Coast Guard Academy graduate and skipping his own son's wedding; an ad for "J6 Financial" caters to rioters seeking government cash; "America: 250 Years, Zero Complaints" fondly recalls the 1992 Olympic basketball dream team; "Weird Al" Yankovic on his parody songwriting process and wanting to make polka sexy again; "Your Moment of Zen" (Stephen Colbert's day with the White House press corps from the TDS archives).

== June ==
No. overall	No. in season	Date	Hosted by	Guest	Promotion
4200	67	June 1	Jon Stewart	Jason Bateman	DTF St. Louis; Black Rabbit
Jon notes how many of the artists who withdrew from Donald Trump's Freedom 250 concert share a booking agent (some other Jeff Epstein), and calls out Trump's tendency to promise peace deals more than close them; TDS alum Olivia Munn gives Jon the musical tribute she had hoped to give Stephen Colbert; "old dudes" Jon and Jason Bateman discuss aging, fatherhood, sending kids off to college, and learning what "DTF" means.
4201	68	June 2	Michael Kosta	Dr. Thomas Mather ("The TickGuy")	University of Rhode Island
"Headlines" covers Ivanka Trump & Jared Kushner's island purchase, and Congressional backlash over Donald Trump's J6 slush fund; "Mess O'Potamia: America's Next Top Muddle" covers Trump's vacillating over peace talks with Iran; "InDecision 2026 Anal-a-Zone" (Desi Lydic on scandals & claims surrounding a Senate candidate in Maine and a gubernatorial candidate in Colorado); URI professor of public health entomology Thomas Mather on identifying and protecting oneself from disease-carrying ticks.
4202	69	June 3	Michael Kosta	Chase Infiniti	The Testaments
Michael on Donald Trump's idea of keeping the White House's temporary UFC stage permanent; "InDecision 2026" recaps primaries for California governor and Los Angeles mayor; Ronny Chieng thinks an AWOL New Jersey congressman is the type of candidate Americans are looking for; Grace Kuhlenschmidt asks New York kids about the mayor's repeal of bedtime during the Knicks' NBA Finals run; Chase Infiniti on doing justice to Margaret Atwood's characters, lessons gained from One Battle After Another's set, and why Chicago & the Midwest will always be her home.
4203	70	June 4	Michael Kosta	Beth Stern	Coco and Stephen, Together Forever
After covering a "zombie attack" by Knicks fans, Michael ponders the proposed $250 bill, a J6 rioter taking a Pentagon job, a new intelligence chief with no intelligence experience, and Donald Trump putting the Lincoln Memorial Reflecting Pool through a "d**k-measuring contest"; "Jordan Klepper Fingers America 250" celebrations in New Orleans; Michael shares his own dog adoption story with Beth Stern, who discusses the inspiration behind her children's book, fostering rescue animals with husband Howard Stern, and promoting responsible pet adoption & ownership.
4204	71	June 8	Jon Stewart	Jane Fonda	Committee for the First Amendment; Rise Up, Sing Out: A Concert for the First Amendment
"Elmo" defends his NBA Finals neutrality because he wants both the Knicks and Spurs to "hit the over"; Jon hopes Donald Trump's storming out of a Meet the Press interview will "give journalists permission to not back down" and challenge Trump further; Jane Fonda on her, and the entertainment industry's, history of activism, and reanimating the rights organization her father was a part of.
4205	72	June 9	Desi Lydic	Laverne Cox	Transcendent
"Headlines" covers Donald Trump's NBA Finals nap, his getting booed outside & inside MSG, and his unproven claim that vote rigging led to Spencer Pratt's mayoral primary loss in Los Angeles, where Troy Iwata assures Desi that slow vote counts are laid-back normal; "The DailyShowography" summarizes Mark Zuckerberg's "status update" history; Laverne Cox on going from a childhood of trauma to an adulthood of purpose & self-love, and how the right wing's weakening of trans people's rights also weakens those of every citizen.
4206	73	June 10	Desi Lydic	Nina Dobrev	The Get Out
"Headlines" (US/Iran tensions increase while Melania Trump talks up the age of AI); Jordan Klepper thinks commemorative coins (the same kind Donald Trump is selling for UFC Freedom 250) could fix inflation; "So Not Our Problem!" (Troy Iwata on a sinking Mexico City, drunk deer in France, addictive claw machines in Hong Kong, and yeast from an Italian mummy); Nina Dobrev on her "totally unhinged" The Get Out character, wild off-screen pursuits, advocating for equal pay, and producing stories "for women, by women."
4207	74	June 11	Desi Lydic	Chris Evert; Martina Navratilova	Chris & Martina: The Final Set
Desi celebrates the Knicks' Game 4 comeback win, and covers how Donald Trump will be celebrating his birthday (a UFC fight, an algae-filled pool, and a not-yet-set deal with Iran); Ronny Chieng & Michael Kosta debate all things Knicks in "Sports War"; at her invitation, Michael joins in on Desi's talk with Chris Evert & Martina Navratilova, who discuss the personal & global impacts of their tennis rivalry and supporting each other during their cancer diagnoses; "Your Moment of Zen" (Rep. Troy Nehls claims Trump "was born a very special baby").
4208	75	June 15	Jon Stewart	U.S. Senator Raphael Warnock of Georgia	Ebenezer Baptist Church; The Crooked Places Made Straight: Reflections on the Moral Meaning of America
After opining on Donald Trump's pending deal with Iran, Jon offers up two contrasts: The Knicks' NBA Finals win against Trump's UFC Freedom 250, and what New Yorkers really are (diverse, hard-working, generally peaceful) versus how right-wing media views them (liberal, elitist, violent); Raphael Warnock on serving as both U.S. Senator and senior pastor of the church MLK, Jr. once led, and how attitudes toward marginalized groups are an "acid test" of faith.
4209	76	June 16	Jordan Klepper	Britt Lower	I Will Find You
"Trump Meets World" (the president shows off his peace plan at the G7 summit and anticipates dinner at Versailles); Jordan reviews a MAGA podcaster's claim that saboteurs added algae to the Lincoln Memorial Reflecting Pool; Desi Lydic asks government employees who felt DOGE's chainsaw in 2025 why they want to rejoin government as elected officials in 2026; Britt Lower on connecting with her I Will Find You character, sharing a birthday with co-star Sam Worthington, and the lessons she gained from improv.
4210	77	June 17	Jordan Klepper	John Early	Maddie's Secret
Scotland's Tartan Army drinks Boston dry, while JD Vance's book-tour charm offensive goes dry; Donald Trump blames others for his questionable Iran accord, which Ronny Chieng thinks everyone should applaud lest Trump want to restart the war; Jordan "Fingers the Pulse" of the UFC Freedom 250 event at the White House; John Early on making Maddie's Secret humorously play on melodramatic TV movie tropes.
4211	78	June 18	Jordan Klepper	Johnny Knoxville	Jackass: Best and Last
Jordan dives into how the Islamabad Memorandum gives Iran all Donald Trump had promised they'd never receive; Josh Johnson tries to strongarm Iran into a better deal (only to get roughed up); Triumph the Insult Comic Dog speaks with Knicks fans (Jon Stewart included) at the team's championship parade; Johnny Knoxville gives Jordan colonoscopy advice, recalls his terrifying first film scene, and contends that Jackass may be the answer to male loneliness.
4212	79	June 22	Jon Stewart	Maggie Haberman; Jonathan Swan	The New York Times; Regime Change: Inside the Imperial Presidency of Donald Trump
Jon makes fun of the Reflecting Pool turning Mountain Dew green, JD Vance's Iran peace talks going "from bad to wallflower," and Vance & Donald Trump's back-down from the demands they made of Iran during the war; Maggie Haberman and Jonathan Swan discuss how Trump's second presidency has been based on hubris, gut feelings, and beliefs that the president is someone of destiny.
4213	80	June 23	Josh Johnson	Lou Diamond Phillips	Gangland
Scotland's Tartan Army takes over Miami; "Wet Hot American Crisis" covers Donald Trump's Reflecting Pool obsession and his claim that vandalism led to its algae buildup (infected water that Michael Kosta tempts himself into drinking); Lewis Black analyzes dangerous summer fitness trends in "Back in Black"; Lou Diamond Phillips on Gangland's spotlighting of Indigenous stories & talent, and how, as governor of AMPAS' Actors Branch, he encourages young artists to forbear fleeting trends.
4214	81	June 24	Josh Johnson	Jay Pharoah	The Quiz with Balls; The Odyssey
World Cup visitors obsess over ranch dressing; "InDecision 2026" finds Josh analyzing the success of Zohran Mamdani-backed candidates in the New York primaries, and spotlighting the difference between Mamdani's endorsement of public servants and Donald Trump's backing of loyalists; Troy Iwata goes "sad trombone" in reporting on John Paulson's plan to move a brass instrument maker's jobs to China; Jay Pharoah adds impersonations to a table read of Josh's political drama, discusses the 10-year development of his new comedy album, and reveals what happens when Quiz with Balls contestants don't fall into its pool.

== July ==
No. overall	No. in season	Date	Hosted by	Guest	Promotion
4125	82	July 7	Ronny Chieng	Ann M. Martin	The Baby-Sitters Club Fan Edition: Baby-Sitter Summer
Ronny covers Donald Trump's rambling July 4th speech, analyzes Trump's meddling in the FIFA World Cup, and insists a flag-carrying parachutist's crash is not a metaphor for America; "Tech Yeah!" (Grace Kuhlenschmidt on robotic flamethrowers, robotic toilets, a dopamine delivery app, and Tilly Norwood's big break); Ann M. Martin discusses The Baby-Sitters Club's history of diverse characters & real-world issues, while superfan Ronny offers reboot ideas & lingering plot questions.
4126	83	July 8	Ronny Chieng	Mayor Aftab Pureval of Cincinnati	n/a
NATO throws a love-in for Donald Trump in "Trump Meets World," while the president belittles Spain, covets Greenland (again), and ends the cease fire with the Islamic Republic of Iran (or is it "The Islamic Republic of Japan"?); Ronny analyzes health concerns surrounding Mitch McConnell, while Michael Kosta defends the not-dead senator against Ronny's skepticism; Aftab Pureval on leading a "bright blue" city in a red state and the no-nonsense nature of local government.
4127	84	July 9	Ronny Chieng	Aaron Chen	The Dink
Ronny examines why Donald Trump grounded his new Qatari-gifted Air Force One, and the scandal-plagued Graham Platner's exit from Maine's Senate race; Desi Lydic gets manly to replace Platner as nominee; "InDecision 2026 Anal-a-Zone" (Jordan Klepper on the use of AI in political ads); Aaron Chen recalls meeting Ronny at 16, and discusses working with acting greats, and giving acting advice to Andy Roddick, on the set of The Dink; "Your Moment of Zen" (JD Vance tries a "Wis-CAAN-sin" accent).
4128	85	July 13	Jon Stewart	Christopher Nolan	The Odyssey
Jon mocks Donald Trump's backhanded tribute to Lindsey Graham before using Graham's death and a fellow Senator's health issues as a springboard into a critique of Washington's gerontocracy problem; Christopher Nolan on why the success of Oppenheimer paved the way for They Odyssey.
4129	86	July 14	Michael Kosta	Beth Kobliner	Get a Financial Life: Personal Finance in Your Twenties and Thirties
"Headlines" (Lindsey Graham's sister succeeds him as Senator, while Donald Trump hypes up an IndyCar race); "Mess O'Potamia: America's Next Top Muddle" (the U.S. and Iran trade barbs and bombs over Hormuz Strait tolls); "The Guardian of the Straight of Hormuz" will protect the waterway… for a price; TDS historians (and an actual historian) rank Lenny Kravitz's wardrobe malfunction as one of America's greatest moments; Beth Kobliner discusses the need to educate young people about personal finance, and fields questions from "broke Daily Show staff."
4130	87	July 15	Michael Kosta	Molly Shannon	The Hawk
Michael examines the cyclosporiasis outbreak in the U.S., and what is and isn't being done to combat "forever diarrhea"; "In My Opinion" (John Leguizamo wonders why conservatives disagree with the constitutional right to birthright citizenship); Molly Shannon on her friendship with Will Ferrell, how childhood trauma informs her comedy, and the life advice she gives to her kids and young people.
4131	88	July 16	Michael Kosta	Jake Johnson	The Dink
Fixations in "The Worst Wing": Pete Hegseth on soldiers' testosterone levels, JD Vance on how Joe Biden eats ice cream, Vance's security team on his personal helicopter use, and Donald Trump's teleprompter operator on speech-based wagers; Michael and Desi Lydic go to "Sports War" over the biggest World Cup headlines; Jake Johnson on learning the language of tennis, giving impractical advice, and the joy of raising daughters.
4132	89	July 20	Jon Stewart	Ben Wikler	This Is The Plan: How to End America’s Meltdown and Save Democracy former chair of Democratic Party of Wisconsin
Jon comments on how Donald Trump (or was it the "backup Trump"?) photobombed Spain's World Cup trophy hoist, then analyzes Trump's rehashing of 2020 election conspiracy theories, and how his administration's non-DEI "meritocracy" has led to incompetent government and broken promises; Ben Wikler discusses how Wisconsin overcame a GOP stranglehold of government, and what it will take to rebuild the Democrats' stature nationally.
4133	90	July 21	Desi Lydic	Megan Rapinoe	Why Are You Like This? podcast
Desi examines the Trump administration's latest tariffs on Canada, then digs into conservatives' claims that eating at Olive Garden is more secure than voting; Josh Johnson investigates the belief that Iran sitting on an interdimensional stargate is the real reason for going to war with them; Megan Rapinoe discusses going from soccer player to podcaster and losing a brand deal over her LGBTQ+ advocacy, then fields questions submitted by Desi's soccer-playing son.
4134	91	July 22	Desi Lydic	Elliot Page	The Odyssey
"I hope you brought us a present, because tonight The Daily Show turns 30!" "Mess O'Potamia: America's Next Top Muddle" (Greg Kelly and the rest of conservative media downplay the extended length of the Iran war); Desi wonders why Donald Trump and his cabinet are spending so much time on TikTok (or is it "TicTac"?); highlights from TDS "30 F#@in' Years" are shown in a chronological montage; Elliot Page on how The Odyssey still resonates in modern times, and director Christopher Nolan's desire to "get the best possible shot [and] tell the best possible story"; "Your Moment of Zen" ("Here it is, your Moment of Zen" introductions from across the decades).
4135	92	July 23	Desi Lydic	Karolina Wydra	Pluribus
Donald Trump "reboots the Red Scare" in "Headlines," while Don, Jr. profits from his dad's presidency and insists he's never done cocaine; Ronny Chieng insists he's never done cocaine with Don, Jr. either; "In My Opinion" (Leslie Jones schools the right, and white people, on the continued need to stick up for Black people); Karolina Wydra discusses using meditation & dream work to channel her Pluribus character, and shares the crazy way she landed the role after being away from acting.
4136	93	July 27	Jon Stewart	Kaitlan Collins	CNN; The Source with Kaitlan Collins
In analyzing "The White House Correspondents' Dinner, Part Deux," Jon critiques Donald Trump's cringe-inducing joke attempts and blasts the event's “memorializing" of the "collegial and cozy relationship" between the presidency and the press corps that covers it; CNN chief White House correspondent Kaitlan Collins discusses the changes in the press corps over the past decade, making sure "it's not about me" when she asks questions, and staying unflappable in the face of Trump's frequent insults.
4137	94	July 28	Jordan Klepper	Jeff Hiller	Pluribus; Widow's Bay
"Headlines" covers Donald Trump getting called a "pedophile protector" again, Canada quietly opening a new bridge to the U.S., and Operation Southern Spear failing to curtail drug trafficking; previously unaired "Fingers the Pulse" footage shows Jordan surveying an anti-ICE protest of "lefty nudists" in Portland; "Back in Black" (Lewis Black on the privacy-obliterating use of technology); Jeff Hiller tells "fellow tall person" Jordan about his 7-minute (and Emmy-nominated) Pluribus role, employing improv on Widow's Bay, and how he answers "aren't you that guy from…" questions.
4138	95	July 29	Jordan Klepper	Twin Temple (Alexandra James & Zachary James)	Doomed Lovers
"Headlines" (the DNC gets scammed out of $29K, while Donald Trump & Sean Hannity don't exactly eulogize Lindsey Graham at his funeral); Troy Iwata reports from Sen. Graham's Mar-a-Lago-like Heaven; an ad for the "Presidential Neck Vag," which allows MAGA bros to have the same fleshy neck folds as Trump; Twin Temple performs "Haunt Me" after discussing what they call "Satanic doo-wop."
4139	96	July 30	Jordan Klepper	Theo Baker	How to Rule the World: An Education in Power at Stanford University
Jordan analyzes the contentious interrogation of former USAID head Anthony Fauci during a Senate hearing; Michael Kosta insists to New Yorkers that John Stamos (appearing in person) is the greatest American of all time; Theo Baker recalls his freshman-year research into misconduct by Stanford's president, and discusses the university's "Faustian bargain" with Silicon Valley.

== September ==
No. overall	No. in season	Date	Hosted by	Guest	Promotion
4140	97	September 8	Jon Stewart	Governor Spencer Cox of Utah	Off Ramp: How to Be a Peacemaker in an Age of Contempt
Jon compares America under Donald Trump to the rusty hull of the USS Abraham Lincoln, examines Trump's recent meme-making & lake-renaming, and spotlights how Trump aide Natalie Harp enforces his "warped reality"; Ronny Chieng steps up to be Jon's own Harp-like aide; Spencer Cox on his belief that good-faith debate will overcome American political polarization.
4141	98	September 9	Michael Kosta	Jia Tolentino	The New Yorker
GOP lawmakers make excuses for avoiding Donald Trump's midterm convention; Michael and Jordan Klepper on the right's anger over New York mayor Zohran Mamdani's 9/11 commemorations; "In Too Deep" (Josh Johnson on a how a man scammed women by posing as an NFL player); The New Yorker staff writer Jia Tolentino discusses how social media & big tech have changed perceptions of beauty.
4142	99	September 10	Michael Kosta	Andrew Garfield	The Uprising
"InDecision 2026: The Midyssey" recaps a GOP convention full of weird behavior and questionable promises; Desi Lydic hypes up the convention's platform; "So Not Our Problem" (Troy Iwata on a Titanic-themed slide in Britain, a fake ancient theater in Italy, and a new use for Hitler's birthplace in Austria); Andrew Garfield on gaining empathy through acting, and how England's Peasants' Revolt of 1381 mirrors the politics of 2026.
4143	100	September 15	Josh Johnson	Danielle Brooks	If I Go Will They Miss Me
"Headlines" (Mitch McConnell returns to the Senate in time for the AI apocalypse); Michael Kosta channels his inner Walter White to examine whether sulfur-filled balloons can cool a warming climate; Danielle Brooks on filming If I Go Will They Miss Me on location in Watts, and how motherhood influences the roles she portrays.
4144	101	September 16	Josh Johnson	Colin Kaepernick	The Perilous Fight
"The Worst Wing" examines Pete Hegseth's "impeccable" military grooming standards, Donald Trump, Jr.'s Russian-funded wedding, and Kash Patel's softer stance towards bestiality by FBI candidates; Jordan Klepper approves of Patel leading America's attention "down the rabbit's hole"; at a Canadian bar in New York City, Ronny Chieng fields polite opinions on the US-Canada trade war; Colin Kaepernick reflects on the importance of activism and the 10-year anniversary of his anthem kneel.
4145	102	September 17	Michael Kosta	Giri Nathan	Defector Media; Changeover: A Young Rivalry and a New Era of Men's Tennis
"Headlines" covers new public restrooms in New York City, while "Mess O'Potamia: America's Next Top Muddle" examines how attacks in the Hormuz and Bab al-Mandab straits are driving diesel fuel prices (and in turn prices on everything else) higher; an ad for the "Trump Promisero" sedan, which runs on the president's promises that gas prices will decrease; Michael and Ronny Chieng go to "Sports War" over Jameis Winston's cologne kick, Sydney Sweeney's naked sports-betting ad, and a Hyrox athlete's soiled run; Giri Nathan on the rise of Carlos Alcaraz & Jannik Sinner, the US Open's on- and off-court drama, and how tennis' popularity can grow while its traditions are adhered to.
4146	103	September 21	Jon Stewart	Ari Emanuel	Roll the Calls: A Memoir; WME Group & TKO Group Holdings
Jon opines on Donald Trump's latest beef with the White House press corps; Desi Lydic disguises herself as a gold Oval Office ornament to get around Trump's press ban; Jon examines how the right is more fearful of immigrants than they are of AI; Ari Emanuel discusses overcoming dyslexia & anger issues to advocate for himself in business & personal matters, and tells why his brother Rahm would be an incredible president (though Rahm has no plans to run).
4147	104	September 22	Desi Lydic	Tom Morello	Everyone Gets Everything They Want; Power to the People Festival
"Exclusive audio" (since the press corps boycotted the event) of Donald Trump's remarks at the White House helipad dedication; Desi examines Trump's bro-out with Zohran Mamdani and dissing of nations (and Kaitlan Collins) at the UN; Josh Johnson interviews John Alite, mob enforcer turned Englishtown, New Jersey councilman; Tom Morello on working with his son on Everyone Gets Everything They Want, and how his late mother inspired his activism.
4148	105	September 23	Desi Lydic	Jessica Tarlov	The Five on Fox News; Raging Moderates podcast I Disagree: Winning Arguments Without Losing Friends
"The Worst Wing" (Donald Trump doesn't realize Marco Rubio's right next to him, while Jeanine Pirro shows off a Martian meteorite); Melania Trump hypes a women's networking system, while a trailer hypes her upcoming docuseries ("Melania 2… if that's what we're calling it"); "InDecision 2026 Anal-a-Zone" (Michael Kosta summarizes midterm candidates' scandalous behavior); Jessica Tarlov on how to go toe-to-toe in debates ("Lead with your humanity, and listen more than you talk").
4149	106	September 24	Desi Lydic	Merritt Wever	Primetime
"Headlines" (Tommy Tuberville turns furrydom into an air travel threat, while Donald Trump is startled by his flyover for Xi Jinping); Jordan Klepper says showing Washington's shortcomings to Xi was part of Trump's summit plan; "Tech Yeah!" (Grace Kuhlenschmidt on big-breasted robots, immolating robo-lympians, and Apple's latest gadgets); Merritt Wever on her TDS audience experiences, her viral Emmy acceptance speech, and the commingling of news, entertainment, and law enforcement dramatized in Primetime.
4150	107	September 28	Jon Stewart	Evan Gershkovich	The Wall Street Journal; This Cursed Beautiful Land: A Russian-American Story
Jon examines Donald Trump's week of wooing Xi Jinping, and throws cold water on the thought that Republicans will denounce Trump's offer to sell weapons to China; Evan Gershkovich discusses his life before, during, and after his imprisonment (on false espionage charges) in Russia, what a post-Putin Russia might look like, and the totalitarian warning signs he sees in the U.S.
4151	108	September 29	Jordan Klepper	Marlon James	The Disappearers
A look at the America.gov AI chatbot and criticisms over taxpayer-funded pro-Trump propaganda; Jordan interviews "Brad", a character in a campaign ad by Arkansas' GOP governor that's infuriating conservatives (since "Brad" is a lazy white person collecting welfare); Michael Kosta presents an "America 250: In Memoriam" segment; Marlon James discusses hiding his sexuality in his native Jamaica, depicting sex & violence in his work, and how literature spotlights those that mainstream history erases.
4152	109	September 30	Jordan Klepper	CMAT	Euro-Country
Jordan analyzes a White House summit on AI that produced no regulations on AI, and how Eric Schmitt's Senate hearing attack on former special counsel Jack Smith backfired spectacularly; CMAT discusses weaving "funeral humor" into her music, and how her album's title track (which she also performs) examines the repercussions of politicians' actions.

== October ==
No. overall	No. in season	Date	Hosted by	Guest	Promotion
4153	110	October 1	Jordan Klepper	John Wilson	The History of Concrete
"Headlines" (Donald Trump invents a new Hispanic stereotype, while Pete Hegseth celebrates his purge of "beardos," "weirdos," etc. from the military); Josh Johnson offers updates from Hegseth's team studying the future of warfare; "In My Opinion" (Nick Offerman celebrates Gen Z putting down the phone and taking up hobbies); Jordan pitches a new documentary project to John Wilson, who discusses finding beauty in the mundane.
4154	111	October 5	Jon Stewart	Jacob Coxon	Former researcher at OpenAI and Anthropic
In an episode devoted to artificial intelligence ("We're talking about it on the whole show, from 'A' to 'I'"), Jon examines Donald Trump's laissez-faire approach to the technology, and tech CEOs' awkward efforts in promoting its pluses & hiding its minuses; "Muse," Meta's cute AI agent, tries to get on Jon's good side… before turning sinister; Jacob Coxon discusses blowing the whistle over the risks of the AI he trained, and the irresponsibility & megalomania that underlies the industry.
4155	112	October 6	Michael Kosta	Aaron Sorkin	The Social Reckoning
"InDecision 2026: The Midyssey" examines GOP struggles & faux pas on the campaign trail; with Donald Trump endorsing year-round daylight saving time, "Mordok the Clock Keeper" discusses the cost of changing clocks twice a year; Jordan Klepper interviews a pardoned J6 rioter seeking monetary restitution from the government; Aaron Sorkin on revisiting Mark Zuckerberg 16 years after The Social Network and balancing his writing & directing skills (the former of which once resulted in a broken nose).
4156	113	October 7	Michael Kosta	Sebastian Stan	Fjord
"Is This How We Die?" (Michael on car-devouring sinkholes, contaminated frozen food, and the pneumonic plague in Russia); Josh Johnson wonders whether suffering grisly death is better than returning to quarantine; Lewis Black critiques peculiar approaches to fending off The Grim Reaper in "Black in Black"; Sebastian Stan on his career choices, his personal connections to Fjord, and reconnecting with the country he left behind at a young age.
4157	114	October 8	Michael Kosta	Kyle MacLachlan	Fictional Selves
"The Worst Wing" explores quid pro quo allegations between Ambassador to Greece Kimberly Guilfoyle and a Donald Trump donor; an ad for the website "Donnie's List" assures that Trump donors can "have confidence in your con men"; Grace Kuhlenschmidt on how Trump's border wall plan is impacting the jaguar population in Arizona's San Rafael Valley; Kyle MacLachlan on his relationship with David Lynch, the wine label he started with his dad, and learning to advocate for himself in Hollywood.
4158	115	October 19	Jon Stewart	David Corn	Mother Jones; How Russia Won: Donald Trump, Vladimir Putin, and the Fight for America
Jon criticizes JD Vance's anti-immigrant rhetoric and Emmanuel Macron's concert attendance while Paris burns, then phones key players to ask why diesel prices are still high and Ukrainian defenses can't access Starlink; Mother Jones Washington bureau chief David Corn discusses Donald Trump's "big f**ks small" theory and his fascination over Vladimir Putin; Jon thanks TDS' staff, audience, and "the dancer in the sky" in acknowledging the show's renewal thru 2028; "Your Moment of Zen" (Trump delights in making fun of Abdul El-Sayed's name).
4159	116	October 20	Michael Kosta	Ben Gibbard Death Cab For Cutie	I Built You A Tower
"InDecision 2026: The Midyssey" (Vivek Ramaswamy recruits his opponent's estranged mom for an attack ad, while a county council candidate in Indiana gets tipsy before an interview); Donald Trump sizing up Jon Husted's physique inspires a campaign ad for the Ohio senator ("finally, an ass worthy of a Senate seat"); Jordan Klepper says "hello" and "goodbye" to ex-White House Press Secretary Katie Zacharia in "News to Meet You"; Death Cab for Cutie performs "Stone Over Water" after lead singer Ben Gibbard discusses finding transcendence in running ultramarathons and how songwriting is no substitute for therapy.
4160	117	October 21	Ronny Chieng	Taika Waititi	Klara & The Sun
"The Worst Wing" (JD Vance can't say what he's good at, while a Venezuelan billionaire bribes Donald Trump for a pardon); Ronny thinks ableism is the reason Trump scuttled Pete Hegseth's plan to livestream the Nidal Hasan execution (since Hasan is a paraplegic); "In My Opinion" (Mo Amer on how Abdul El-Sayed is charming Michigan voters in the face of Islamophobia); Ronny shares his experience working with Taika Waititi, who discusses his native New Zealand's film industry and giving back to the communities that make his movies possible.
4161	118	October 22	Ronny Chieng	Jimmy O. Yang	Finally Home
"InDecision 2026: The Midyssey" (Donald Trump lusts over Tim Scott & renaming bodies of water as races tighten); Ronny and Michael Kosta argue over Maine Senate candidate Troy Jackson's funky family tree; "The People Behind the People" spotlights "Sheryl B. Bahama," the "chief deniability officer" making sure GOP lawmakers sidestep questions about Trump's actions; Ronny and longtime friend Jimmy O. Yang discuss how the latter's Hong Kong roots & childhood diary inspired his stand-up special; "Your Moment of Zen" (Newt Gingrich says Ronald Reagan "was not an ass man").
4162	119	October 26	Jon Stewart	Matthew Cole	Princes and Thieves: Jared Kushner and Mohamed bin Zayed’s Secret Plot to Remake the Middle East
Jon examines Donald Trump celebrating big butts, Big Oil, and replaying "'Scary Muslim' from 2016" in the days before the mid-term elections, then ponders just who the "you" in the 2024 "Trump is for you" campaign ad was referring to ("My guess is… 'you' was actually them"); Matthew Cole discusses his 5-year investigation into Jared Kushner's alleged secret arrangements with Arab rulers (acknowledging up-front that Kushner's lawyer has denied the findings).
Special	Special	October 26	Jordan Klepper	n/a	n/a
The Daily Show Presents: Jordan Klepper Fingers the Pulse — Red Flags; Jordan travels the country to gauge the state of Donald Trump's MAGA coalition in the lead-up to Election Day 2026.
4163	120	October 27	Jordan Klepper	Morgana Robinson	Ali G: Who Iz I?
"InDecision 2026: The Midyssey" (Barack Obama comparing Donald Trump's White House decor to The Cheesecake Factory has right-wing media defending… The Cheesecake Factory); TDS alum John Hodgman on whether one lifelong Mainer or another will be elected to the Senate; "InDecision 2026 Anal-A-Zone" (Desi Lydic on political campaign cash influencing influencers); Morgana Robinson on auditioning for, improvising in, and staying in-character throughout Ali G: Who Iz I?
4164	121	October 28	Jordan Klepper	David Byrne	Sleeping Beauties: Why Good Ideas Go Dormant and How They Wake Up
"InDecision 2026: The Midyssey" examines Donald Trump's ongoing ass-ogling and a Tennessee candidate's "youthful indiscretion at [age] 53"; Jordan details the controversy over not one but two Dan Sullivans in Alaska's Senate race; "In My Opinion" (Charlamagne Tha God on how the midterms have become a masculinity contest); David Byrne discusses unheralded works by celebrated peoples, how hubris ignores wisdom, and writing & performing "Let Me Sell You A Dream" for the film Musk.
4165	122	October 29	Jordan Klepper	Tracy Letts	I Play Rocky
The GOP amps up the fearmongering in the final days of "InDecision 2026: The Midyssey"; Michael Kosta hears from both sides in California's wealth tax campaign; Tracy Letts on chronicling the making of Rocky, his movie collection, and lessons learned from Chicago improv; "Your Moment of Zen" (an in memoriam to Patrick Stewart).

== November ==
No. overall	No. in season	Date	Hosted by	Guest	Promotion
4166	123	November 2	Jon Stewart	Michael Lewis	Blockers: Rebels in the Deep State
Jon analyzes "Donald Trump's 'I had it cleaned' speech" and Haley Stevens' endorsement about-face in Michigan, then blasts the news media for their addiction to campaign poll numbers; Michael Lewis on the civil servants who countered DOGE's government-cutting efforts.
4167	124	November 3	Ronny Chieng	Min Jin Lee	American Hagwon
"InDecision 2026: Some of America Decides" (Ronny summarizes peculiar election news); Troy Iwata & Grace Kuhlenschmidt ask New Yorkers who they voted for; Josh Johnson sizes up presidential contenders from what is now the "InDecision 2028 Anal-A-Zone"; Min Jin Lee discusses her novel's exploration of Korean hagwons, Asia's educational traditions, and why bad things happen to good people.
4168	125	November 4	Michael Kosta	Erica Chenoweth	Harvard Kennedy School; Civil Resistance: What Everyone Needs to Know
"InDecision 2026: Some of America Decides" recaps Democrats' big wins, the GOP's big losses, right-wing media's excuses, and Elon Musk's blown campaign cash; Troy Iwata really needs the $5,000 Donald Trump promised voters; Michael covers Trump's "I wasn't on the ballot" excuse and his celebration of Guam's governorship going Republican; an ad conveys how Trump is still committed to helping everyday Americans… by still obsessing over his ballroom project; Harvard Kennedy School professor & political scientist Erica Chenoweth on what constitutes successful resistance against dictatorships (including the 3.5% rule), and how Americans can still be engaged after Election Night.
4169	126	November 5	Jordan Klepper	Teddy Schleifer	The New York Times
"InDecision 2026: Some of America Decides" (conservatives go mournful over Election Night results); a New York congressional district stays red while its victor goes blue; "Tech Yeah!" (Grace Kuhlenschmidt on ChatGPT's voting advice, Elon Musk's flying car, and a robot bodyguard); New York Times billionaires reporter Teddy Schleifer on the role of dark money & the ultra-wealthy in political spending, and why real political change can take years to happen.
4170	127	November 9	Jon Stewart	Rachel Maddow	The Rachel Maddow Show on MS NOW; Department of Fate: The Promise, the Power, and the Collapse of America’s Most Consequential Institution
MAGA pundits berate, and 60 Minutes' Ross Douthat grills, Donald Trump; Jon lists how new White House Chief of Staff Stephen Miller violates the "qualities" of honesty and levelheadedness needed in the role; at the White House, demonic signs surround Jordan Klepper on Miller's first day as Chief of Staff; Rachel Maddow on working Election Night for MS NOW, the importance of not only Congress but state governments flipping blue, and Trump's scuttling of the Department of Justice during his second term.
4171	128	November 10	Desi Lydic	Kathryn Hahn	Madden
Desi dissects the Jensen Huang scandal while Josh Johnson defends the Nvidia CEO; "Sports War" (Ronny Chieng & Jordan Klepper on Cristiano Ronaldo's retirement, Mike Tomlin's Minecraft city, and the University of Maryland's free-tuition raffle); Kathryn Hahn on dramatizing the life & career of John Madden, improvising with Nicolas Cage, and earning cool-mom credit for starring in the live-action Tangled.
4172	129	November 11	Desi Lydic	Ron Howard	Avedon
Desi tells TDS' last Lauren Boebert handjob jokes (due to Boebert's projected election loss), and with Michael Kosta recaps how absent House Democrats allowed Pete Hegseth to dodge impeachment (Michael: "Not doing their best is what they do best"); "Black in Black" (Lewis Black on over-pampered pets); Ron Howard on documenting the life & career of Richard Avedon, and preserving artistry & humanity in the AI age.
4173	130	November 12	Desi Lydic	Heather Cox Richardson	Boston College; Letters from an American on Substack; Democracy Awakening: Notes on the State of America
"Headlines" (Jensen Huang cheats on his mistress while Mississippi turns blue and sends a Black man to the Senate); Grace Kuhlenschmidt joins Susan Bauer and the Old Ladies Against Underwater Garbage in cleaning up a Cape Cod pond; BC history professor Heather Cox Richardson on how 2026 compares to past changemaking elections, the need for government accountability, and the historical figures she'd invite to a hypothetical dinner with Donald Trump.
4174	131	November 16	Jon Stewart	Beastie Boys (Michael Diamond & Adam Horovitz)	Licensed to Ill 40th anniversary reissue
Jon doesn't buy the Trump Administration's excuses for grounding plane traffic nationwide, nor their reasons for prioritizing tech oligarchs ahead of their creation's dangers; Mike D and Ad-Rock discuss the Beastie Boys' formation in the 1980s and New York's influence on their sound.
4175	132	November 17	Michael Kosta	Daniel Susskind	Gresham College; What Should My Children Do? A Human’s Guide to the Age of AI
"Is This How We Die?" (planes are grounded, tech goes out, and a garbage landfill explodes, but Donald Trump just shrugs it off); Josh Johnson says Trump isn't the only one Iran is threatening with a billboard; Grace Kuhlenschmidt interviews Indianapolis councilman Nick Roberts and his twin brother (and political polar opposite) Nathan; Gresham College business professor Daniel Susskind on teaching the next generation to use technology & AI in a risk-aware way.
4176	133	November 18	Michael Kosta	Chloe Radcliffe	Eyes Down Here
"InDecision 2026: Some of America Decides" (Mary Peltola betters two Dan Sullivans for Alaska's Senate seat); Manila breaks out the red carpet (and "YMCA") for Donald Trump while his administration tries to explain recent tech outages; Troy Iwata fields New Yorkers' thoughts on the outages; "In My Opinion" (Michelle Wolf on gender discrepancies in health care); Michael and fellow cyclist Chloe Radcliffe discuss her birthmark, her Midwestern roots, and using billboards for her Comedy Central special to address past crushes.
4177	134	November 19	Michael Kosta	Gemma Chan	Josephine
