= Dazi =

Dazi may refer to:

- Dagzê, Lhasa, a district of Lhasa, Tibet
- Dazi Culture, A limited social relationship that became popular in China in the 2020s
