= Twin Temple =

American band

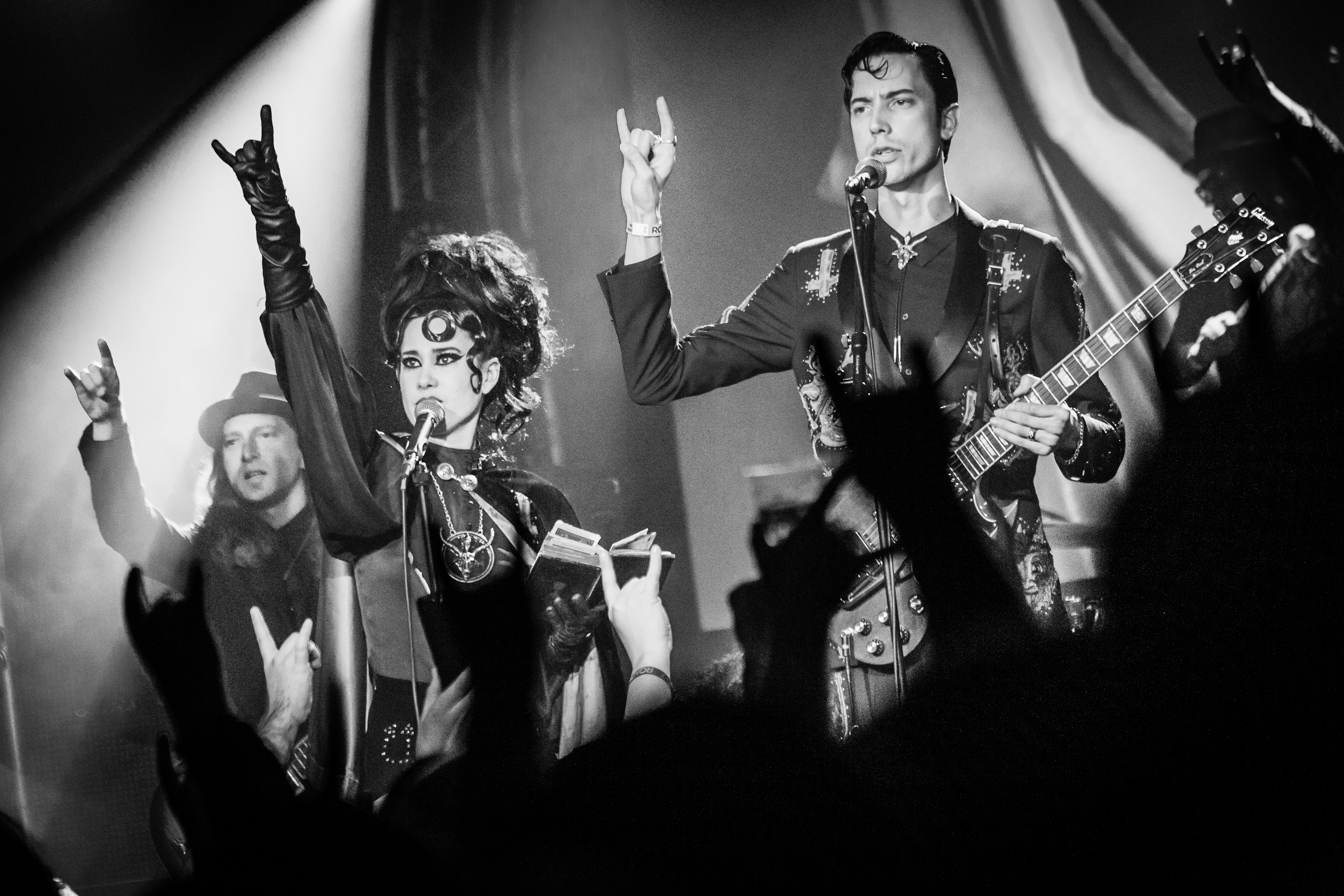
- Twin Temple performing in 2019

Background information
- Origin: Los Angeles, California, U.S.
- Genres: Rock and roll; traditional pop
- Years active: 2017–present
- Labels: Pentagrammaton; Rise Above
- Members: Alexandra James; Zachary James
- Website: twintemple.com

Twin Temple is an American rock duo formed by the married couple Alexandra and Zachary James who self-describe their sound as "Satanic doo-wop".

They are influenced by American rock and roll bands of the 1950s and 1960s, such as The Platters, Roy Orbison, and Buddy Holly, and have been compared to Amy Winehouse. They have incorporated their practice of Satanism with this musical era and culture.

== History ==
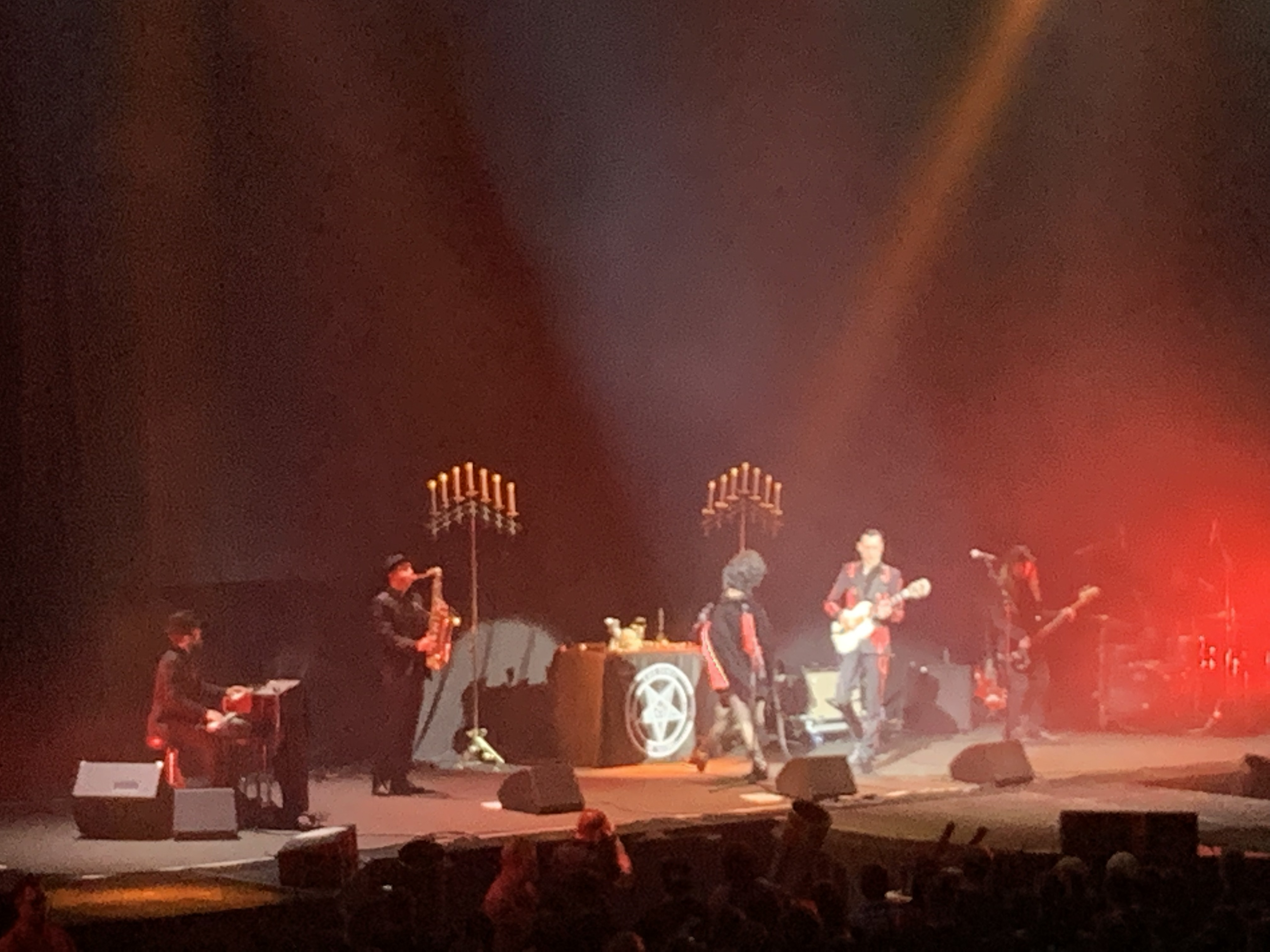
Twin Temple on stage, 2019

According to their own stage banter, the couple met during past lives when they were burned at the stake together in 1666. According to more recent and reliable sources, they previously played and toured together under the names Alexandra and the Starlight Band and Zachary James and the All Seeing Eyes.

Twin Temple produced and released their debut album, Twin Temple (Bring You Their Signature Sound….Satanic Doo Wop), in 2019. The album was recorded live and in mono, to get a more authentic sound resembling the music of the 1950s and 1960s. The whole album was recorded in a day and half, according to vocalist Alexandra James, and each song was recorded live in two or three takes, while the best takes ended up on the final album. Reviewers have compared Alexandra's vocal delivery that of Amy Winehouse and Ronnie Spector.

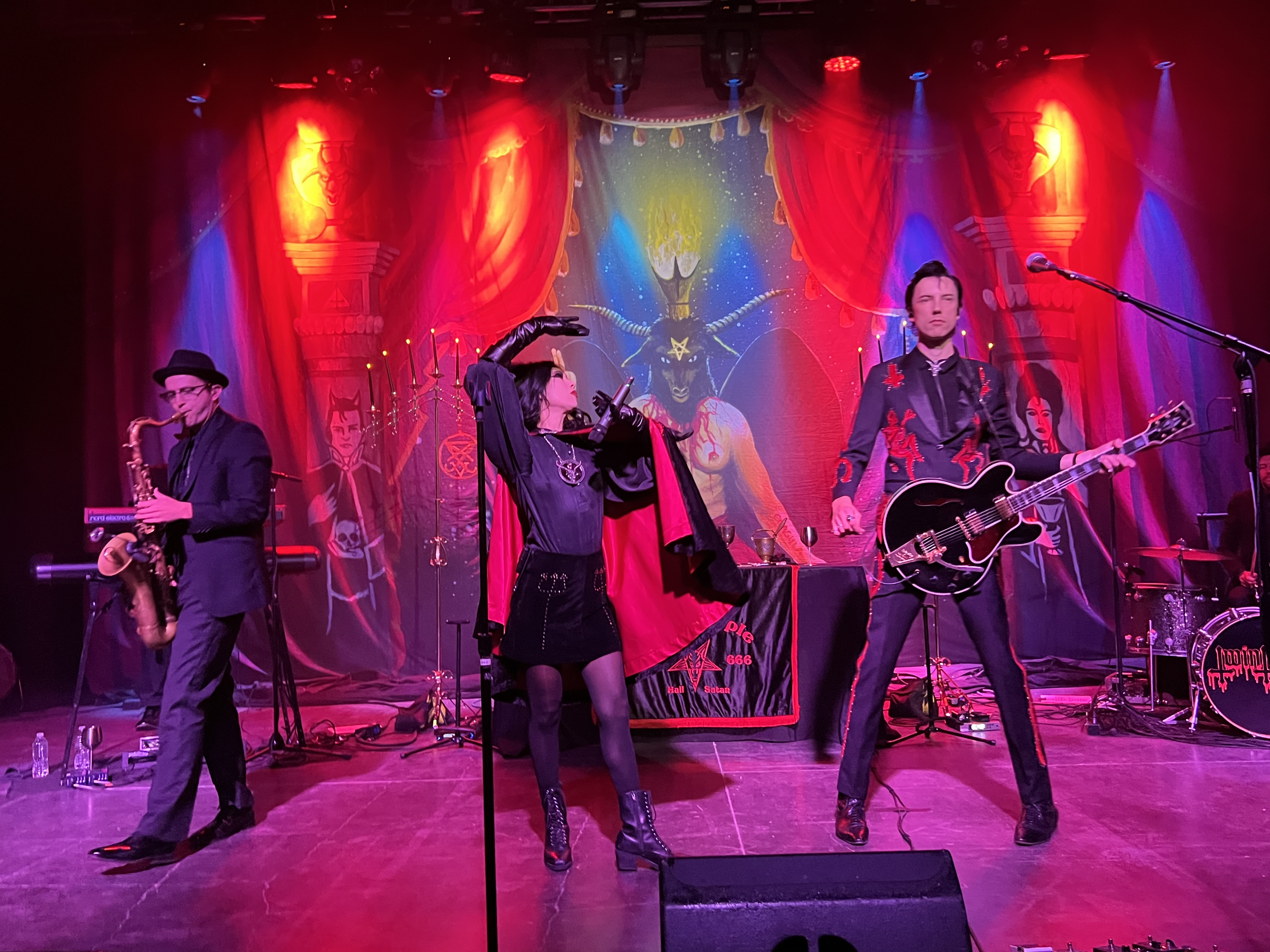
Twin Temple, 2022

Their first opening concert was on tour with the Swedish rock band Ghost, at the September 28, 2019 show at the Maverik Center in West Valley City, UT. Their live album Stripped from the Crypt was released in 2020. They released their single "Let's Have a Satanic Orgy" in 2021.

They gained further international recognition in 2022 when they opened for Ghost during their North American Imperatour alongside Volbeat. They also performed as an opening act for Ghost during their UK and European tour. Twin Temple embarked on their first headlining tour in October 2022.

They appeared on the Boulet Brothers' Halfway to Halloween TV Special in April 2023. Twin Temple supported Danzig in 2023, on the 35th anniversary tour of the band's debut album Danzig.

The far-right commentator Alex Jones publicly denounced Twin Temple via his channels, calling them the 'embodiment of pure evil.' They were subsequently doxxed and received backlash, from having a large number of bibles anonymously mailed to their house, to receiving death threats, and threats of violence at their shows.

They released God is Dead in 2024, drawing inspiration from Gold Star Studios record producer Phil Spector and session musician Hal Blaine: "...a lot of work went into making it sound like really old and degraded."

Due to their Satanic imagery, the band was dropped from a supporting act role with country musician Charley Crockett in July 2026. This cancelation generated significant press coverage and an invitation from Jack White to perform at the Hollywood Palladium.

Twin Temple made their late night television debut on The Daily Show, promoting Doomed Lovers on July 29.

== Musical style and lyrical themes ==
Their lyrics deal with themes like Satanism, sex, love, and also social issues such as individualism, feminism, and LGBT-rights.

According to vocalist Alexandra James, a lot of inspiration comes from her upbringing as a child of mixed race (White-Korean), and the racism she was exposed to growing up in America. Twin Temple says that the central message of their songs is inclusion.

== Band members ==
- Alexandra James (née Lee) – vocals
- Zachary James (né Rogenmoser) – guitar

== Discography ==
=== Albums ===
- Twin Temple (Bring You Their Signature Sound…. Satanic Doo-Wop), 2019
- Stripped from the Crypt: Twin Temple present a Collection of Live (And Undead) Recordings from Their Satanic Ritual Chamber..., 2020
- God Is Dead, 2023
- Doomed Lovers, 2026

=== EPs ===
- Twin Temple Summon the Sacred Whore... Babalon, 2021

=== Singles ===
- "Let's Hang Together", 2017
- "I Am a Witch", 2019
- "Satan's a Woman", 2019
- "Let's Have a Satanic Orgy", 2022
- "Burn Your Bible", 2023
- "Be a Slut", 2023
- "Doomed Lovers", 2026
