= Dazi culture =

Chinese social phenomenon

Dazi culture (Chinese: 搭子文化) is a social phenomenon that gained popularity in China during the 2020s. Dazi refers to social partners formed based on specific scenarios or short-term needs with low expectation. People match with dazi partners according to specific needs, such as dining dazi, drinking dazi, travel dazi, study dazi, fitness dazi, exhibition-visiting dazi, and fan meetup dazi, by utilizing the internet.

The core of dazi culture lies in its low commitment and instrumental orientation. Participants maintain clear boundaries in their relationships, avoiding deep emotional exchanges, and can dissolve the partnership at any time after the activity. The matching process often relies on social media, where platforms use algorithms to help users quickly find temporary partners with highly aligned interests and needs.

== Background ==
The emergence of dazi culture primarily responds to young people's disdain for inequality, emotional blackmail, and psychological manipulation in traditional relationships, as well as the loneliness experienced by individuals during urbanization and the pursuit of efficiency. In large cities, traditional social bonds such as family, neighborhood, and workplace connections weaken due to social atomization, making interpersonal relationships more fragmented. At the same time, young people seek "precision socializing" to reduce time costs, quickly matching with like-minded partners through dazi. Additionally, economic considerations have driven the growth of dazi culture, such as cost-sharing through group purchases and splitting expenses.

== Dazi culture and society ==
Dazi culture reflects and adapts to trends of social atomization, networked socialization, and decentralization. In an atomized society, it provides a lightweight social approach that meets immediate and precise social needs while avoiding the responsibilities and constraints of deeper relationships. The use of information technology shifts interpersonal connections from offline to online, facilitated by algorithms and interest-based communities. Decentralized socialization is evident in the transition from traditional strong ties to scenario-based relationships, where dazi partnerships form around specific needs rather than fixed social structures.

Dazi culture has positive social impacts, such as alleviating loneliness, expanding social circles, and lowering barriers to new experiences. However, it has also sparked debates, including concerns about the utilitarian nature of relationships, safety risks (especially in offline meetups), and the potential exacerbation of social fragmentation and emotional emptiness.

== See also ==
- Friendship recession
