= Bitlaha =

Bitlaha is a South Asian concept used as a social punishment for violating the norms of exogamy and endogamy.

The concept has been used by the Santals of India and the Satars of Nepal, who call themselves hod, meaning “human beings”. The hod in Nepal translate bitlaha as an outcast, disorder, polluted or unclean person. “It is a temporary state that affects both the village and it’s [sic] members…Bitlaha is contagious, affecting a bitlahas parents, guardians and whole village” (Skinner 207). Once a person is considered bitlaha they are no longer considered a member of their ethnic group and they are shunned and exiled from their community. The pancha, a male politician in Hod society, gives the bitlaha a chance to remove the derogatory name and reenter the ethnic group by paying a severe penalty.

Most bitlaha pay their penalty or their parents do so they will cease to be shunned from festivals, carnivals, celebrations and religious rituals. Those who decide to remain a bitlaha live in an isolated non-hod community for the rest of their lives. Even though bitlaha do not have to return to their villages, almost all of them do because of kinship networks and strong friendships within the village. Santals use bitlaha as a way to outcast those who have sexually misbehaved. Santals believe that exposing these culprits to corruption and public ridicule will make individuals stray from sexual misbehaving. “The tribe asserts itself as the supreme body regulating the conduct of its members”, which motivates individuals to behave properly and not shame their Hods.

== Bibliography ==
- The Hill of Flutes: Life, Love and Poetry in Tribal India: A Portrait of the Santals. W.G. Archer Review author[s]: C. von Furer-Haimendorf Man, New Series, Vol. 10, No. 2. (June 1975), pp. 335–336. JSTOR 2800531
- Skinner, Debra, Alfred Pach Iii, and Dorothy Holland. Selves in Time and Place. Lanham: Rowman & Littlefield, 1998. 207–214.
- Chaudhury, P.C. 1961. Bitlaha: A Santal Ritual. The Quarterly Journal of the Mythic Society 52(1): 1–5.
- Somers, George E. 1977. The Dynamics of Santal Traditions in a Peasant Society. New Delhi: Abhinava Publications
