= 2026 Trump political ads =

Political advertising in the United States

- Client: Department of Homeland Security
- Language: English
- Release date: September 2026
- Country: United States

In September 2026, the Trump administration launched a series of pro-Trump ads funded by public money on TV channels. The money was drawn from the Department of Homeland Security (DHS), and as of October 2 DHS was estimated to have spent at least $5.5 million to air three different TV ads featuring Trump in 2026, according to AdImpact.

The ads include videos previously aired as part of Trump's 2024 presidential campaign, and as of 2026 are being shown on Fox News Sunday, Saturday Night Live and several college and NFL football games. The White House characterizes the advertisements as "public service announcements" that are "reminding Americans to love their country and understand what makes it worth defending, at home, at our borders, and abroad." The advertisements end with the words "Paid for by the U.S. Government".

== Background ==
US federal law prohibits the government's usage of taxpayer funds for political content.

== History ==
According to Axios, Donald Trump enjoyed the videos produced by the White House digital team, which often include war-room-style social media posts, and had begun to post these to his Truth Social account. Trump subsequently decided to air the videos on television, and began to personally select which ads air ahead of the 2026 midterm elections. The advertisements are being produced inside the White House. According to sources, Trump personally instructed Office of Management and Budget director Russell Vought to pay for the ads with taxpayer dollars.

On September 19, one day before the ads began airing, OMB added $20 million to a line on the Department of Homeland Security Budget designated as "commemorative events." According to Trump's 2025 domestic spending bill, this line item is meant for "Line-of-Duty death memorials, Department or agency anniversaries, and commendation ceremonies." The following day, a $20 million contract was awarded to the media firm LMD Agency for a "national media campaign."

The first TV advertisement began airing on September 23, 2026.

On September 29, 2026, an administration official told Axios "This is just the beginning" in response to questions about the advertisements.

Democrats have requested an investigation from the General Accounting Office for possible violations of the Hatch Act, the Antideficiency Act and criminal statues regarding misuse of public funds. "Stealing taxpayer dollars to pay for Mr. Trump’s narcissistic ego trips is plainly illegal,”wrote Rep. Jaime Raskin and Rep. George Whitesides in a letter to the GAO.

On October 5, Trump announced on social media that because of the backlash, future ads would be paid for with funds from his super PAC, MAGA Inc, instead of taxpayer funds. Federal election laws prevent officeholders directing spending decisions for super PACs.

On October 11, U.S. District Judge Jennifer Rochon issued a preliminary injunction immediately ordering the Trump administration to halt airing all the pro-Trump ads. The injunction also barred the use of DHS funds to “develop, create, disseminate, place, distribute, publish, or air the challenged advertisements.”

== Reaction ==
The advertisements were criticized by ethics experts, including former George W. Bush White House ethics lawyer Richard Painter, who described the usage of public funds for the advertisements as an "abuse of power" and "an impeachable offense."

On September 28, 2026, Senate Majority Leader John Thune criticized the use of taxpayer funds for the advertisements, saying, "It's a great message, I like the message, but it shouldn't be paid for by taxpayer dollars."

In a September 29, 2026, letter to Secretary of Homeland Security Markwayne Mullin, senators Patty Murray and Chris Murphy wrote that the funds for the advertisements were provided from the One Big Beautiful Bill Act and were designated to be used for “Line-of-Duty death memorials, Department or agency anniversaries, and commendation ceremonies". According to the letter, the DHS has committed $20 million to the campaign.
