= Loneliness epidemic =

Global increase in social isolation

The loneliness epidemic is a term used to describe an ongoing trend of increasing loneliness and social isolation in multiple nations around the world. The rise of loneliness in society is shown to worsen health and life quality, making the rise of loneliness as a serious and endemic problem.

The statistical increase was found to have begun in the 2010s and was exacerbated by social distancing, stay-at-home orders, and deaths during the COVID-19 pandemic. Other factors credited for the increase include individualism, technology and social media, economic inequality, and lack of social support.

== History of the study of loneliness ==
The concept of a "loneliness epidemic" relating to rising rates of social isolation was first described in the 2000s. Robert D. Putnam's 2000 study Bowling Alone was an early instance of describing loneliness as an epidemic, arguing that decreased participation in civic life and community groups was weakening social bonds in the United States.

In 2010, a systematic review and meta analysis by Holt-Lunstad, Smith, and Layton, stated that the "modern way of life in industrialized countries" is greatly reducing the quality of social relationships, partly due to people no longer living in close proximity with their extended families. The review notes that from 1990 to 2010, the number of Americans reporting no close confidants had tripled.

Several studies on the issue were published shortly before the COVID-19 pandemic by academics such as Claude S. Fischer and Eric Klinenberg. While the issue loneliness was not universally described as an "epidemic," the studies concluded that loneliness was a serious issue with health implications for millions of people.

In early 2021, shortly after the onset of the COVID-19 pandemic, Harvard's Making Caring Common Project released its first Loneliness in America report, which linked the issue to pandemic-driven isolation and identified significant loneliness, particularly among young adults and parents of young children. That same year, Richard Weissbourd's follow-up study found that around 36% of American adults reported chronic loneliness, a trend mirrored across several countries where lockdowns and social distancing intensified social isolation.

In Europe, a comparative overview of the prevalence and determinants of loneliness and social isolation in the pre-COVID period was conducted by the Joint Research Centre of the European Commission. The findings indicated that 8.6% of the adult population in Europe experience frequent loneliness and 20.8% experience social isolation, with eastern Europe recording the highest prevalence of both phenomena.

In Australia, the annual national Household, Income and Labour Dynamics in Australia (HILDA) Survey has reported a steady 8% rise in agreement with the statement "I often feel very lonely" between 2009 and 2021, responses indicating "strongly agree" rose steadily by over 20% in that same time period. This is a reversal of the trend seen from the start of the survey in 2001 until 2009, where these figures had both been steadily decreasing.

Together, these studies have spurred more recent efforts to examine and address loneliness as a public health priority, in the U.S. and globally.

== Causes of loneliness ==
Some authors identified individualism as a root cause of loneliness in Western societies, particularly in the U.S. Scholars like Robert N. Bellah, in Habits of the Heart, argue that American individualism weakens communal bonds, leading to social isolation and loneliness. Similarly, Wendell Berry's essays emphasize how modern, profit-oriented social structures undermine community connection.

Technology use is another significant factor. According to Capita, an American think tank that specializes in the study of loneliness, the overuse of digital and social media, especially among young people, often reduces real-life interactions and deepens feelings of isolation. In another essay titled The Good, The Bad & The Lonely, Capita highlighted that Gen Z experiences heightened loneliness, as they report lower engagement in community activities. Richard Weissbourd's research supports these findings, linking social media and screen time to disconnection among U.S. youth.

Economic challenges were also found to compound these issues. Low-wage workers and individuals in economically distressed areas experience higher levels of loneliness due to limited social mobility and access to community resources. Chris Arnade's book Dignity describes how economic inequality isolates individuals, especially in lower-income communities. The reported rate of feeling lonely is negatively correlated with income, both across and within countries.

Meanwhile, a 2021 survey on the impact of parenthood on loneliness indicates that although parents report slightly more social support than non-parents, single-person households and low social support environments face increased isolation risks. Timothy P. Carney's Family Unfriendly highlights policies that fail to support stay-at-home parents, contributing to isolation and mental health challenges.

== Global responses to the loneliness epidemic ==
Since the 2010s, large-scale initiatives have been launched in countries including the United States, Australia and the United Kingdom.

In November 2023, the World Health Organization declared loneliness a "global public health concern" and launched an international commission to study the problem.

=== United States ===
In the U.S., the loneliness epidemic has increasingly become a topic of public debate, particularly since May 2023, when the U.S. Surgeon General Vivek Murthy published a United States Department of Health and Human Services advisory on the impact of the epidemic of loneliness and isolation. The report outlined the health risks of loneliness, including heart disease, stroke, and dementia, and likened the dangers of loneliness to other public health threats such as smoking and obesity.

Following Murthy's advisory, bipartisan legislative proposals emerged, notably the National Strategy for Social Connection Act led by Senator Chris Murphy. This proposed act aims to establish a federal office focused on addressing loneliness and promoting social connectedness through community and public health initiatives.

The conversation around loneliness has since broadened to include state-level responses and greater public awareness, underscoring the need for systemic efforts to counteract this public health challenge.

In September 2024, the New York Times reported that metrics indicative of loneliness were especially common among Americans who lack a college degree.

== See also ==
- Are You Dead?
- Friendship recession
- Friendslop

== Bibliography ==
- Bellah, R. N. (1985). Habits of the Heart: Individualism and Commitment in American Life. University of California Press. ISBN 9780520053885.
- Putnam, R. D. (2001). Bowling Alone: The Collapse and Revival of American Community. Simon & Schuster. ISBN 9780743203043.
- Holt-Lunstad, J.; Smith, T. B.; Layton, J. B. (2010). "Social Relationships and Mortality Risk: A Meta-analytic Review". PLOS Medicine.
- Berry, W. (2010). The Art of the Commonplace: The Agrarian Essays of Wendell Berry. ReadHowYouWant. ISBN 9781458780645.
- DiJulio, B.; Hamel, L.; Muñana, C.; Brodie, M. (2018). "Loneliness and Social Isolation in the United States, the United Kingdom, and Japan: An International Survey". KFF.
- Arnade, C. (2019). Dignity: Seeking Respect in Back Row America. Penguin Publishing Group. ISBN 9780525534730.
- Baarck, J; D'hombres, B; Tintori, G (2021). "Loneliness in Europe before and during the COVID-19 pandemic". Joint Research Centre of the European Commission.
- Capita. (2022). Social Connection Report: The Ties That Bind and Nurture. Capita.org.
- Surkalim, D. L.; Luo, M.; Eres, R.; Gebel, K.; van Buskirk, J.; Bauman, A; et al. (2022). "The prevalence of loneliness across 113 countries: systematic review and meta-analysis". The BMJ.
- Carney, T. P. (2024). Family Unfriendly: How Our Culture Made Raising Kids Much Harder Than It Needs to Be. HarperCollins. ISBN 9780063236479.
