= Friendship recession =

Decline in the number of friends people have

The friendship recession is a decline in the number of friends people have in Canada and the United States. The decline first began in the late 20th century. This phenomenon is theorized to have a wide range of impacts on mental and physical health.

== Statistics ==
=== United States ===
Surveys show that the number of close friends people have on average has decreased. Those who state they have 10+ close friends, excluding family members, was 33% in 1990, but has now decreased to 13% in 2021.

=== Canada ===
Canadian seniors can often feel more lonely than the general population. Ageism, the community environment and dementia can put them more at risk.

== Impacts ==
Social isolation creates a higher likelihood of becoming depressed or anxious, or committing suicide. One study in Germany showed that having several friends is correlated with fewer worries about the economy and higher life satisfaction.

Those without friends are more likely to feel lonely. Chronic loneliness is linked to poorer sleep and increases the odds of cardiovascular disease as much as smoking 15 cigarettes per day would. This may be because people who are chronically lonely develop long-term "fight-or-flight" stress signaling, which negatively affects immune system functioning, leading to less immunity and more inflammation.

Finally, in a study evaluating 99 countries, it was found that those who prioritize friendships tend to be happier, especially if they are women, older people, less educated or people of an individualistic culture. Friendships becoming less prioritized in North America may mean that the friendship recession is causing a decrease in happiness for the average citizen.

== Potential causes ==
Some cite bad urban planning practices as a cause of the friendship recession because it has led to the destruction of inexpensive third places to meet new people or to socialize with people one already knows. Poor city design has also led to the proliferation of car dependency, suburbia and urban sprawl, which make meeting with existing friends more time-consuming, expensive and difficult while also reducing the likelihood that one will talk to strangers.

Some cite economic factors. Because the value of wages have stagnated since the late 20th century, precarious work is on the rise and people receive fewer job benefits, people may often choose to focus on work or school more instead of investing time in friendships.

Culture may also play a role in creating destructive expectations, for example, the idea that friendships need to be forever, or that occasional conflicts are not ok, or that there is an ideal form of friendship, or that friends should simply know what their friend needs without being told are all false and can harm existing friendships.

Some believe the rise of workism, the belief that work is the most important aspect of life and the source of identity and meaning, is a factor. Workism, on top of creating of culture of competition, stress and burnout, can make people prioritize their careers over their personal relationships and hobbies.

Many believe increased technology and social media usage is a culprit as there are links between heavy social media and internet use and fewer friends and time spent with others. It is thought that time spent interacting with others online or passively consuming content is of lower quality than time spent with others in person.

Finally, some believe the COVID-19 pandemic may have affected friendships negatively. Due to lockdowns, social distancing, and health risks, people were forced to limit their physical contact with their friends and could have lost touch. However, data on the subject is limited and mixed as the pandemic affected different groups of people differently. Some people may have strengthened their friendships by sharing their vulnerabilities or by cutting out peripheral and superficial relationships.

== Actions to combat the friendship recession ==
One study found that believing that friendship happens based on luck was related to more loneliness five years later, whereas believing that friendship takes effort was related to less loneliness.

== See also ==
- Third places
- Hikkikomori
- Loneliness epidemic
- Dazi Culture
