= Are You Dead? =

Chinese mobile application

Stable release
- iOS/iPadOS: 1.1 / 15 December 2025; 9 months ago
- Operating system: iOS 13 and later; iPadOS 13
- Available in: Simplified Chinese, Traditional Chinese, English
- Website: demumu.co

Are You Dead? (Chinese: 死了么; pinyin: Sǐleme), also known by its English name Demumu, is a Chinese application designed for young people living alone. It requires setting up one emergency contact and sends automatic notifications if the user has not checked in via the app for consecutive days.

The app was released on the App Store on 10 June 2025. In early January 2026, the application gained popularity due to its name and the issue of safety for people living alone, and ranked high on the list of paid applications in the Chinese region of the Apple App Store before being removed. The app's rise in popularity sparked discussions about taboos about death in China.

== History ==
Are You Dead? was founded and operated independently by three people born in the 1990s, and developed in a way that involved remote collaboration in their spare time. According to the New Yellow River report, Guo, the product manager, said that the application was designed for young people and that the inspiration came from the discussion of netizens on social platforms about "an app that everyone must have and will definitely download" that he observed two or three years ago. The name was also "not their original creation". After realizing its potential demand and social significance, the team successfully registered the name and completed the product development in about a month. Regarding the development entity, the New Yellow River cited information from the Apple App Store that the application was developed by Yuejing (Zhengzhou) Technology Service Co., Ltd. According to Tianyancha information, the company was established in March 2025 with a registered capital of 100,000 yuan.

=== Rise in popularity ===
The app has been generating buzz on social media since 9 January 2026, due to its name and the topic of safety for people living alone. Around 10 January, it topped the Apple paid app chart. As of 10:00 a.m. on January 11, it ranked first in the App Store paid app chart. It also ranked highly in the utility app chart; it ranked first or second in the paid utility app charts in the United States, Singapore and Hong Kong, and first or fourth in Australia and Spain. The app was subsequently removed from the Apple App Store in China.

In terms of functionality and usage, First Financial praised the product for its "simple interface and single function," but pointed out that the interface lacks a display of consecutive check-in days, and there is also the possibility that users may forget to check in, leading to the mistaken issuance of reminders. In addition, since the application mainly relies on email reminders and lacks SMS or telephone notifications, it does not conform to Chinese social habits; the untimely notifications also make the application more like a "death notification" tool, losing its early warning significance for emergency rescue. Hu Xijin, former editor-in-chief of the Global Times, commented on the application on Weibo that it is "really good and can help many lonely elderly people." The Beijing News Quick Review pointed out that the role of technical tools is limited and needs to be connected with real support such as community patrols and liaison mechanisms. Due to the price increase, there have also been questions about the motivation for the price increase.

The app's rise in popularity sparked discussions about taboos about death in China. Regarding the popularity of the application, both Southern Metropolis Daily and The Beijing News commented that it reflects the public issue of the risks of living alone and reflects the general anxiety of the living alone group about dying alone. Shangguan News further pointed out that although such technology products provide a certain "low-cost sense of security", their "cold notifications" may not only cause false alarms, but also highlight the embarrassing reality that "there is no one to fill in the emergency contact". It also emphasized that algorithms or applications cannot bring true happiness and called on society to reconstruct a support network full of humanistic care while relying on technology.

The name of the application has also sparked controversy. Most netizens believe that the name "Are You Dead?" is unlucky and makes it awkward to share the application. They suggest changing it to a milder name such as "Are You Alive?". Hu Xijin also said that the name change could "give the elderly who use it more psychological comfort" and "believe that the application will become more popular after the name change". Some people also believe that this straightforward name just points out the real dilemma faced by people living alone and has a special meaning. BBC News commented that the name "Are You Dead" is playing a word game with Ele.me (Chinese: 饿了么; pinyin: Èleme) and the pronunciation is also similar. Legal professionals believe that its name is highly similar to Ele.me and may cause confusion. They also raised the possibility of trademark infringement and unfair competition. However, the developers said that the application is developed for young people and death is not a sensitive topic. They will "consider launching a new application that is more suitable for middle-aged and elderly people". They have not yet received any name change requests from relevant departments. On the evening of 13 January 2026, the Are You Dead? team announced that it would change its name to the English brand name Demumu in the upcoming new version.

On 11 January, the development team also issued a statement through its official Weibo account, stating that it would study the renaming suggestion and plan to enrich the SMS reminder function, consider adding the message function and explore the direction of age-friendly products; it also stated that it would launch an 8 yuan paid plan to cover the costs of SMS, servers, etc., and welcomed investors to discuss cooperation. In terms of financing and valuation, it plans to sell 10% of the company's shares for 1 million yuan and proposed a valuation of 10 million yuan. On the evening of January 15, the application was removed from the app store in mainland China.

== Functions ==
The application does not require users to enter phone numbers or other information to register. After filling in their name and setting an emergency contact, users can click the sign-in button every day. If they fail to sign in for two consecutive days, the system will send an email reminder to the emergency contact the next day. In addition, users can also bind a smart bracelet to monitor physiological signs, pre-designate a hearse driver and funeral music, and trigger the "one-click body collection" function when no pulse is detected. The application was initially available for free download, but a one yuan paid download option was introduced at the end of 2025. In January 2026, the application team issued a statement saying that an 8 yuan paid option would be launched based on the costs of SMS, servers, etc.
