= Neighborhood watch (disambiguation) =

Neighborhood watch is a citizens' organization devoted to crime prevention within a neighborhood.

Neighborhood or Neighbourhood watch may also refer to:

== Crime prevention ==
- National Neighborhood Watch Program, a United States neighborhood watch program run under Citizen Corps
- National Night Out, a community-police awareness-raising event in the United States
- Neighbourhood Watch (United Kingdom), a community crime-prevention partnership in the United Kingdom

== Music ==
- Neighborhood Watch (album), a 2004 album by Dilated Peoples, or the title track
- "Neighbourhood Watch", a 2018 song by English rapper Skepta

== Literature and plays ==
- "Neighbourhood Watch" (short story), a 1987 short story by Greg Egan
- Neighbourhood Watch (Ayckbourn play), a 2011 play written by Alan Ayckbourn
- Neighbourhood Watch (Katz play), a 2011 play written by Lally Katz

== Film and television ==
- Neighborhood Watch (film), a 2025 film directed by Duncan Skiles
- Neighborhood Watch, a film starring Terry Becker
- The Watch (2012 film) (previously titled Neighborhood Watch), a film directed by Akiva Schaffer
- The Neighborhood Watch, a 2014 American short film by Christopher Langer
- Dame Edna's Neighbourhood Watch, a 1992 comedy game show
- "Neighbourhood Watch" (Ever Decreasing Circles), a 1987 television episode
- "Neighborhood Watch" (Law & Order: Criminal Intent), a 2008 television episode
- "Neighborhood Watch" (White Collar), a 2012 television episode

== See also ==
- Neighbourhood Watched, a British reality television programme
