= Bloody Waters =

Blood Waters may refer to:

- Bloody Waters, a 1996 novel by Carolina Garcia-Aguilera
- "Bloody Waters", a 2018 song by Ab-Soul, Anderson Paak, and James Blake from the Black Panther soundtrack
- "Bloody Water", a 2021 song by H.E.R. and Thundercat from the album Back of My Mind

== See also ==
- Blood and Water (disambiguation)
- Blood in the Water (disambiguation)
