= Five Bullets =

2026 book by Elliot Williams

- Author: Elliot Williams
- Genre: Nonfiction
- Publisher: Penguin Press
- Publication date: January 20, 2026
- Publication place: United States
- ISBN: 978-0-593-83370-4

Five Bullets: The Story of Bernie Goetz, New York's Explosive '80s, and the Subway Vigilante Trial that Divided the Nation is a 2026 nonfiction book by American legal analyst Elliot Williams. The book revisits the 1984 New York City Subway shooting, a significant moment in the history of New York City in which a middle-aged white man, Bernie Goetz, shot four black teenagers when one asked for five dollars on the subway. (Note: Sources disagree on whether the request was meant to be threatening or just annoying.) Williams covers the incident through the lens of a legal analysis.

Nearly simultaneously to the release of Five Bullets, another imprint of the same publishing house released Fear and Fury, a book by historian Heather Ann Thompson that covers the shooting with more emphasis on a humanizing portrayal of the teens. Reviews of Five Bullets were generally positive.

== Background and release ==
The Bernie Goetz case was a highly discussed moment in the history of New York City, one emblematic of rising crime in the city and public panic in response to it, especially as it pertained to the city's subway system. As Adam Gopnik put it in a New Yorker review of the book: "It's hard to explain to people who weren't there how the subway managed to feel more dangerous than it does now even as violations of the normal order felt less menacing, because they were part of the normal order." The shooting was heavily covered in the tabloids and debated by the public, with people viewing him either as a vigilante acting in self-defense or as a racist looking for an excuse to shoot someone. Goetz and the shooting also appeared regularly in pop culture; among other things, Goetz was mentioned in Billy Joel's hit song "We Didn't Start the Fire".

In December 1984, Bernie Goetz, a fairly solitary self-employed 37-year-old white man, was traveling on the subway with a revolver; he had applied for a concealed-carry permit, but was denied. Four black teenage boys – Barry Allen, Darrell Cabey, Troy Canty, and James Ramseur – approached Goetz; Canty asked Goetz to give him five dollars. Believing that he was about to be mugged, Goetz pulled his gun and shot all four, wounding and stunning them. Thinking he had not shot Cabey, Goetz then quipped, "You don't look so bad. Here's another", shooting Cabey again and permanently disabling him. Goetz fled to the northeast, turning himself in at a New Hampshire police station. After a protracted legal battle, Goetz was acquitted of all but a weapons charge in criminal court, but was found liable in civil court after Cabey sued him.

Elliot Williams, a Brooklyn native, recounts seeing the shooting and its aftermath playing out all over the news and even in hip-hop songs as a child. He later chose to write a book on the shooting to connect it to contemporary discourse about the safety of cities and vigilantism, and to illustrate how many contemporary figures started or furthered their career through the shooting, such as Al Sharpton and Rupert Murdoch.

A year into writing Five Bullets, Williams found out that historian Heather Ann Thompson was writing Fear and Fury, which also covers the 1984 shooting. Both books, under different imprints of Penguin Random House, were initially scheduled to be released on the same day; Five Bullets was later moved up to January 20, and Fear and Fury to January 27, 2026. While both books cover the shooting in detail and give all sides of the debate reasonably due weight, Williams' book goes into much more depth on the legal proceedings and gives a more humanizing portrayal of Goetz; Thompson's book focuses more on giving a humanizing portrayal to the four teenagers and analyzes Goetz's actions through the lens of white rage. Where Williams' book closes with an interview of Goetz, Thompson did not try to reach him at all, instead concluding her book with a picture of Cabey and his mother.

== Synopsis ==
Five Bullets describes the socioeconomic conditions of New York City that set the tone for the shooting and the subsequent debates in the public, the press, and the courts. It goes into the backstories of all five of the main people involved, giving significant attention to each. It then delves into a detailed account of the shooting and the trial, drawn from archival sources and interviews. Throughout that account, Williams gives significant amounts of attention to the press's coverage of the event, illustrating the role of the tabloids and up-and-coming public figures in making the case a staple of the discourse and portraying Goetz as the "subway vigilante". The book covers the back-and-forth of the criminal and civil trials, illustrating key moments in the criminal trial that may have helped the jury decide to acquit Goetz.

In the book's conclusion, Williams compares Goetz to more contemporary vigilantes like Kyle Rittenhouse and Daniel Penny, remarking that "we are still afraid, still haunted by America’s racist past (and present and future), and still very quick to kill strangers." While he refers to the jury's verdict in Goetz's criminal case as "supportable and sound", he draws a distinction between that and the morality of the case, arguing that the public should "ensure that our laws and systems best serve an evolving society". Five Bullets concludes with Williams describing an interview he conducted with Goetz by phone. Goetz fully defended his actions in the shooting, sidetracking at points into discussions about race, cannabis, and politics. Portions of that conversation were posted on Williams's social media.

== Reception ==
Reception for Five Bullets was generally positive. Publishers Weekly called it "thorough" and "sharp"; Kirkus Reviews called it "lively and haunting". Jennifer Szalai of The New York Times said it was "adequate" but that it "suffers by inevitable comparison" to Fear and Fury.
