= Blood Is Thicker than Water =

Blood Is Thicker than Water may refer to:

- Blood is thicker than water, an English proverb

== Film and television ==
- Bra Boys: Blood Is Thicker than Water, a 2007 Australian documentary
- "Blood Is Thicker than Water", a 2014 episode of Casualty
- "Blood Is Thicker than Water", a 2011 episode of Neighbourhood Watched

== Music ==
- Blood Is Thicker than Water, a Huangmei opera in which Han Zaifen performed
- Blood Is Thicker than Water, a 1998 split album by Strength and Stinger
- "Blood Is Thicker than Water", a song by Black Label Society from Shot to Hell
- "Blood Is Thicker than Water", a 1983 song by Choirboys from Choirboys
- "Blood Is Thicker than Water", a 1974 song by William DeVaughn from Be Thankful for What You Got
- "Blood Is Thicker than Water", a 2014 song by Ill Niño from Till Death, La Familia
- "Blood Is Thicker than Water", a 1994 song by Impaled Nazarene from Suomi Finland Perkele
- "Blood Is Thicker than Water", a 2014 song by the McClymonts from Here's to You & I
- "Blood Is Thicker than Water", a 1992 song by Thelonious Monster from Beautiful Mess
- "Blood Is Thicker Than Water", a 2006 song by Pitbull featuring Redd Eyezz from El Mariel

== See also ==
- Thicker than Water (disambiguation)
- Thicker Than Blood (disambiguation)
- Blood and Water (disambiguation)
