= Fear and Fury =

2026 book by Heather Ann Thompson

- Author: Heather Ann Thompson
- Genre: Nonfiction
- Publisher: Pantheon Books
- Publication date: January 27, 2026
- Publication place: United States
- ISBN: 978-0-593-70209-3

Fear and Fury: The Reagan Eighties, the Bernie Goetz Shootings, and the Rebirth of White Rage is a nonfiction book by Heather Ann Thompson. The book revisits the 1984 New York City Subway shooting, a significant moment in the history of New York City in which a middle-aged white man, Bernie Goetz, shot four black teenagers when one asked for five dollars on the subway. (Note: Sources disagree on whether the request was meant to be threatening or just annoying.) Thompson covers the incident through an analysis of white rage, connecting it to Reagan-era politics and present-day attitudes, taking care to emphasize the humanity of the four teens.

Nearly simultaneously to the release of Fear and Fury, another imprint of the same publishing house released Five Bullets, a book by legal analyst Elliot Williams that covers the shooting from a more legal perspective. Reviews of Fear and Fury were generally positive.

== Background and release ==
The Bernie Goetz case was a highly discussed moment in the history of New York City, one emblematic of rising crime in the city and public panic in response to it, especially as it pertained to the city's subway system. As Adam Gopnik put it in a New Yorker review of the book: "It's hard to explain to people who weren't there how the subway managed to feel more dangerous than it does now even as violations of the normal order felt less menacing, because they were part of the normal order." The shooting was heavily covered in the tabloids and debated by the public, with people viewing him either as a vigilante acting in self-defense or as a racist looking for an excuse to shoot someone. Goetz and the shooting also appeared regularly in pop culture; among other things, Goetz was mentioned in Billy Joel's hit song "We Didn't Start the Fire".

In December 1984, Bernie Goetz, a fairly solitary self-employed 37-year-old white man, was traveling on the subway with a revolver; he had applied for a concealed-carry permit, but was denied. Four black teenage boys – Barry Allen, Darrell Cabey, Troy Canty, and James Ramseur – approached Goetz; Canty asked Goetz to give him five dollars. Believing that he was about to be mugged, Goetz pulled his gun and shot all four, wounding and stunning them. Thinking he had not shot Cabey, Goetz then quipped, "You don't look so bad. Here's another", shooting Cabey again and permanently disabling him. Goetz fled to the northeast, turning himself in at a New Hampshire police station. After a protracted legal battle, Goetz was acquitted of all but a weapons charge in criminal court, but was found liable in civil court after Cabey sued him.

Heather Ann Thompson, an American historian who won a Pulitzer Prize for History for her 2017 book about the Attica Prison riot, was next planning to write about the 1985 MOVE bombing; she decided to write about Goetz after experiencing the first Trump administration, the results of the 2020 presidential election, and the subsequent January 6 attack on the United States Capitol. Rather than interview Goetz, Thompson gathered information for her book primarily in the style of an archival researcher, aiming to tell the story with a focus on the black teenagers and the challenges they experienced in that time. At the same time, CNN legal analyst Elliot Williams was writing Five Bullets, which also covers the 1984 shooting but focuses more on the legal angle and portrays Goetz as a somewhat more complex character. Both books, under different imprints of Penguin Random House, were initially and coincidentally scheduled to be released on the same day; Five Bullets was then moved up to January 20 and Fear and Fury to January 27, 2026.

== Synopsis ==
Fear and Fury starts with Thompson's overview of the situation in New York City and how it came about; while she acknowledges the full extent of the rise in crime, she attributes it to an economic downturn brought on by Reaganomics and associated conservative policies that attacked significant liberal programs, including the New Deal, the Great Society, and the achievements of the civil rights movement. These new policies, Thompson writes, were part of and created the conservative white rage against the recent economic upticks for black people and Latinos in the city. The South Bronx in particular, the area the teens were from, had a heavily negative reputation for crime and poverty in that national consciousness at that time.

Thompson then recounts the events of the shooting; she starts with the four teens' plan to journey from the South Bronx to an amusement arcade, open the machines with screwdrivers, and take the money stored inside. She writes that at the time, the four black teenage boys would have been immediately stereotyped as dangerous by onlookers – despite the fact that all four of them were skinny and not very tall – but she takes care to portray them as complex and human, going into detail on each of their stories. In order to not look suspicious in the arcade, Thompson says, the teens planned to panhandle for money. Goetz got on the train, choosing to sit very close to the teens; Canty then asked Goetz, "how about giving us five bucks?". Goetz asked Canty to repeat the request, which he did. Goetz then got up slowly, feinting a reach into his jacket as if to actually give the money; then he quickly turned to face them, pulled out his gun, and shot Canty in the chest. He then shot a fleeing Allen in the back, then Ramseur, then Cabey. Seeing Cabey prone but not visibly bleeding, Goetz said, "you don't look so bad. Here's another.", shooting Cabey at point-blank range.

Goetz returned to his apartment; the tabloids, not even knowing his identity yet, immediately lionized him and villainized the four teens. Thompson recounts that, upon reading the tabloid stories, two city judges issued warrants for the four teens for petty crimes while they were still recovering from their serious injuries. She goes into detail about the harrowing life of the teens post-shooting, quoting from the hate mail received by their families and comparing it to other 1980s cases of anti-black violence. She talks about Cabey, who suffered serious brain and heart injury, having been permanently paralyzed from the waist down and put into a coma; he was unable to testify at Goetz's trial. The other three did eventually recover.

More than a week after the shooting, Thompson writes, Goetz turned himself in at a police station in Concord, New Hampshire; he was interrogated by New York City police. There, he says he was not threatened, and that he had looked to kill someone when he had gotten on the train; he says he did not shoot for racist reasons, but repeatedly argued that the city should not have black or brown people, describing the former with an offensive slur. The jury saw all of these statements and more at his criminal trial; the defense's strategy was to discredit Goetz's statements and portray him as a victim of trauma from a previous mugging who acted on instinct. The jury ultimately accepted the defense's arguments, acquitting Goetz on all but the weapons charge.

Thompson's book closes with an analysis of white rage. She argues that the force that drove Goetz to fire was echoed in the killing of Jordan Neely and has caused democratic backsliding in the United States decades later; and that with the conservative shift in the judiciary, Goetz's case likely would have played out the same way today. The final page of the book is a picture of Cabey, in his wheelchair, with his mother.

== Reaction ==
Walton Muyumba, writing in The Boston Globe, praises Thompson's portrayal of 1980s New York City and her connection of the attitudes of that time and place to 2020s America; however, he argues that white rage is a much older phenomenon than Reaganomics, older than the United States itself. Jennifer Szalai, writing in The New York Times, writes that "Thompson's book is vibrant, powerful and moving; Williams's, while adequate, suffers by inevitable comparison." Her conclusion from the book, particularly the closing photo, is that love should not be forgotten as a counter force amongst the "fear and fury" in the contemporary political climate.
