= Thicker Than Blood =

Thicker Than Blood may refer to:

- "Thicker Than Blood" (song), a 2002 single by Garth Brooks
- Thicker Than Blood (film), a 1998 film starring Mickey Rourke
- Thicker Than Blood: The Larry McLinden Story, a 1994 film starring Peter Strauss
- "Thicker Than Blood" (Magnum, P.I.), a 1981 television episode

== See also ==
- Blood Is Thicker than Water (disambiguation)
- Thicker than Water (disambiguation)
