= Thicker than Water =

Thicker than Water may refer to:

- Blood is thicker than water, a proverb

== Film ==
- Thicker than Water (1935 film), a Laurel and Hardy film
- Thicker than Water (1993 film), a television film
- Thicker than Water (1999 film), a drama starring several American rappers
- Thicker than Water (2000 film), a surf film by Jack Johnson and Chris Malloy
- Thicker than Water (2005 film), a television film starring Melissa Gilbert and Lindsay Wagner
- Thicker than Water (2006 film) or Blóðbönd, an Icelandic film
- Thicker than Water (2018 film), an Australian drama starring Pete Murray

== Literature ==
- Thicker Than Water (novel), a 2003 crime novel by Lindy Cameron
- Thicker Than Water, a 2009 novel by Mike Carey
- Thicker Than Water, a 1992 novel by Kathryn Harrison
- Thicker Than Water, a 1981 novel by Ralph McInerny
- Thicker Than Water, a 2023 memoir by Kerry Washington

== Music ==
- Thicker than Water (album), a 1997 album by H2O
- Thicker than Water (soundtrack), a soundtrack album from the 1999 film
- Thicker than Water, a soundtrack album from the 2000 film
- "(Love Is) Thicker Than Water", a 1977 song by Andy Gibb

== Television ==
- Thicker Than Water (1968 TV series), a British TV series that debuted in 1968
- Thicker than Water (1973 TV series), an American sitcom based on the British sitcom Nearest and Dearest
- Thicker Than Water (2013 TV series), an American reality series
- Thicker Than Water (2014 TV series), a Swedish drama about three siblings who inherit a guesthouse
- "Thicker than Water" (Charlie Jade), a 2005 episode
- "Thicker Than Water" (The Detectives), a 1995 episode
- "Thicker than Water" (Merseybeat), a 2001 episode
- "Thicker than Water" (Only Fools and Horses), a 1983 episode
- "Thicker Than Water" (Under the Dome), a 2013 episode
- "Thicker Than Water" (Van der Valk), a 1972 episode
- Thicker than Water (audio drama), a 2005 audio drama based on Doctor Who
- "Thicker Than Water", an episode of Keeping Up with the Kardashians

== See also ==
- Blood Is Thicker than Water (disambiguation)
- Thicker Than Blood (disambiguation)
