= 1984 New York City Subway shooting =

Shooting of four Black teenagers by Bernhard Goetz

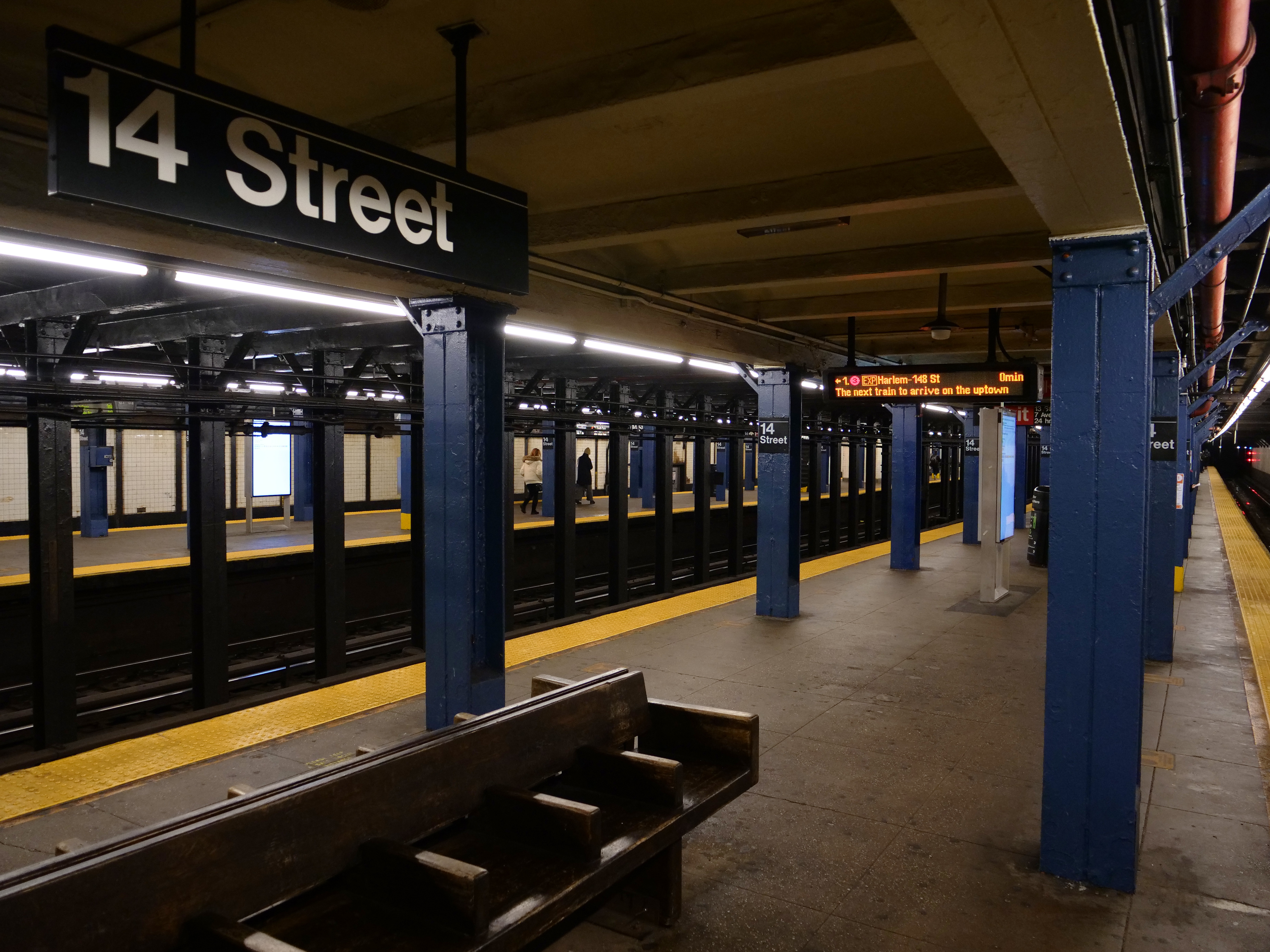
- The 14th Street station in Manhattan, where Goetz boarded the subway before the shooting
- Location: New York City, New York, U.S.
- Date: December 22, 1984; 41 years ago
- Attack type: Mass shooting
- Weapon: Smith & Wesson Model 38
- Injuries: 4
- Motive: Disputed: Vigilantism (prosecution's claim); Anti-black racism (plaintiff's claim in civil case); Self-defense
- Charges: Attempted second-degree murder (4 counts); First-degree assault (4 counts); Reckless endangerment; Criminal possession of a weapon (4 counts) (Note: Second-degree criminal possession of a weapon; Third-degree criminal possession of a weapon; Fourth-degree criminal possession of a weapon (2 counts))
- Verdict: Guilty of third-degree criminal possession of a weapon; Not guilty on remaining charges
- Convictions: Third-degree criminal possession of a weapon
- Sentence: 1 year in jail (released after 8 1/2 months)
- Convicted: Bernhard Hugo Goetz
- Litigation: Goetz ordered to pay $43 million ($88 million in 2025) to Cabey in civil trial for reckless and deliberate infliction of emotional distress

On December 22, 1984, Bernhard Goetz (Note: Sometimes spelled "Bernard Goetz".) (/ɡɛts/) shot four black teenagers on a New York City Subway train in Manhattan. All four victims survived, though one, Darrell Cabey, was paralyzed and suffered brain damage as a result of his injuries. Goetz fled to Bennington, Vermont, before surrendering to police nine days after the shooting. He was charged with attempted murder, assault, reckless endangerment, and several firearms offenses. Goetz claimed self-defense at trial, alleging that the teenagers had attempted to rob him. The jury subsequently found Goetz guilty of one count of carrying an unlicensed firearm and acquitted him of the remaining charges. For the firearm offense, he served eight months of a one-year sentence. In 1996, Cabey obtained a $43 million civil judgment (equivalent to $88 million in 2025) against Goetz after a civil jury ruled Goetz liable.

The incident sparked a nationwide debate on crime in major U.S. cities, the legal limits of self-defense, and the extent to which the citizenry could rely on the police to secure their safety. Questions of what impact race—and racism—had on Goetz, the public reaction, and the criminal verdict were hotly contested. Goetz was dubbed the "Subway Vigilante" by the New York press; to his supporters, he came to symbolize frustrations with the high crime rates of the 1980s. The incident has been cited as leading to successful National Rifle Association campaigns to loosen restrictions for concealed carrying of firearms.

== Incident ==
In the early afternoon of December 22, 1984, four males in their late teens from the Bronx—19-year-olds Barry Allen, Troy Canty, and Darrell Cabey, and 18-year-old James Ramseur—boarded a downtown 2 train (a Broadway–Seventh Avenue express). Canty would later testify that the victims were en route to steal from video arcade machines in Manhattan. Thirty-seven-year-old Bernhard Goetz boarded the train at the 14th Street station in Manhattan. At the time, about fifteen to twenty other passengers were in a R22 subway car, the seventh car of the ten-car train. Those involved and witnesses disagree what happened next.

Troy Canty asked Goetz how he was, and shortly thereafter stood up, approached Goetz, and made some overture for money: According to Canty he alone approached Goetz, and said, "Can I have $5?" (equivalent to $20 in 2025). According to Goetz, Canty was joined by another of the teens and Canty said, "Give me five dollars" in a "normal tone" of voice with a smile on his face.

In 1986, the New York Court of Appeals concluded from grand jury evidence that Goetz pulled a handgun and fired four shots at the four men, initially striking three of them. After initially opening fire, Goetz then bent down to Cabey, who was cowering on the ground, and said, "You don't look so bad. Here's another," and shot once again, striking Cabey. Cabey's spine was severed, resulting in brain damage and partial paralysis.

Shortly after the shooting, the train conductor entered the car and loudly exclaimed, "What's going on?" He approached Goetz and asked what happened. Goetz pointed to the north end of the car and then told him, "I don't know ... they tried to rob me and I shot them." The conductor then went to the passengers to check if they were injured. The conductor asked Goetz if he was a police officer, which Goetz denied. He then asked Goetz for the gun, which Goetz refused to turn over.

== Bernhard Goetz ==
Bernhard Hugo Goetz was born on November 7, 1947, in the Kew Gardens, Queens, neighborhood to Lutheran German immigrants, as the youngest of four siblings. His father, Bernhard Willard Goetz, immigrated from Osnabrück in 1928 while his mother, Gertrude Karlsberg, fled Germany in the 1930s due to the Nazi government. The couple married in 1935, after Gertrude, a German Jew, converted to Lutheranism. Goetz grew up in Red Hook and Rhinebeck in Upstate New York, where his father ran a dairy farm and a bookbinding business. In 1960, his father was convicted of molesting two teenage boys, due to which Goetz and one of his sisters were sent to attend boarding school in Switzerland before returning to the United States to obtain a bachelor's degree in electrical engineering and nuclear engineering from New York University. Goetz then moved to Orlando, Florida, where his family had relocated, and worked at his father's residential development business. After a divorce, Goetz moved back to New York City, where he started an electronics business out of his Greenwich Village apartment.

According to Goetz, in early 1981, he was the victim of a robbery at the Canal Street subway station. Goetz reported that three black teenagers had smashed him into a plate-glass door and thrown him to the ground, injuring his chest and knee. Goetz was involved in a struggle with one of the teenagers until police arrived; that individual accused Goetz of assaulting him. To his frustration, Goetz was detained for six hours, while the person he accused was released in two and a half hours. Goetz subsequently applied for a permit to carry a concealed handgun, on the basis of routinely carrying valuable equipment and large sums of cash, but his application was denied on the grounds of "insufficient need". During a trip to Florida, he bought the five-shot .38-caliber revolver that he ultimately would use in the shooting.

Goetz was known to use racist language; his neighbor, Myra Friedman, reported overhearing Goetz having said, "The only way we're going to clean up this street is to get rid of the spics and niggers" at a community meeting eighteen months before the shooting. Friedman's account was excluded from the criminal jury trial, but in a subsequent civil action, Goetz admitted to having used both epithets at a neighborhood meeting.

== Victims ==
Goetz's four victims, Barry Allen, Troy Canty, Darrell Cabey, and James Ramseur lived in the Morrisania, Bronx neighborhood, an area known at the time for high rates of poverty and crime. The four were between the ages of eighteen and nineteen and were described as five foot six or shorter and thin. None of the four had completed high school. Each of the youths shot by Goetz was facing a trial or hearing on criminal charges at the time of their shooting. Ten weeks prior to being shot, Cabey was arrested on charges that he held up three men with a shotgun in the Bronx, and he was released on $2,000 bail.

== Goetz's flight, surrender, and interrogation ==
After the shooting, Goetz took a cab back to his 14th Street home before renting a car and driving north to Bennington, Vermont; he then burned the distinctive blue jacket he had been wearing and scattered the pieces of his gun in the woods. Goetz stayed at various hotels in New England for several days.

On December 26, an anonymous hotline caller told New York City police that Goetz matched the gunman's description, owned a gun, and had been assaulted previously. On December 29, Goetz called his neighbor, Myra Friedman, who told him that police had come by his apartment looking for him and had left notes asking to be contacted as soon as possible. Goetz told Friedman he had felt as though he was in a "combat situation", needing to "think more quickly than [his] opposition."

Goetz returned to New York City on December 30, turned in the car, picked up some clothing and business papers at his apartment, rented another car, and drove back to New England. Shortly after noon the next day, he walked into the Concord, New Hampshire police headquarters and told the officer on duty, "I am the person they are seeking in New York." Once the officer realized that Goetz was a genuine suspect, Goetz was Mirandized and elected to talk to the police. The Concord police made an audio recording of Goetz's interview. New York City police detectives Susan Braver, Michael Clark, and Dan Hattendorf subsequently interviewed Goetz, and a two-hour video recording of that interview was made. Both interviews were played at the criminal trial.

Goetz told police that he felt that he was being robbed and was at risk of violence, and he explained he had been both mugged once before and nearly mugged several times: "I've been in situations where I've shown the gun. ... The threat, when I was surrounded, and at that point, showing the gun would have been enough, but when I saw this one fellow [Canty], when I saw the gleam in his eye ... and the smile on his face ... and they say it's a joke and lot of them say it's a joke." Asked what his intentions were when he drew his revolver, Goetz replied, "My intention was to murder them, to hurt them, to make them suffer as much as possible." Goetz also said that, after firing four shots, he moved to Cabey and said, "You seem to be doing all right, here's another," before shooting at him again.

Later in the tape, Goetz said, "If I had more bullets, I would have shot them all again and again. My problem was I ran out of bullets." He added, "I was gonna', I was gonna' gouge one of the guys' [Canty's] eyes out with my keys afterwards", but said he stopped when he saw the fear in his eyes. He denied any premeditation for the shooting, something on which the press had speculated.

== Legal aftermath ==
=== Criminal case ===
Goetz was brought back to Manhattan on January 3, 1985, and arraigned on four charges of attempted murder, with bail set at $50,000. He was held in protective custody at the Rikers Island prison hospital. Refusing offers of bail assistance from the public and from his family, he posted bail with his own funds and was released on bond January 8.

==== Indictments ====
Manhattan District Attorney Robert Morgenthau asked a grand jury to indict Goetz on four counts of attempted murder, four of assault, four of reckless endangerment, and one of criminal possession of a weapon. On January 25, the grand jury refused to indict Goetz on the more serious charges, voting indictments only for unlawful gun possession—one count of criminal possession of a weapon in the third degree, for carrying in public the loaded unlicensed gun used in the subway shooting, and two counts of possession in the fourth degree, for keeping two other unlicensed handguns in his home.

In March 1985, Morgenthau announced that the state had obtained new evidence—an unnamed witness—and sought leave to convene a second grand jury; Judge Stephen Crane granted Morgenthau's motion. Morgenthau granted immunity to Troy Canty and James Ramseur, which he had previously declined to do, allowing them to testify before the second grand jury. The second grand jury indicted Goetz on charges of attempted murder, assault, reckless endangerment and weapons possession. In January 1986, Judge Crane granted a motion by Goetz to dismiss these new indictments. Judge Crane dismissed the charges on two grounds: First, he held that the prosecutor had erred when instructing the grand jury that, for Goetz's actions to be protected by New York's self-defense statute, they would have to be objectively reasonable. Second, he found that Canty and Ramseur "strongly appeared" to have perjured themselves. (Note: Although Judge Crane did not specify his bases for the perjury finding, The New York Times reported that it appeared to be based on alleged statements by Canty, Ramseur, and Cabey: According to police officer Peter Smith, who responded to the shooting, Canty told him that the group was planning to rob Goetz, but Goetz shot them first, though Police Commissioner Benjamin Ward said through a spokesman that he did not find Smith's account credible. Ramseur gave an interview to the Cable News Network saying he believed Goetz thought he was going to be robbed. And Cabey, while in the hospital, allegedly told New York Daily News reporter Jimmy Breslin that the other members of the group planned to rob Goetz because he "looked like easy bait" (though Cabey denied involvement himself).)

The prosecution appealed the case, maintaining that a self-defense justification required objective reasonableness and that the statements Judge Crane relied on did not indicate perjury or require dismissal. In July 1986, after an appellate division upheld Judge Crane's dismissal, the New York Court of Appeals reversed the appellate division and reinstated the charges. The high court clarified that a defendant's subjective perception of imminent danger does not, by itself, justify the use of force; instead, it held, that belief must be both subjectively held and objectively reasonable. Additionally, the court held that Judge Crane's perjury finding was "speculat[ive]" and "particularly inappropriate": "[A]ll that has come to light is hearsay evidence that conflicts with part of Canty's testimony. There is no statute or controlling case law requiring dismissal of an indictment merely because, months later, the prosecutor becomes aware of some information which may lead to the defendant's acquittal."

==== Trial ====
In December 1986, jury selection began and, in April 1987, the trial commenced before a Manhattan jury of ten whites and two blacks, six of whom had been victims of street crime. Goetz was represented by Barry Slotnick and Mark M. Baker. Goetz conceded that he had shot the four men, but he asserted that his actions were justified by section 35.15(2) of New York's justification statute, which, with non-relevant exceptions, permitted the use of deadly force when actor "reasonably believes that such other person is using or about to use deadly physical force ... or ... is committing or attempting to commit a kidnapping, forcible rape, forcible sodomy or robbery".

The key question for the jurors was how to separate the vague perception of intimidation from the more specific threat of robbery, or from the "threat of deadly physical force," which Justice Crane told the jurors were the two grounds that would justify Mr. Goetz's use of his weapon.

— Kirk Johnson, The New York Times

Both prosecution and defense agreed that the jury would be required to consider several factual questions, including (1) whether the teenagers had acted as a group or as individuals, (2) whether Goetz had shot Cabey after the immediate threat was over, and (3) whether Goetz was threatened.

As to whether Goetz had been threatened, Canty testified that he was merely panhandling when he asked Goetz for $5. Ramseur testified that Canty approached Goetz alone and that he, Allen, and Cabey remained seated, but Ramseur's testimony was stricken after he professed his belief that Goetz would be acquitted regardless of the evidence and eventually refused to answer Slotnick's questions. Neither Goetz nor Cabey testified, and Allen took the Fifth Amendment. Amanda Gilbert, a witness, testified that Cabey, after being shot, told her, "I didn't do anything. He shot me for nothing," but her testimony was stricken as hearsay. The defense called police officer Peter Smith, who testified that, after he arrived on the scene, Canty had told him that the group was planning to rob Goetz. On cross examination, the prosecution pointed out that Smith had failed to report the statement to his superiors or to a reporter when giving a television interview.

Another point of contention at trial was whether Goetz had shot at least some of the men in the back. For the defense, Dominick DiMaio, Suffolk County's former medical examiner, testified that Allen, Canty, Cabey, and Ramseur had been standing in a semi-circle around Goetz when he opened fire. However, the county's then-current medical examiner, Charles Hirsch, offered rebuttal testimony that it was medically impossible to determine how the victims were positioned when shot, and he also found that the bullets that hit Allen and Cabey had traveled from back to front, suggesting that both had been shot in the back. Ballistics expert Joseph Quirk, for the defense, testified that Allen had been shot while ducking rather than while running away. On cross examination, Quirk conceded that the prosecution's theory was also consistent with the evidence, and, after being shown a photograph of a bullet-entry wound in Allen's back, Quirk admitted that he had based his theory as to Allen on incorrect information provided to him by the defense.

Specifically related to Goetz's shooting of Cabey, the parties contested whether Cabey had been struck by the fourth or fifth shot and whether, if the fifth, Goetz had paused before firing. According to the prosecution, Goetz shot the seated Cabey at point-blank range with his fifth bullet; the defense argued that Goetz had fired all five shots in short order and Cabey had been hit by the fourth shot before collapsing. One witness testified that, consistent with Goetz's since-recanted police statement, Goetz opened fire before approaching to within "two to three feet" of a seated Cabey; the witness demonstrated how Goetz stood directly in front of Cabey and fired downward, shooting Cabey in the stomach. However, the eight other witnesses who testified on the matter reported that all of the shots came in "rapid succession"—one said the firing lasted "about a second", and none of those eight testified that they had observed Goetz standing in front of Cabey.

==== Verdict and post-verdict appeal ====
Goetz was acquitted of the attempted-murder and first-degree-assault charges and convicted of criminal possession of a weapon in the third degree for carrying a loaded, unlicensed weapon in a public place. (Note: The jury found that Goetz lacked the specific intent to commit attempted murder, never technically reaching the justification question; however, because intent was not seriously challenged at trial, subsequent analyses postulated that the jury had effectively incorporated self-defense into the intent analysis.) Goetz was originally sentenced to six months in jail, one year's psychiatric treatment, five years' probation, 200 hours of community service, and a $5,000 fine. Goetz appealed the conviction and sentence. As to the conviction, Goetz argued that the judge's jury instructions improperly discouraged jury nullification; the appellate division and New York Court of Appeals rejected that argument. As to the sentence, Goetz argued that the state's gun laws required, at minimum, a one-year sentence. (Under New York's then-existing law, a defendant sentenced to six months would have been required to serve, at minimum, 90 days, while a defendant sentenced to one year would be eligible for release after 60 days.) On this point, the appellate court agreed, overturning the sentence. On remand, Judge Crane sentenced Goetz to one-year incarceration and a $5,000 fine. Goetz ultimately served eight months, receiving credit for good behavior.

=== Civil litigation ===
==== Cabey v. Goetz ====
A month after the shootings, Cabey, represented by William Kunstler and Ron Kuby, filed a civil suit against Goetz. The civil case was tried in 1996. Unlike Goetz's criminal jury, which was predominantly White and from Manhattan, the civil jury was half African American and entirely from the Bronx. Additionally, crime in New York City had fallen substantially since the criminal trial.

While race had only been subliminally addressed in the criminal trial, Cabey's civil-trial attorneys explicitly argued that Goetz had been motivated by race. Goetz admitted to previous use of racial language and to smoking PCP-laced marijuana during the 1980s. For the defense, Jimmy Breslin testified that, in a 1985 hospital-bed interview, Cabey, while denying his own involvement, said that Allen, Canty, and Ramseur intended to rob Goetz because he looked like "easy bait," but Cabey's attorneys pointed out that Cabey had suffered brain damage prior to the interview and that Breslin's column described Cabey as "confused."

The jury found that Goetz had acted recklessly and had deliberately inflicted emotional distress on Cabey. Jurors awarded Cabey $43 million; $18 million for pain and suffering and $25 million in punitive damages. Goetz subsequently filed for bankruptcy, saying that legal expenses had left him almost penniless. A United States bankruptcy court judge ruled that the $43 million judgment was nondischargeable.

Because Goetz was only "sporadically employed as an electrical engineering consultant," the expectation was that 10% of Goetz's income for the next 20 years would be garnished. Stephen Somerstein, one of Cabey's attorneys, expressed some optimism that a portion of any book deal Goetz signed could contribute to the judgment. In 2000, Kuby told reporters that he had hired a firm specializing in debt collection to pursue Goetz, but he noted that Goetz "appear[ed] to be living in voluntary squalor." Asked in 2004 whether he was making payments on the judgment, Goetz responded "I don't think I've paid a penny on that", and referred any questions on the subject to his attorney.

==== Goetz's defamation claims ====
In 1990, Goetz filed a defamation action against Cabey; his mother, Sherry; and his attorneys, Kunstler and Kuby. The suit was dismissed.

In 1994, Goetz filed another defamation action related to My Life as a Radical Lawyer, a book by Kunstler, published by Carol Communications, Inc. Amongst other claims, Goetz objected to the book's description of him as a "paranoid" "murderous vigilante" who had "developed a hatred for blacks." Goetz specifically objected that the book's description of him as a racist hurt his "good name, reputation, feelings, and public standing." The court granted summary judgment in favor of the defendants, finding that the statements complained of were, varyingly, protected opinion (rather than actionable fact statements), not defamatory, or substantially true.

== Public reaction ==
The shootings initially drew considerable support from the public. A Daily News-WABC-TV poll released in January 1985 showed 49 percent of the 515 New Yorkers questioned approved of Goetz's actions, while only 31 percent disapproved. A special hotline set up by police to seek information was swamped by calls supporting the shooter and calling him a hero. In March, Morgenthau reported that the letters his office received were running 3 to 1 in Goetz's favor. The same month, a Gallup poll interviewing 1,009 adults found that 57% of respondents approved of Goetz's shootings and two-thirds said that Goetz had acted in self defense. However, compared to the January poll, Goetz's support among African Americans had dipped considerably: while only 36% of Black respondents disapproved of his actions in the January poll, 53% reported disapproval in the March poll. Questions of what impact race had on Goetz's thinking, the public's reaction, and the verdict by the (predominately White) criminal jury became hotly debated. The Los Angeles Times reported that, during the criminal trial, demonstrators outside the courtroom chanted "Bernhard Goetz, you can't hide; we charge you with genocide."

Initial sources differed in reporting the sequence of shots fired, timing of shots, whether Cabey was shot once or twice, and whether any of the men Goetz shot were armed. Some reports, picking up on Goetz's statement to the police, suggested that Cabey had been shot twice, but later reporting revealed that he had been shot only once in his left side. Additionally, early reports suggested that the teenagers had approached Goetz carrying "sharpened" screwdrivers; those reports, too, were found to be false: The screwdrivers—Cabey carried two and Ramseur carried one—were not sharpened and, based on the available testimony, were not removed from Cabey's or Ramseur's pockets—no witnesses reported seeing screwdrivers, and Goetz repeatedly denied he was threatened with them. When Canty testified at Goetz's criminal trial, he said they were to be used to break into video arcade change boxes and not as weapons.

Supporters viewed Goetz as a hero for standing up to his attackers and defending himself in an environment where the police were increasingly viewed as ineffective in combating crime. The Guardian Angels, a volunteer patrol group of mostly Black and Hispanic teenagers, collected thousands of dollars from subway riders toward a legal defense fund for Goetz. The Congress of Racial Equality (CORE), a right-leaning civil rights organization, supported Goetz. CORE's director, Roy Innis (who had lost two of his sons to inner-city gun violence and would later be elected to the executive board of the NRA), offered to raise defense money, saying that Goetz was "the avenger for all of us". A legal group founded by the NRA—the Firearms Civil Rights Legal Defense Fund—donated $20,000 to Goetz's defense. Harvard Professor of Government James Q. Wilson explained the broad sentiment by saying, "It may simply indicate that there are no more liberals on the crime and law-and-order issue in New York City, because they've all been mugged." Professor Stephen L. Carter bemoaned the public's initial reaction to the shooting, arguing, "The tragedy of the Goetz case is that a public barely aware of the facts was rooting for him to get away with it. The tragedy is that a public eager to identify transgressors in advance decided from the start that Mr. Goetz was a hero and that his black victims deserved what they got."

While race was never explicitly mentioned at the criminal trial, Professor George P. Fletcher argued that Goetz's criminal-defense team—which referred to the men Goetz shot as "savages", "predators", and "vultures"—made a "covert appeal to racial bias", which, he argued "came out most dramatically in [a re-enactment] of the shooting." In the courtroom re-enactment, four "fit and muscular" Black members of the Guardian Angels were asked to portray the four teenagers Goetz shot and surround Goetz. Professor Bennett Capers agreed that the use of the four "large black men" to stand in for the "four black youths" was, effectively, a "backdoor race-ing". As to the criminal verdict, Benjamin Hooks, director of the NAACP, called the outcome "inexcusable", adding, "It was proven—according to his own statements—that Goetz did the shooting and went far beyond the realm of self-defense. There was no provocation for what he did." Representative Floyd Flake agreed, saying, "I think that if a black had shot four whites, the cry for the death penalty would have been almost automatic."

United States Attorney Rudolph Giuliani met with black political and religious leaders calling for a federal civil-rights investigation. C. Vernon Mason, an attorney and spokesperson for the group, said, "We have come to the Federal Government as black people traditionally have done to seek redress when it is clear that state and local authorities have either failed to act or are incapable of acting." After an investigation, Giuliani ultimately determined that Goetz had acted out of fear, which he distinguished from a "racial motivation". In a 2007 interview with Stone Phillips of Dateline NBC, Goetz admitted that his fear may have been enhanced due to the fact that the four men he shot were black.

== Subsequent developments ==
After reaching an all-time peak in 1990, crime in New York City dropped dramatically through the rest of the decade. New York City crime rates by 2014 were comparable to those of the early 1960s.

Following the shooting, the four victims and their families received hate mail. Darrell Cabey fell into a coma after the shooting; he suffered irreversible brain damage and was paralyzed from the waist down. In 1985 an outstanding armed robbery charge against him was dropped when the Bronx district attorney determined he had the capacity of an 8-year-old. Goetz accused Cabey of exaggerating his injuries. In 1993, Goetz questioned Cabey as to his injuries in two depositions, to which Cabey was unable to elicit an answer longer than a single sentence; when asked, Cabey denied having previously heard the name "Bernie Goetz".

Troy Canty entered drug-rehabilitation and vocational-training programs. One of Canty's attorneys, Scott H. Greenfield, reported that Canty planned to attend culinary school.

In March 1985, James Ramseur reported to police that two men apparently hired by Goetz kidnapped and attempted to murder him. The following day, after detectives played back to Ramseur the emergency 911 recording reporting the kidnapping, Ramseur admitted it was his voice on the call and to fabricating the report. Ramseur explained it was merely to test police response when a Black person was a crime victim, and was not prosecuted for this hoax. Ramseur was convicted in 1986 of the rape and robbery of a young pregnant woman a year prior. Conditionally released in 2002, Ramseur returned to prison for a parole violation in 2005; he finished his sentence in July 2010. On December 22, 2011, the shooting's 27th anniversary, James Ramseur died at age 45 of a drug overdose in an apparent suicide.

In 1989, Barry Allen was charged with robbing a 58-year-old man of $54. In 1991, he was convicted and sentenced between 3.5 to 7 years. He was released from prison in 1995 and died several years later.

Goetz achieved celebrity status after the shooting. In 2001, he unsuccessfully ran for mayor of New York City; amongst other issues, Goetz advocated for a vegetarian menu in New York City schools, jails, and hospitals. In 2004, Goetz was interviewed by Nancy Grace on Larry King Live, where he stated his actions were good for New York City and forced the city to address crime. In 2005, Goetz unsuccessfully ran for public advocate; he described the subway shooting on his campaign website. In late 2013, Goetz was arrested and apartment searched for allegedly attempting to sell marijuana to an undercover police officer. After Goetz's attorney moved for dismissal on speedy-trial grounds, a judge agreed that prosecutors took 14 days too long to prosecute the case, and it was dismissed in September 2014. Goetz said after court, "I think an individual in this instance is under an obligation to throw as much sand in the mechanism as they can."

In 2023, African-American civil rights leader Al Sharpton and former assistant district attorney Mark Bederow compared the Goetz case to the killing of Jordan Neely.

== In popular culture ==
Bernie Goetz is mentioned in Billy Joel's 1989 song "We Didn't Start the Fire".

In the 30 Rock episode "Subway Hero", Jack refers to Dennis Duffy as "the greatest New Yorker since Bernie Goetz".

The protagonist of the 2019 film Joker is partly inspired by Goetz. Todd Phillips, who wrote, produced and directed the film, grew up in New York City and remembered the 1984 subway shooting from his youth.

The board game The Subway Vigilante was inspired by the shooting and sold 40,000 copies.

== See also ==
- 1993 Long Island Rail Road shooting
- 2022 New York City Subway attack
- Vigilantism
- Self-defense
- List of shootings in New York
- Fear and Fury: The Reagan Eighties, the Bernie Goetz Shootings, and the Rebirth of White Rage
- Five Bullets: The Story of Bernie Goetz, New York's Explosive '80s, and the Subway Vigilante Trial that Divided the Nation
