= List of references in We Didn't Start the Fire =

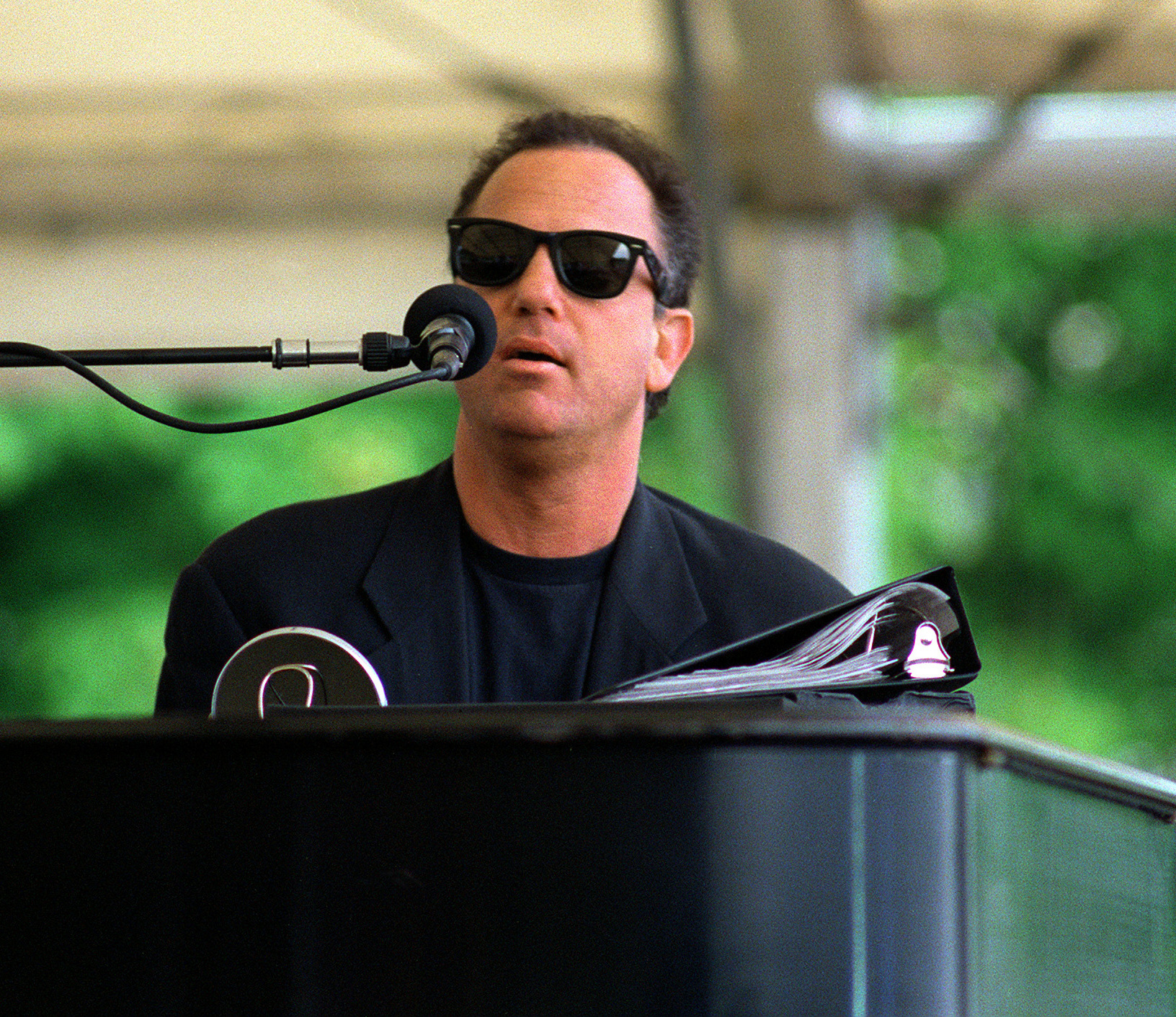
Billy Joel in 1994

"We Didn't Start the Fire" is a 1989 hit single by American musician Billy Joel in which the lyrics tell the history of the United States from 1949 to 1989 through a series of cultural references. (Note: Further information regarding American history in this period can be found at History of the United States (1945–1964), History of the United States (1964–1980), and History of the United States (1980–1991).) In total, the song contains 118 or 119 (Note: Sources disagree as to the total amount of references. This article follows the count of 119.) references to historical people, places, events, and phenomena. The idea for creating a song chronicling news events and personalities originally came to Joel from a conversation he had with a friend of Sean Lennon, wherein he claimed that nothing of note happened in the news during the early life of Joel. In his effort to prove the friend wrong, Joel began listing various important global events such as the Korean War, the Little Rock Crisis, and the Hungarian Revolution. The references are presented in roughly chronological order, beginning with Joel's birth in 1949 and culminating in 1989, when Joel had turned 40 years old. The song proved divisive, with some praising its educational value and others (including Joel himself) criticizing the melody.

== List ==
Lists cataloging every reference in the song have previously been published by Encyclopædia Britannica, Far Out, and Ranker.

No.	Lyric	Subject	Date	Description
1	"Harry Truman"	Second inauguration of Harry S. Truman	January 20, 1949	Harry S. Truman is inaugurated after he unexpectedly wins the 1948 United States presidential election.
2	"Doris Day"	Doris Day	1949	Day's debut album You're My Thrill is released, and stars in two hit movies, My Dream Is Yours, and It's a Great Feeling, making her a well-known celebrity singer and actress.
3	"Red China"	Proclamation of the People's Republic of China	October 1, 1949	Following the Communist victory in the Chinese Civil War, the People's Republic of China is established.
4	"Johnnie Ray"	Johnnie Ray	1949	Ray signs a contract with Okeh Records, which starts his career as a famous rock and roll musician.
5	"South Pacific"	South Pacific (musical)	April 7, 1949	South Pacific debuts on Broadway to critical and popular success.
6	"Walter Winchell"	Walter Winchell	1949	Winchell stands "at the height of his popularity" but soon comes under public scrutiny for his promotion of McCarthyism.
7	"Joe DiMaggio"	Joe DiMaggio	February 7, 1949	DiMaggio signs a contract to play for the New York Yankees, becoming the first American league player to earn over $99,000.
8	"Joe McCarthy"	Joseph McCarthy	February 9, 1950	Senator McCarthy gives his Lincoln Day speech, launching his career as an anticommunist fearmonger.
9	"Richard Nixon"	Richard Nixon	November 7, 1950	Nixon is elected to the United States Congress as senator.
10	"Studebaker"	Studebaker	1950	The car manufacturer enters a period of financial decline which leads to it merging with Packard to form Studebaker-Packard four years later.
11	"Television"	Golden Age of Television	1950	In 1950, less than 10% of households in the US had a television set. By the end of the decade, it would rise to nearly 86%. This was at least part of the "golden age" of television in the United States, that ended in 1958.
12	"North Korea"	Korean War	June 25, 1950	The communist North invades its anticommunist counterpart in a major intensification of the Cold War.
13	"South Korea"	Korean War	June 25, 1950	The communist North invades its anticommunist counterpart in a major intensification of the Cold War.
14	"Marilyn Monroe"	Marilyn Monroe	1950	Monroe appears in five movies in one year: Right Cross, The Asphalt Jungle, All About Eve, The Fireball, and A Ticket to Tomahawk.
15	"Rosenbergs"	Julius and Ethel Rosenberg	April 5, 1951	The Rosenbergs are sentenced to death on the charge of conspiracy to commit espionage for the Soviet Union by sharing classified information relating to the development of nuclear weapons.
16	"H-bomb"	Hydrogen bomb	1951	The United States government under the Truman administration begins developing and testing thermonuclear weapons.
17	"Sugar Ray"	Sugar Ray Robinson vs. Jake LaMotta	February 14, 1951	In their final boxing match, Robinson beats LaMotta with such brutality that the event is dubbed "The Saint Valentine's Day Massacre."
18	"Panmunjom"	Panmunjom	August 1951	Negotiations for a ceasefire to the Korean War relocate to the village of Panmunjom, where an armistice agreement would be signed two years later.
19	"Brando"	Marlon Brando	September 19, 1951	Brando performs in the first film rendition of A Streetcar Named Desire, earning an Academy Award nomination for Best Actor.
20	"The King and I"	The King and I	March 29, 1951	The Broadway musical premieres to critical and popular success, earning several Tony Awards.
21	"The Catcher in the Rye"	The Catcher in the Rye	July 16, 1951	The novel is published to both critical acclaim and moral controversy due to obscene content.
22	"Eisenhower"	Dwight D. Eisenhower	November 4, 1952	Eisenhower is elected 34th president of the United States.
23	"Vaccine"	Salk polio vaccine	July 2, 1952	Jonas Salk begins testing vaccines which would later prove successful in preventing the disease polio.
24	"England's got a new queen"	Proclamation of accession of Elizabeth II	February 6, 1952	George VI dies, causing his heiress Elizabeth to be proclaimed Queen of the United Kingdom.
25	"Marciano"	Rocky Marciano	September 23, 1952	Marciano becomes world heavyweight boxing champion after knocking out his predecessor Jersey Joe Walcott.
26	"Liberace"	Liberace	February 3, 1952	Consisting of live musical shows hosted by Liberace himself, The Liberace Show begins airing on television to popular success.
27	"Santayana goodbye"	George Santayana	September 26, 1952	Santayana, an influential Spanish-American philosopher, dies of cancer in Rome, Italy.
28	"Joseph Stalin"	Death of Joseph Stalin	March 5, 1953	Soviet dictator Joseph Stalin dies, ending his reign of totalitarianism.
29	"Malenkov"	Georgy Malenkov	March 6, 1953	Malenkov succeeds Stalin as leader of the Soviet Union.
30	"Nasser"	Gamal Abdel Nasser	July 23, 1952	Nasser successfully leads the Free Officers movement in overthrowing King Farouk in the 1952 Egyptian revolution.
31	"Prokofiev"	Sergei Prokofiev	March 5, 1953	The renowned Russian composer dies of a stroke on the same day as Joseph Stalin.
32	"Rockefeller"	Divorce between Winthrop Rockefeller and Barbara "Bobo" Sears (Note: It is not exactly clear which member of the Rockefeller family Joel is referring to, although both the Britannica and Far Out connect the reference to the divorce.)	June 19, 1954	Rockefeller pays $5,750,000 to Sears in a divorce settlement, a record-breaking amount.
33	"Campanella"	Roy Campanella	November 27, 1953	Campanella receives the Major League Baseball Most Valuable Player Award for a second time, which he would win again two years later.
34	"Communist Bloc"	Communist Bloc	June 17, 1953	The Communist government of East Germany receives military aid from the Soviet Union to quell a workers' uprising.
35	"Roy Cohn"	Roy Cohn	July 1954	Cohn resigns as Chief Counsel of the Permanent Subcommittee on Investigations due to the Army–McCarthy hearings, during which he had served as McCarthy's top aide.
36	"Juan Perón"	Juan Perón	1954	Juan Perón spends his last year as Argentina's president before he is ousted in a military coup.
37	"Toscanini"	Arturo Toscanini	April 4, 1954	The virtuoso conductor performs his final concert with the NBC Symphony Orchestra.
38	"Dacron"	Dacron	1954	Surgeon Michael DeBakey begins experimenting with the polyester fiber, eventually using it to develop the first artificial arterial patches.
39	"Dien Bien Phu Falls"	Battle of Dien Bien Phu	May 7, 1954	The Viet Minh capture the key city of Điện Biên Phủ, a decisive victory in the First Indochina War.
40	"Rock Around the Clock"	Rock Around the Clock	April 12, 1954	Bill Haley & His Comets release their rendition of the song, which would later achieve commercial success in 1955.
41	"Einstein"	Death of Albert Einstein	April 18, 1955	The renowned physicist dies of heart failure.
42	"James Dean"	Death of James Dean	September 30, 1955	The celebrity actor dies in a car crash at age 24.
43	"Brooklyn's got a winning team"	Brooklyn Dodgers in the 1955 World Series	October 4, 1955	The baseball team becomes the World Series champion after beating the New York Yankees.
44	"Davy Crockett"	Davy Crockett: King of the Wild Frontier	May 25, 1955	An edited compilation of the titular miniseries releases as a standalone movie.
45	"Peter Pan"	Peter Pan	March 7, 1955	The 1954 musical adaptation of J.M. Barrie's play starring Mary Martin is broadcast live as part of NBC's Producers' Showcase.
46	"Elvis Presley"	Elvis Presley	November 21, 1955	The "King of Rock and Roll" signs a recording contract with RCA Victor.
47	"Disneyland"	Disneyland	July 17, 1955	The first Disneyland amusement park opens in Anaheim, California.
48	"Bardot"	Brigitte Bardot	November 28, 1956	Bardot stars as the leading actress in And God Created Woman, establishing her status as a sex symbol.
49	"Budapest"	Hungarian Revolution of 1956	October 23, 1956	A revolution against the Communist Hungarian government breaks out in Budapest, Hungary's capital.
50	"Alabama"	Montgomery bus boycott	December 20, 1956	African American activist Rosa Parks incites a boycott of public transit in Montgomery, Alabama after being convicted of violating racial segregation laws in a segregated bus.
51	"Khrushchev"	Nikita Khrushchev	February 25, 1956	Soviet leader Khrushchev delivers his "Secret Speech", a denunciation of Joseph Stalin's cult of personality and a herald of his policy of De-Stalinization.
52	"Princess Grace"	Wedding of Rainier III, Prince of Monaco, and Grace Kelly	April 18, 1956	The American actress Grace Kelly marries Rainier III, Prince of Monaco, thereafter becoming Princess of Monaco.
53	"Peyton Place"	Peyton Place	September 24, 1956	The novel is released and achieves commercial success, staying on a best-seller list for 26 weeks.
54	"Trouble in the Suez"	Suez Crisis	July 26, 1956	Egyptian president Nasser nationalizes the Suez Canal, provoking a Franco–Israeli–British invasion of Egypt.
55	"Little Rock"	Little Rock Crisis	September 24, 1957	American president Eisenhower deploys members of the 101st Airborne Division to guard the entry of nine African American students into Little Rock Central High School.
56	"Pasternak"	Boris Pasternak	November 23, 1957	Pasternak's novel Doctor Zhivago is published to critical acclaim and wins the Nobel Prize in Literature the following year.
57	"Mickey Mantle"	Mickey Mantle	November 22, 1957	The baseballer wins his second consecutive MVP award, leading the league in walks and runs scored.
58	"Kerouac"	Jack Kerouac	September 5, 1957	Kerouac's novel On the Road is published to critical acclaim.
59	"Sputnik"	Sputnik 1	October 4, 1957	Sputnik 1, the first artificial Earth satellite, was launched into orbit by the Soviet Union.
60	"Chou En-Lai"	Zhou Enlai	January 1957	Chinese premier Zhou begins engaging in shuttle diplomacy in the Soviet Union and Eastern Europe.
61	"Bridge on the River Kwai"	The Bridge on the River Kwai	October 2, 1957	The movie is first released and later wins seven Academy Awards, including an Academy Award for Best Picture.
62	"Lebanon"	1958 Lebanon crisis	July 15, 1958	The United States sends 15,000 marines around Beirut to aid president Camille Chamoun of Lebanon.
63	"Charles de Gaulle"	Charles de Gaulle	December 21, 1958	De Gaulle is elected the first president of the French Fifth Republic.
64	"California baseball"	Major League Baseball relocations of 1950s–1960s	1958	The New York Giants and the Brooklyn Dodgers both move to California, thereafter becoming the San Francisco Giants and the Los Angeles Dodgers.
65	"Starkweather homicide"	Charles Starkweather	January 21, 1958	Starkweather begins a murder spree, eventually claiming 11 lives by January 1958.
66	"Children of Thalidomide"	Thalidomide scandal	1958	The immunomodulatory drug thalidomide is first introduced in the European market. Later brought to the United States, it would be linked to thousands of birth defects and stillbirths.
67	"Buddy Holly"	The Day the Music Died	February 3, 1959	American rock and roll musicians Buddy Holly, Ritchie Valens, and "The Big Bopper" J. P. Richardson die in a plane crash near Clear Lake, Iowa, together with pilot Roger Peterson.
68	"Ben-Hur"	Ben-Hur	November 18, 1959	The Biblical epic film Ben-Hur releases to overwhelmingly positive reviews.
69	"Space monkey"	Miss Baker	May 28, 1959	A squirrel monkey named Miss Baker and a rhesus macaque named Able become the first two animals to be launched into space by the United States and safely return. Other monkeys and apes follow them before humans go to space.
70	"Mafia"	Vito Genovese	April 17, 1959	American Mafia mobster Vito Genovese is sentenced to 15 years in the Atlanta Federal Penitentiary in Atlanta, 17 months after he and 19 other high-ranking mafiosi were arrested at the Apalachin meeting in November 1957.
71	"Hula hoops"	Hula hoop	1959	Australian businessman Alex Tolmer begins selling hoops made of plastic, and rights are purchased by the American toy company Wham-O. The toy becomes a massive fad in the United States, reaching over 100 million sales in two years.
72	"Castro"	Fidel Castro	February 16, 1959	Revolutionary leader Fidel Castro becomes the fifteenth Prime Minister of Cuba after the end of the Cuban Revolution.
73	"Edsel is a no-go"	Edsel	November 19, 1959	The Ford Motor Company's Edsel brand of automobiles performs very poorly, and the word "Edsel" becomes a shorthand for any massive and embarrassing failure.
74	"U-2"	1960 U-2 incident	May 1, 1960	An American Lockheed U-2 is shot down by the Soviet Air Defence Forces deep within Soviet territory, embarrassing the United States on the international stage and causing the cancellation of a summit in Paris.
75	"Syngman Rhee"	Syngman Rhee	March 15, 1960	The South Korean government claims that Syngman Rhee wins 100% of the vote in the March 1960 South Korean presidential election, leading to widespread protests against election fraud. The protests spiral into the April Revolution, leading to the collapse of the First Republic and the resignation and exile of Rhee.
76	"Payola"	Payola	1960	Radio disc jockeys illegally accept bribes to play certain music, causing investigations and criminal charges being filed against several radio hosts such as Alan Freed. In sessions before the House Subcommittee on Legislative Oversight, 335 DJs admit to having received over $263,000 in bribes.
77	"Kennedy"	John F. Kennedy	November 8, 1960	John F. Kennedy is elected as the 35th president of the United States.
78	"Chubby Checker"	Chubby Checker	July 1960	American singer Chubby Checker releases a hit cover of "The Twist", popularizing the dance move into a dance craze.
79	"Psycho"	Psycho	September 8, 1960	The horror film Psycho by Alfred Hitchcock releases, becoming Hitchcock's most famous and influential work.
80	"Belgians in the Congo"	Congo Crisis	July 5, 1960 – November 25, 1965	After the fall of the Belgian Congo, a series of civil wars break out in the country, with Belgian troops attempting to regain control. The crisis serves as a proxy war between the United States and the Soviet Union.
81	"Hemingway"	Ernest Hemingway	July 2, 1961	Writer Ernest Hemingway commits suicide in his home in Idaho.
82	"Eichmann"	Adolf Eichmann	December 11–15, 1961	Nazi war criminal Adolf Eichmann is captured in Argentina by Israeli agents and brought to Israel to stand trial, where he is found guilty and is later executed by hanging on June 1, 1962.
83	"Stranger in a Strange Land"	Stranger in a Strange Land	June 1, 1961	Robert A. Heinlein's science fiction novel becomes iconic and influential in the counterculture of the 1960s.
84	"Dylan"	Bob Dylan	October 26, 1961	American musician Bob Dylan is signed to Columbia Records.
85	"Berlin"	Berlin Wall	August 13, 1961	East Germany begins construction of a wall separating East Berlin and West Berlin, with the primary goal of preventing East Germans from defecting to the West.
86	"Bay of Pigs Invasion"	A4D-2_Skyhawks_of_VA-34_in_flight_over_USS_Essex_(CVS-9)_during_the_Bay_of_Pigs_Invasion_in_April_1961 Bay of Pigs Invasion	April 17–20, 1961	The United States launches a failed invasion of Cuba via Playa Girón, attempting to overthrow the Castro government.
87	"Lawrence of Arabia"	Lawrence of Arabia	December 10, 1962	The 1962 film, an adaptation of Seven Pillars of Wisdom and based on the life of T. E. Lawrence, is released and later gets nominated for ten Oscars at the 35th Academy Awards, winning seven.
88	"British Beatlemania"	Beatlemania	c.1962 – 1966	The Beatles become hugely popular in the United Kingdom, with British press using the term "Beatlemania" to describe the ecstatic, female-led fandom. Beatlemania spreads from the United Kingdom to the United States in 1964.
89	"Ole Miss"	Ole Miss riot of 1962	September 30 – October 1, 1962	A race riot, stoked by Mississippi's state authorities, breaks out at the University of Mississippi (commonly known as Ole Miss) after the admission of James Meredith, a black student, into the formerly segregated school. President John F. Kennedy quells the riot by mobilizing over 20,000 United States Army troops to combat the 3,000 rioters.
90	"John Glenn"	John Glenn	February 20, 1962	John Glenn becomes the third American in space and the first American to orbit the Earth.
91	"Liston beats Patterson"	Floyd Patterson vs. Sonny Liston	September 25, 1962	Boxer Sonny Liston becomes the world heavyweight champion after knocking out Floyd Patterson in the first round of their fight.
92	"Pope Paul"	Pope Paul VI	June 21, 1963	Giovanni Battista Enrico Antonio Maria Montini is elected as the successor of Pope John XXIII, taking the papal name of Paul VI.
93	"Malcolm X"	Malcolm X	December 1, 1963	American civil rights leader Malcolm X commented on the assassination of John F. Kennedy, stating, "the chickens have come home to roost." This caused widespread public outcry and the Nation of Islam to censure him.
94	"British politician sex"	Profumo affair	c. early 1960s	John Profumo, the British Secretary of State for War serving under the Conservative Harold Macmillan, has an extramarital affair with Christine Keeler. The scandal ends Profumo's career and contributes to the Conservative Party's defeat in the 1964 United Kingdom general election.
95	"JFK blown away"	Assassination of John F. Kennedy	November 22, 1963	American president John F. Kennedy is shot in the head by Lee Harvey Oswald while riding in a presidential motorcade through Dealey Plaza in Dallas, Texas.
96	"Birth control"	Griswold v. Connecticut	June 7, 1965	The Supreme Court of the United States rules that married couples have the right to use birth control without government restriction.
97	"Ho Chi Minh"	Ho Chi Minh	September 2, 1969	Ho Chi Minh, the first president of North Vietnam and leader through the beginning of the Vietnam War, dies.
98	"Richard Nixon back again"	Richard Nixon	January 20, 1969	Years after serving as vice president under Dwight D. Eisenhower, Richard Nixon becomes the 37th president of the United States.
99	"Moonshot"	Apollo 11	July 20, 1969	Neil Armstrong and Buzz Aldrin land the Lunar Module Eagle, becoming the first humans to land on the surface of the Moon.
100	"Woodstock"	Woodstock	August 15–18, 1969	The Woodstock Music and Art Fair is held in Bethel, New York. It becomes one of the largest music festivals in history and becomes a defining moment in the counterculture of the 1960s.
101	"Watergate"	Watergate scandal	June 17, 1972	President Richard Nixon is involved with an attempted burglary of the Democratic National Committee headquarters in the Watergate complex. On the verge of impeachment, Nixon resigns and is pardoned by his successor, Gerald Ford.
102	"Punk rock"	Punk rock	c. mid-1970s	The punk rock music genre, spearheaded by bands such as the Ramones and The Stooges, gains international popularity in the 1970s.
103	"Begin"	Menachem Begin	June 21, 1977	Menachem Begin wins the 1977 Israeli legislative election, becoming the sixth Prime Minister of Israel. He and Anwar Sadat are awarded the Nobel Peace Prize in 1978 for signing the Egypt–Israel peace treaty.
104	"Reagan"	Ronald Reagan	1976	Actor Ronald Reagan attempts a presidential campaign against President Gerald Ford and narrowly loses the presidential nomination. Ford later loses the election to Democrat Jimmy Carter. Reagan later runs again, and wins, in 1980.
105	"Palestine"	Israeli–Palestinian conflict	1979 – 1990	Major events in the ongoing Israeli–Palestinian conflict take place from the late 1970s to the early 1990s, including the 1979 Egypt–Israel peace treaty, the 1982 Lebanon War, the 1988 Palestinian Declaration of Independence, and the First Intifada.
106	"Terror on the airline"	Entebbe raid	July 3-4, 1976	Multiple aircraft hijackings take place during the 1970s, including an Air France flight diverted to Uganda, where the plane was stormed.
107	"Ayatollah's in Iran"	Ruhollah Khomeini's return to Iran	February 1, 1979	Ruhollah Khomeini returns to Iran after 14 years in exile, marking an important moment in the Iranian revolution. His return leads to the final overthrow of Mohammad Reza Pahlavi ten days later. Khomeini takes office as the first Supreme Leader of Iran on December 3, 1979.
108	"Russians in Afghanistan"	Soviet–Afghan War	December 24, 1979	The Soviet Union sides with the Democratic Republic of Afghanistan in a war against the anticommunist Afghan mujahideen, marking the beginning of the protracted Afghan conflict.
109	"Wheel of Fortune"	Wheel of Fortune	1981–1983	The game show Wheel of Fortune undergoes several changes, including the hiring of host Pat Sajak, hostess Vanna White, and the launch of a nightly version for first-run syndication, propelling the show to widespread popularity.
110	"Sally Ride"	Sally Ride	June 18, 1983	Sally Ride becomes the first American woman in space.
111	"Heavy metal suicide"	Death of John Daniel McCollum	October 27, 1984	Nineteen-year-old John Daniel McCollum commits suicide while listening to the song "Suicide Solution" from the album Blizzard of Ozz by Ozzy Osbourne. McCollum's parents file a lawsuit against Osbourne, alleging that he is responsible for the death. The lawsuit is dismissed.
112	"Foreign debts"	National debt of the United States	October 23, 1981	Nine months into the presidency of Ronald Reagan, the American national debt passes one trillion dollars.
113	"Homeless vets"	Homeless veterans in the United States	After 1975	Vietnam veterans returning to the United States after the end of the Vietnam War face high levels of homelessness.
114	"AIDS"	HIV/AIDS in the United States	June 5, 1981	The Centers for Disease Control and Prevention recognizes HIV/AIDS in San Francisco for the first time, marking the start of the AIDS Epidemic.
115	"Crack"	Crack epidemic in the United States	1980s – 1990s	The use of crack cocaine in the United States surges, resulting in increased crime and violence in American inner-city neighborhoods. The government response to the epidemic includes "tough on crime" policies and massively increased incarceration rates, disproportionately affecting African Americans.
116	"Bernie Goetz"	1984 New York City Subway shooting	December 22, 1984	Bernie Goetz shoots four black youths in the New York City Subway after they allegedly try to rob him. The shooting sparks a nationwide debate on race and crime in America, with supporters dubbing Goetz the "Subway Vigilante".
117	"Hypodermics on the shore"	Syringe tide	1987 – 1988	Significant amounts of biomedical waste from the Fresh Kills Landfill, including syringes, wash up on the shores of Connecticut, New Jersey, and New York, forcing beaches along the East Coast of the United States to close.
118	"China's under martial law"	People's Liberation Army at the 1989 Tiananmen Square protests and massacre	May 21 – June 9, 1989	The People's Liberation Army enforces martial law in China during the 1989 Tiananmen Square protests and massacre.
119	"Rock and roller Cola wars"	Cola wars	1970s – 1980s	The long-time rivalry between soft drink producers Coca-Cola and PepsiCo escalated in the 1970s and 1980s, becoming known as the "cola wars". Each side recruited celebrities to endorse its product.
