= Blood in the Water =

Blood in the Water may refer to:

- Blood in the Water match, a water polo match between Hungary and the USSR in 1956
- "Blood in the Water" (CSI: Miami), an episode of CSI: Miami
- Blood in the Water (2009 film), a made-for-TV movie
- Blood in the Water (2016 film), an American thriller film
- Blood in the Water, a 2016 Discovery Channel movie starring Alex Russell
- Blood in the Water (novel), by Gillian Galbraith
- Blood in the Water, a novel in the Destroyermen series by Taylor Anderson
- Blood in the Water: The Attica Prison Uprising of 1971 and Its Legacy a novel by Heather Ann Thompson about the Attica Prison uprising of 1971
- Blood in the Water: Live in San Diego, a live DVD from Megadeth
- Blood in the Water (album), a 2021 album by Flotsam and Jetsam
- "Blood in the Water", a 2020 song by Bon Jovi from 2020
- "Blood in the Water", a musical number from the musical Legally Blonde

== See also ==
- Blood and Water (disambiguation)
