= Blood and Water =

Blood and Water may refer to:

== Publications ==
- Blood and Water (short story collection), by Tim Winton
- Blood & Water, a comic book by Judd Winick and Tomm Coker
- On Earth's Remotest Bounds: Year One: Blood and Water, a novel by Kenneth C. Flint

== Films and Television ==
- Khoon Aur Paani (lit. 'Blood and Water'), a 1981 Indian Hindi-language film
- Blood and Water (Canadian TV series), a 2015 Canadian drama television series
- Blood & Water (South African TV series), a 2020 South African mystery drama television series
- "Blood and Water" (All Saints)
- "Blood and Water" (Ghosts)
- "Blood and Water" (The Shield)
- "Blood and Water," an episode of All Creatures Great and Small

== Other uses ==
- "Blood and Water" (song), by Palm Springs
- The final of Jesus Christ's Holy Wounds

== See also ==
- Blood in the Water (disambiguation)
- Blood Is Thicker than Water (disambiguation)
