= The Neighborhood Watch =

2014 American short film

- Film poster
- Directed by: Christopher Langer
- Written by: Christopher Langer
- Produced by: Christopher Langer
- Starring: Andrew Mittelo; Elliot Lockshine; Anna Jaffe; Anthony T. Mittelo
- Cinematography: Christopher Langer
- Edited by: Christopher Langer
- Production company: Treetower Studios
- Release date: 2014
- Running time: 12 minutes
- Country: United States
- Language: English

The Neighborhood Watch is a 2014 American drama, adventure short film written by Christopher Langer. It went on to the 2015 Ohio Independent Film Festival.

== Plot ==
A kid named Elijah meets a young boy named Sam at block party with his father. Sam tells him about his neighborhood watch and about the training ground for it. Elijah doesn't seem to care until he visits it with Sam and Lucy. Lucy likes Sam and goes missing. Elijah then goes after her by himself.

== Cast ==
- Andrew Mittelo as Elijah
- Elliot Lockshine as Sam
- Anna Jaffe as Lucy
- Anthony T. Mittelo as Don
- Chris Bohan as John
- Lauren Rhodes as Susan
- Nick Farrell as Nick
- Logan Roberts as Logan
