= Strength (Japanese band) =

- Origin: Sendai, Miyagi, Japan
- Genres: Hardcore
- Years active: 1996-2003
- Labels: Handa & Company, No Limit Records, Back Ta Basics

Strength was a Japanese hardcore band formed in Sendai, Japan. They played not only in their hometown Sendai but also in numerous places such as Tokyo and Osaka. They are known as one of the earliest bands who formed the basis of the Sendai hardcore group Merauder.

== Band members ==
- Aniki - vocals (1996–2003)
- You - guitar (1996–2000), now in Cuishlowmath (ex. Inner Struggle)
- Keiji - guitar (1996–2000)
- Katsu - bass (1996–2000), guitar (2000–2003)
- Tadano - drums (1996–2000)
- Shuichi - guitar (2000–2003), ex. Ability
- Yusuke - bass (2000–2003), now in Not One Truth, ex. Break Of Chain, ex. Hard Knock Life
- Daiju - drums (2000–2003), now in Break Of Chain, ex. Hard Knock Life

== Discography ==
Full lengths

- Till Death Do Us Part (1999, Handa & Company)

Demo

- Life Is Pain demo (1996, self-release, cassette)

Splits

- Split 7" with Comin Correct, "No Compromise" (1997, Back Ta Basics, 7")
- "Blood Is Thicker Than Water" with Stinger (1998, Handa & Company / No Limit Records, 7")

Compilation appearances

- Hardcore Ball 2 (1997, Straight Up Records, CD)
- Clench The Fist (1997, CTF Records, 2CD)
- Live Sampler Tape (1998, No Limit Records, cassette)
- Nothing But A Hard Way (1998, Radical East, CD)
- No Limit fanzine Vol.1 Sampler Tape (1998, No Limit Records, cassette)
- Call For Unity vol.3 (2000, Back Ta Basics, CD)
- There Is A Hard Core Making A Entry In 2000 (2000, Straight Up Records, 2CD)
- Mad Dogz (2000, No Limit Records, CD)
- Urban Warfare II-Terror (2001, Impak Musik, CD)
- Tribute To John Holmez (2002, Hardcore Kitchen, CD)
