= Blood in the Water: The Attica Prison Uprising of 1971 and Its Legacy =

2016 book by Heather Ann Thompson

- Author: Heather Ann Thompson
- Language: English
- Subject: Attica Prison riot, Criminal Justice, Law, History, Race
- Genre: Nonfiction
- Publisher: Pantheon
- Publication date: August 2016
- Publication place: United States
- Pages: 752
- Awards: Pulitzer Prize and others
- ISBN: 978-0-375-42322-2 (Hardcover)

Blood in the Water: The Attica Prison Uprising of 1971 and Its Legacy is a nonfiction book about the Attica Prison uprising of 1971 and details not only the events of the week-long uprising and its brutal ending, but also the protracted legal battles that persisted for decades after the event. It is the third book by University of Michigan historian Heather Ann Thompson. Blood in the Water provides a complete history of the incidents at Attica reflecting a decade of research, including information from interviews, government records, personal correspondence, and legal documents, much of which has never been made public before. Thompson argues that the Attica uprising and New York state's response represented shifting American approaches to incarceration and policy. The reverberations of this watershed event has continued to influence America's prison system.

Thompson served as lead historical consultant on the Showtime documentary Attica, released in 2021.

== Book bans in prisons ==
Blood in the Water has been subject to bans in at least eight U.S. state prison systems, in Arizona, Illinois, New Hampshire, New York, North Carolina, Ohio, Texas, and Virginia. The author filed lawsuits against the state prison systems of Illinois and New York on account of the bans. Thompson was represented in the New York case by Cardozo School of Law's Civil Rights Clinic and the New York Civil Liberties Union. The New York State Department of Corrections and Community Supervision lifted its ban in the face of legal pressure in August 2022.

== Critical reception ==
Since its publication in 2016, Blood in the Water has been profiled by media outlets across the U.S., Europe, and Canada, and has received much critical praise. The book was featured and reviewed in three separate sections of The New York Times with one of the reviews calling it a "gripping...remarkable...a superb work of history" while another heralded its research, and the final one, a full-length piece in the NYT Book Review, lauding its passion and power. Reviews in other publications such as Newsweek and The Christian Science Monitor were equally glowing, with the latter calling the book "a masterpiece." The author, Heather Ann Thompson, was herself featured in The New York Times Magazine. A review from NYU's Brennan Center for Justice said that "Thompson’s definitive account should be read by students, historians, and others who are interested not only in the riot itself, but in these larger subjects, and one more: the capacity of our legal system, after the fact, to right wrongs, and provide at least a modicum of justice."

Blood in the Water has won a number of book awards, including the 2017 the Pulitzer Prize for History, the Bancroft Prize in American History and Diplomacy, the Ridenhour Book Prize, the J. Willard Hurst Award in Socio-Legal History, amongst others. Blood in the Water was a 2016 National Book Award for Nonfiction finalist and was on 2016 Top Book lists in The New York Times, Publishers Weekly, Newsweek, and Kirkus Reviews.

=== Awards and honors ===
- Pulitzer Prize in History 2017
- Bancroft Prize in American History and Diplomacy 2017
- Ridenhour Book Prize 2017
- Los Angeles Times Book Prize Finalist 2017
- New York City Bar Association Award 2016
- National Book Award Finalist 2016
- New York Times Most Notable Books of 2016
- Top Ten Best Books of 2016 Publishers Weekly
- Top Ten Best Works of Non-Fiction of 2016 Kirkus Reviews
- Top Ten Books of 2016 Newsweek
- J. Willard Hurst Award in Socio-Legal History 2017
- Finalist Silver Gavel Award for Media and the Arts, Honorable Mention 2017
