= Heather Ann Thompson =

American historian

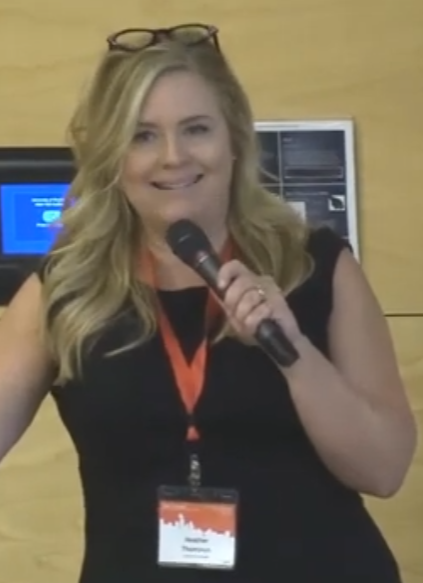
- At LAWCHA Conference 2017
- Born: Lawrence, Kansas, U.S.
- Education: University of Michigan (BA, MA); Princeton University (PhD)
- Occupations: Historian, author
- Website: www.heatherannthompson.com

Heather Ann Thompson is an American historian, author, activist, and professor from Detroit, Michigan. Thompson won the 2017 Pulitzer Prize for History, the 2016 Bancroft Prize, and five other awards for her work Blood in the Water: The Attica Prison Uprising of 1971 and Its Legacy. This book was also a finalist for the Cundill Prize in History as well as the National Book Award and the LA Times Book Award. She is the recipient of several social justice awards as well, including the Life-Long Dedication to Social Justice Award, and the Alliance of Families for Justice and the Regents Distinguished Award for Public Service. She was awarded the Pitt Professorship of American History and Diplomacy in 2019-2020 (University of Cambridge, UK) and received a Guggenheim Fellowship in 2022. Thompson was also named a distinguished lecturer by the Organization of American Historians.

== Early life and family ==
Thompson was born in Lawrence, Kansas. Her early childhood was spent in Bloomington, Indiana, and Oxford, England, but in her teen years the family moved to the North Rosedale Park neighborhood of Detroit, Michigan. Thompson graduated from Cass Technical High School. Thompson's parents are Ann Curry Thompson, a labor lawyer in Detroit, and Frank Wilson Thompson Jr., (1942-2021) a professor of economics at the University of Michigan, who also taught each summer at Harvard University, as well as at other universities internationally. Thompson is married to historian Jonathan Daniel Wells. She has three children.

== Career ==
Thompson earned bachelor's and master's degrees from the University of Michigan and completed her PhD at Princeton University. Thompson was a faculty member at the University of North Carolina, Charlotte, from 1997 to 2009, and then was a faculty member of Temple University in Philadelphia from 2009 to 2015. In 2015, Thompson returned to the Detroit-area when she and her husband accepted faculty positions at the University of Michigan. Thompson writes about the history and current crises of mass incarceration for numerous publications. Her work has been featured in The New York Times, Newsweek, The Washington Post, Jacobin, NBC, Time, The Atlantic, Salon, Huffington Post, and Dissent. She has also appeared on NPR, Sirius Radio, and various television news programs in the U.S. and abroad. Several of Thompson's scholarly pieces, including "Why Mass Incarceration Matters", have won best article awards, and her popular piece in The Atlantic, "How Prisons Change the Balance of Power in America", was named a finalist for the Best Media Award given by the National Council on Crime and Delinquency. Thompson was a Soros justice fellow.

In 2015, Thompson co-founded the Carceral State Project and Documenting Criminalization and Confinement research initiative at the University or Michigan. She has been on the board of numerous organizations, and was a member of the standing Committee in Law and Justice at the National Academies. She served on a National Academy of Sciences blue-ribbon panel to study causes and consequences of incarceration in the U.S. Thompson's books include: Blood in the Water: The Attica Prison Rebellion of 1971 and its Legacy (Pantheon Books, August 2016); Whose Detroit: Politics, Labor and Race in a Modern American City (2001, new edition 2017); and the edited collection, Speaking Out: Protest and Activism in the 1960s and 1970s. She is now completing two new books: the first is a comprehensive history of the Bernhard Goetz Subway Vigilante shootings of 1984 and the second is a long history of the 1985 Philadelphia police of MOVE.

Thompson served as senior historical advisor for the 2026 PBS series Crime and Punishment in America.

=== The Attica uprising of 1971 ===
The culmination of more than a decade of research, Blood in the Water offers the first definitive account of the 1971 Attica Prison riot. The book was released in August 2016 to coincide with the forty-fifth anniversary of the country's largest prison rebellion. The book sheds new light on the riot, the state's violent response, and the decades-long implications of Attica for those involved as well as America's criminal justice system. Thompson's research for the book included interviews with former Attica prisoners, hostages, families of victims, lawyers, judges, law enforcement, and state officials, as well as significant amount of material never before released to the public. Blood in the Water was winner of the Pulitzer Prize in History in 2017. Thompson also served as the lead historical consultant for the documentary Attica, released by Showtime in 2021.

=== History of Detroit and the present-day motor city ===
Thompson's 2001 book, Whose Detroit? Politics, Labor and Race in a Modern American City is a regularly cited account of the history of Detroit during the tumultuous 1960s and 1970s. It is a comprehensive account of police brutality against marginalized groups, and the black political reaction to it in this period, as well as the underlying reasons for why Detroit became such a crucial site of black political activism and black political power after 1973. The book was published by Cornell University Press and a new edition was published in 2017 to mark the 50th anniversary of the Detroit riot of 1967. This updated edition addresses issues currently facing Detroit as well as the city's recent bankruptcy and the current challenges the city faces thanks to record rates of incarceration.

== Publications ==
=== Books ===
- Thompson, Fear and Fury: The Reagan Eighties, the Bernie Goetz Shootings, and the Rebirth of White Rage (Pantheon Books, 2026). ISBN 978-0-593-70209-3.
- Thompson, Blood in the Water: The Attica Uprising of 1971 and its Legacy (Pantheon Books, 2016). ISBN 0375423222.
- Thompson, ed. Speaking Out: Protest and Activism in the 1960s and 1970s (Prentice Hall, 2009). ISBN 9780131942141
- Thompson, Whose Detroit: Politics, Labor and Race in a Modern American City (Cornell University Press, 2001/2017). ISBN 978-1-5017-0921-0

=== Articles ===
- Thompson, "How Attica's Ugly Past is Still Protected", Time, May 26, 2015.
- Thompson, "How Prisons Change the Balance of Power in America", The Atlantic, October 7, 2013.
- Thompson, "Rethinking Working Class Struggle through the Lens of the Carceral State: Toward a Labor History of Inmates and Guards", Labor: Studies in the Working Class History of the Americas (Fall, 2011).
- Thompson, "The Lingering Injustice of Attica", Op-ed, The New York Times, September 9, 2011.
- Thompson, "Why Mass Incarceration Matters: Rethinking Crises, Decline and Transformation in Postwar American History", Journal of American History (December 2010).

== Awards and recognition ==
- Winner Pulitzer Prize in History, 2017.
- Winner Bancroft Prize in American History and Diplomacy, 2017
- Winner Ridenhour Book Prize, 2017.
- Winner J. Willard Hurst Book Prize in Socio-Legal History, 2017.
- Law and Literature Prize, 2017
- Cundill Prize in History, Longlist, 2017.
- Honorable Mention. Silver Gavel Award. American Bar Association. March 2017.
- Finalist Los Angeles Times Book Prize 2017. Blood in the Water: The Attica Prison Uprising of 1971 and its Legacy February 2017. (announcement of award, April 2017)
- Winner. Book Prize. New York City Bar Association. January 2017
- Blood in the Water: The Attica Prison Uprising of 1971 and its Legacy named on 14 "Best Books of 2016" lists, including those compiled by The New York Times, Newsweek, Kirkus Review, The Boston Globe, Publishers Weekly, Bloomberg, the Marshall Project, the Baltimore City Paper, Book Scroll, and the Christian Science Monitor. Additionally, Blood in the Water was named on the Best Human Rights Books of 2016 list, and received starred reviews from Library Journal, Kirkus, and Publishers Weekly.
- Finalist for the National Book Award for Nonfiction 2016. Blood in the Water: The Attica Prison Uprising of 1971 and its Legacy. October 2016
- Finalist, 2015 J. Anthony Lukas Award for Best Work-in-Progress in Non-Fiction, Columbia School of Journalism, March 2015.
- Finalist, 2014 Media for a Just Society Awards for Magazine Article: "How Prisons Change the Balance of Power in America" The Atlantic, National Council for Crime and Delinquency.
- Appointed Distinguished OAH Lecturer, Organization of American Historians, 2013.
- Most Distinguished Scholarly Article Award for "Rethinking Working Class Struggle Through the Lens of the Carceral State: Toward a Labor History of Inmates and Guards", Labor: Studies in Working Class History of the Americas (Fall, 2011). Awarded by the Labor Movements Section. The American Sociological Association.
- Best Article in Urban History Award for "Why Mass Incarceration Matters: Rethinking Crisis, Decline, and Transformation in Postwar American History", Journal of American History (December 2010). Awarded by Urban History Association, 2011.
- Soros Justice Fellowship, The Open Society Institute, 2006-2007.
- Rockefeller Archive Center Research Grant, The Rockefeller Foundation, 2004.
- Research Fellowship, National Endowment for the Humanities, 2000-2001.
