= Neighbourhood Watched =

- Genre: Documentary
- Country of origin: United Kingdom
- No. of series: 3
- No. of episodes: 14

Production
- Production company: Raw Television

Original release
- Network: BBC One
- Release: 4 August 2009 – 1 April 2013

Neighbourhood Watched is a British reality television programme focusing on the lives of Housing Officers and their tenants.

== Episodes ==
=== Series 1 (2009) ===
| No. overall | No. in series | Title | Original release date |
|---|---|---|---|
| 1 | 1 | "Keeping the Peace" | 4 August 2009 |
| 2 | 2 | "Moving On" | 11 August 2009 |
| 3 | 3 | "No Place Like Home" | 18 August 2009 |
| 4 | 4 | "Home Sweet Home" | 25 August 2009 |

=== Series 2 (2011) ===
| No. overall | No. in series | Title | Original release date |
|---|---|---|---|
| 5 | 1 | "The Trouble With Young Men" | 1 March 2011 |
| 6 | 2 | "A New Home" | 8 March 2011 |
| 7 | 3 | "Blood is Thicker than Water" | 15 March 2011 |
| 8 | 4 | "Over-Crowded and Under-Funded" | 22 March 2011 |

=== Series 3 (2012–2013) ===
| No. overall | No. in series | Title | Original release date |
|---|---|---|---|
| 9 | 1 | "Episode 1" | 16 August 2012 |
| 10 | 2 | "Episode 2" | 23 August 2012 |
| 11 | 3 | "Episode 3" | 30 August 2012 |
| 12 | 4 | "Episode 4" | 6 September 2012 |
| 13 | 5 | "Episode 5" | 13 September 2012 |
| 14 | 6 | "Episode 6" | 1 April 2013 |

== Critical reception ==
The programme is critically acclaimed. Neil Midgley of The Daily Telegraph, called the story-telling "a cut above". David Rigby of The Guardian, while noting the housing sector gave it "a mixed reaction", praised the transparency it provided. Rigby called the show "a great advert for the diverse qualities...of landlords".
