= Killing of Jordan Neely =

2023 death in New York City, U.S.

- Right marker: Jordan Neely boarded train at the Second Avenue station. Left marker: Train stopped at the Broadway–Lafayette Street station, in response to Jordan Neely being put in a chokehold before the stop.
- Date: May 1, 2023
- Time: c. 2:30 p.m. (EDT)
- Location: Manhattan, New York City, U.S.
- Type: Homicide by chokehold (Note: A spokesperson for the New York City Office of the Chief Medical Examiner explained that "manner of death was ruled a homicide, but that determination is not a ruling on intent or culpability, which is for the criminal justice system to consider". A pathologist hired by Penny's defense disputed the homicide finding in trial testimony.)
- Filmed by: Juan Alberto Vázquez
- Deaths: Jordan Neely
- Accused: Daniel Penny
- Charges: Second-degree manslaughter (charge dismissed); Criminally negligent homicide
- Verdict: Not guilty on negligent homicide

On May 1, 2023, in New York City, Jordan Neely, a 30-year-old black homeless man, was killed after being put in a chokehold by Daniel Penny, a 24-year-old white United States Marine Corps veteran while riding the New York City Subway. Neely boarded the car Penny was riding and began threatening passengers. After the train left the station, as Neely was threatening passengers, Penny approached Neely from behind to apply the chokehold, and maintained it in a sitting position until Neely went limp a few minutes after the train had reached the next stop. First responders unsuccessfully attempted to revive Neely, who was declared dead after being transported to a hospital. Penny submitted to voluntary questioning at a police precinct office, and was released without charge later the same day.

Two days later, the medical examiner's office ruled that Neely's death was homicide by compression of the neck. A week after that, Penny was charged with second-degree manslaughter and released on bond. He was formally indicted by a grand jury, with a lesser charge of criminally negligent homicide added on June 28. Penny pleaded not guilty to both charges, under which he faced up to 15 years in prison. His trial began in October 2024 and concluded that December. The manslaughter charge was dismissed on the request of the prosecution after the jury deadlocked. He was then acquitted on the remaining charge of criminally negligent homicide. A wrongful death suit by Neely's father remained pending as of September 2025.

Neely's death and Penny's acquittal sparked controversy and division along partisan and racial lines, renewing debates about New York City's treatment of people with similar histories of homelessness and mental illness. Supporters of Penny characterized him as a hero, highlighting his military service, calling him a Good Samaritan and noting he sought to protect other passengers from a dangerous individual. Critics of Penny portrayed him as a vigilante motivated by racism, whom authorities should have immediately arrested and charged with murder, but had not because of white supremacy. Donations to Penny's legal defense totaled nearly $3 million. Neely's criminal record, which included 42 convictions, including assaults, was another source of controversy.

== Incident ==
The incident took place on the New York City Subway in Manhattan. Some time after 2:00 p.m. (EDT) on May 1, 2023, Neely boarded a northbound F train at the Second Avenue station just before it departed for the Broadway–Lafayette Street station. Penny was in the same train car, planning to go to a gym. Independent journalist Juan Alberto Vázquez, whose video of the chokehold was widely distributed by media, told The New York Times that Neely began screaming, "I don't have food, I don't have a drink, I'm fed up. I don't mind going to jail and getting life in prison. I'm ready to die," which other witnesses largely corroborated. Vázquez also said that Neely was frightening but had not assaulted anyone before Penny’s headlock. Other witnesses reported Neely throwing garbage at passengers, and a mother stated that she hid with her child behind a stroller after Neely charged at other passengers. About one minute after Neely boarded it, the train reached Broadway–Lafayette Street station. Most riders exited the car while a few others held open the train doors, preventing the train from leaving the station, and waited for police to arrive.

Statements about the duration of the chokehold vary significantly. Vázquez initially told NBC New York, and posted on Facebook, that the chokehold lasted for 15 minutes, but later told CNN that "the two men were on the floor for about seven minutes" and that he "started recording about three or four minutes after the chokehold began". The video showed Penny continuously applying the hold for at least 3 minutes before releasing Neely. Even so, the 15-minute figure continued to be widely circulated, which Penny disputed at the time, saying it had only lasted 5. In Penny's criminal trial, prosecutors said that the chokehold began less than 30 seconds before the train arrived at the Broadway-Lafayette Street station, and lasted for 6 minutes.

Neely struggled against the chokehold by kicking and trying to free his arms, which were being pinned by two other men. A witness said that it did not look like Penny had control of the situation due to the struggle.

Vázquez said that Penny asked other riders to call the police while he had the chokehold. Penny had learned the technique for restraint in basic training. Another witness said that at some point during the chokehold, Penny relaxed his grip on Neely, and Neely coughed up a wad of blood and mucus. The same witness noted that nobody on the train car was telling Penny to stop his chokehold, and that some passengers expressed hostile statements toward Neely and support for Penny's actions.

At 2:29 p.m., a passenger on the train warned that Neely had defecated on himself, a sign that he may be dying, saying, "You don't want to catch a murder charge. You got a hell of a chokehold, man." One of the other men restraining Neely responded, saying that the excrement on Neely's pants was old. He also responded to the warning by saying that Penny had stopped "squeezing" Neely's neck.

About 50 seconds after Neely became motionless, Penny and one man who was still restraining Neely's arms released their hold on him. Shortly thereafter, a man named Johnny Grima can be seen in the video saying, "Don't put him on his back though, man. He might choke on his own spit." Penny placed Neely on his side, into a recovery position. Grima said that he put water on Neely's forehead, but was told to stop by Penny. Other passengers also checked on him, including an onlooker who warned Penny about killing Neely, who said, "He's all right. He ain't gonna die."

The New York Police Department reportedly received a call at 2:27 p.m. about a fight on the train, and arrived before 2:30 p.m., administering first aid to an unconscious Neely. Another source says the first call was around 2:25 p.m. according to police. The NYPD issued a press release on May 4 which said they had responded at 2:27 p.m. to calls made before that time. The New York City Fire Department received a call for help at 2:39 p.m., arriving at 2:46 p.m. At least five 9-1-1 calls were made, with some initial reports describing a homeless man that some found to be threatening in his mannerisms and volume. An officer arriving at the scene asked how Neely ended up on the floor, and Penny said that he had "put him out". Responding officers testified that Neely had a faint pulse on their arrival, and was initially given Narcan and eventually CPR.

Neely was pronounced dead after being transported to Lenox Hill Hospital.

== People involved ==
=== Jordan Neely ===
Jordan Neely
- Neely posing at the 59th Street–Columbus Circle station in 2011
- Born: Jordan Maurice Caine Neely; December 18, 1992; New York City, U.S.
- Died: May 1, 2023 (aged 30); Manhattan, New York City, U.S.
- Cause of death: Homicide by chokehold (disputed)
- Resting place: Kensico Cemetery
- Education: Bayonne High School
- Known for: Michael Jackson impersonator

Jordan Maurice Caine Neely was a 30-year-old man who grew up in Bayonne, New Jersey. Neely had an extensive criminal record, including 42 arrests for offenses such as petty larceny, theft, jumping subway turnstiles, and assaults. Between 2019 and 2021, he was arrested three times for unprovoked assaults on women in the subway.

Neely was frequently homeless and had a history of mental health issues. In 2007, when he was 14 years old, his mother was murdered by a man with whom she had been in an abusive relationship. Her body was found in a suitcase on the side of the Henry Hudson Parkway. Neely was called to testify at the trial. According to his aunt, Neely developed major depression, schizophrenia, and post-traumatic stress disorder (PTSD) after the murder of his mother. He later was placed in foster care as a youth.

As an adult, Neely was known for his performances as a Michael Jackson impersonator, performing in Times Square and subway stations. He was said to be a talented dancer. According to The Guardian, once Neely became homeless he slipped "into a cycle of mental health crises, arrests and hospitalization that would continue until his death". He had been a client of the Bowery Residents' Committee, which attempted to find him permanent shelter. From 2019 until the time of his death, he was included on what was informally known as the "Top 50 List", a city-maintained roster of homeless people considered to be most in need of assistance and treatment, to which they are often resistant.

Neely's funeral was held on May 19 at Mount Neboh Baptist Church in Harlem. At least 200 people were present, while a small group of peaceful protesters gathered outside. In addition to Neely's family and friends, several Democratic politicians, including Rep. Alexandria Ocasio-Cortez, New York City public advocate Jumaane Williams, and Lt. Gov. Antonio Delgado, also attended.

Civil rights activist and Baptist minister Al Sharpton delivered Neely's eulogy, in which he criticized what he saw as systematic abuse and criminalization of people with mental illness, and double standards of the police and criminal justice system on the basis of race. He objected to the characterization by some of Penny as a "good Samaritan", saying, "A good Samaritan helps those in trouble, they don't choke him out."

Neely was buried at Kensico Cemetery in Westchester County in a private service.

=== Daniel Penny ===
Daniel Penny is a former United States Marine Corps infantry squad leader who attained the rank of sergeant in his four years of service. He was raised in West Islip, Long Island, New York. He was 24 years old the time of the incident, and was studying architecture and engineering at New York City College of Technology. His military combat training included how to render a person unconscious in a non-lethal manner with the chokehold he used on Neely.

Penny joined U.S. president-elect Donald Trump and vice president-elect JD Vance at the 2024 Army–Navy American football game as a "guest of honor" shortly after his acquittal. A few months later, Penny was hired by a prominent Silicon Valley venture capital firm, Andreessen Horowitz, as a "deal partner" in the division of the firm specializing in "aerospace, defense, public safety, education, housing, supply chain, industrials, and manufacturing." Firm outsiders expressed private concerns about Penny's hiring, citing his lack of investment experience and the political controversy surrounding his trial. An internal memo obtained by the newspaper defended his hiring, saying that Penny's military experience would help build relationships with "active-duty military, veterans, chiefs of police, sheriffs" deals within its public safety and defense businesses.

== Legal proceedings ==
=== Investigation and indictment ===
Penny was interviewed by police first responders at the scene, then voluntarily at a precinct office by police detectives later that day. During the recorded interview at the NYPD's 5th Precinct, detectives administered Miranda warnings but did not inform Penny that Neely had died; a homicide detective later testified at trial that Penny was unaware of Neely's death at the time of questioning. Penny told interviewers that Neely entered the train while saying, "I'm gonna kill everybody. I could go to prison forever, I don't care." He demonstrated the hold to the detectives, saying he was only trying to restrain Neely and deescalate the situation, not to kill him. Penny was released without charges a few hours later.

On May 5, 2023, Penny's attorneys released a statement offering his condolences to Neely's family, stating that he "never intended to harm Mr. Neely and could not have foreseen his untimely death" and that "[w]hen Mr. Neely began aggressively threatening Daniel Penny and the other passengers, Daniel, with the help of others, acted to protect themselves, until help arrived." In the same video, Penny repeated what he had told police about Neely's behavior, disputed that he had been motivated by racism, and said that he had not applied the hold for 15 minutes as alleged by Vázquez: "Between stops, it was only a couple of minutes, so the whole interaction, less than five minutes. Some people say I was trying to choke him to death – which is also not true. I was trying to restrain him. You can see in the video there's a clear rise and fall of his chest, indicating that he's breathing."

Three days later, attorneys representing Neely's family released a statement about Penny's press release, saying it "is not an apology nor an expression of regret. It is a character assassination and a clear example of why he believed he was entitled to take Jordan's life ... He never attempted to help him at all. In short, his actions on the train, and now his words, show why he needs to be in prison."

On May 3, Manhattan District Attorney Alvin Bragg confirmed that his office had begun an investigation into Neely's death. Also that day, the medical examiner's office determined the manner of death to be homicide, stating that Neely died from "compression of neck (chokehold)". On May 11, Bragg's office announced that Penny would be charged with second degree manslaughter, which carries a penalty of between five and 15 years in prison. On May 12, Penny turned himself in to police for arrest and was arraigned in Manhattan Criminal Court. Since he had not been indicted by a grand jury, he chose not to enter a plea, and was released from custody on $100,000 cash bail. He was required to surrender his passport and instructed to not leave New York without approval.

A grand jury was impaneled on May 31 and indicted Penny on June 14. At a second arraignment on June 28, the grand jury's indictment was unsealed, revealing a lesser second charge of criminally negligent homicide. A second-degree manslaughter conviction requires the prosecution to prove the defendant knew the potential to cause death, and acted recklessly. A criminally negligent homicide conviction requires proof that the defendant's actions unjustifiably risked Neely's death, but without awareness of the danger.

The two other men who helped to restrain Neely were not charged.

On January 17, 2024, presiding judge Maxwell Wiley declined a defense motion for dismissal, citing the strength of video evidence and the medical examiner's cause of death finding.

=== Criminal trial and acquittal ===
Jury selection began on October 21, 2024, during which nearly all prospective jurors reported having prior knowledge of the incident.

Opening statements began on November 1, with prosecutor Dafna Yoran acknowledging that Penny acted to protect others, calling his intention "laudable" and without obvious intent to kill Neely, but that the chokehold became "unnecessarily reckless" and criminal when Penny maintained it for minutes after Neely had gone limp and ceased to be a threat. In his opening statement, defense attorney Thomas A. Kenniff referred to Neely as "a seething, raging psychotic," whom Penny ignored until Neely menaced a woman protecting her son with a stroller and said, "I will kill." Kenniff also said that Penny had not squeezed Neely's neck with enough force to kill him, and that drugs found in Neely's system and his sickle cell trait may have instead been the cause. Kenniff said that eyewitnesses at the scene and 911 callers did not identify Penny as the aggressor in the incident.

During the trial the prosecution called over 30 witnesses. They argued that Penny ignored signs that Neely was nearing death. They cited grand jury testimony by doctor who had reviewed Vázquez's video of the struggle, who said that Neely exhibited "twitching and the kind of agonal movement that you see around death." Prosecutors also pointed out that near the end of the video a passenger was heard warning Penny, "If you don’t let him go now, you’re going to kill him."

A number of passengers during the incident testified that they were scared of Neely and felt relieved by Penny moving to restrain Neely, including witnesses called by the prosecution. Alethea Gittings said Neely's actions "scared the living daylights out of everybody" and later thanked Penny for his intervention. Gittings and other passengers noted that Neely's actions were more frightening than other outbursts they had witnessed on the subway. Passenger Lori Sitro testified that Neely lunged at people within a foot of their faces, while Dan Couvreur described Neely as having his hands balled into fists. A passenger testified that Neely had made her fear for her life and she believed that he was "most likely armed", although she did not witness him with a weapon. Prosecutors used the witness testimony to assert that Neely did not directly target or hit a rider, or brandish a weapon, whereas defense attorneys stated that the prosecution's own witnesses were making the defense's case for them. 911 calls from passengers were also played in the courtroom, with one passenger relaying that Neely was "trying to attack everybody".

A marine combat instructor, Joseph Caballer, who had trained Penny on the use of several restraining holds, testified for the prosecution that Penny had improperly applied the chokehold. Caballer said that the proper technique is to release the person being restrained once they become unconscious, and that he tells trainees, "You don't want to keep holding on. This can result in actual injury or death." Asked by the defense how much pressure Penny was applying, Caballer answered that he could not exactly say, but that times it appeared Penny "could possibly be cutting off maybe one of the carotid arteries." Jurors were shown a video of Penny demonstrating the technique to detectives during questioning at the precinct station on the day of the incident. In the video, Penny said, "He had his back turned to me and I got him in a hold, got him to the ground, and he’s still squirming around and going crazy. He gets a burst of energy at one point and I did have to hold him a little more steady." In the same interview when asked if he had been applying pressure, Penny answered, "No, I didn't, I wasn't, I just wanted to keep him from getting to people."

A pathologist hired by the defense as an expert witness, Satish Chundru, testified that "the combined effects" of synthetic marijuana, schizophrenia, sickle cell trait, and Neely's exertion during the restraint, caused his death. Chundru said that the location and amount of bruising on Neely's neck, and the small number of petechiae (small red spots caused by burst blood vessels) on his eyelids, were inconsistent with Neely being choked to death.

Prosecutors argued that some details of Chundru's testimony—including his statements about petechiae—were at odds with his own prior testimony in other cases; Chundru said that those cases were not comparable. The prosecution also cited the American Society of Hematology, a professional organization whose members treat blood disorders such as sickle cell trait, which has said that deaths attributed to sickle cell crisis "must be viewed with profound skepticism."

The city medical examiner who performed Neely's autopsy, Cynthia Harris, said that Chundru's assessment was "profoundly improbable," and that "consensus was unanimous" in her department that Neely died from asphyxia caused by the chokehold. She testified that sudden deaths from sickle cell crisis are "exceptionally rare," typically take hours to a day rather than being "instantaneous," and that the sickling observed in Neely's autopsy was likely caused by the chokehold. Harris added that video evidence of Neely's face turning purple, with bulging veins, indicated restricted blood flow between his head and body, and that the duration of the chokehold applied to Neely "would have killed anyone" by asphyxia.

The defense challenged Harris's decision to issue the cause of death without waiting for toxicology reports which showed the presence of K2, a synthetic cannabinoid, in Neely's system. She said that the video evidence showing Neely unresponsive prompted her to issue her finding. She also testified that K2 is "two to 100 times more potent to standard natural occurring cannabinoids," but that testing can only detect the presence of the drug, not the quantity, because synthetic cannabinoids "change like fashion trends."

Closing arguments were delivered on December 2, 2024. On December 3, jury deliberations got underway. Jurors were instructed to consider the top charge of manslaughter before considering the charge of criminally negligent homicide. They were also instructed to determine whether Penny's actions were responsible for Neely's death, and if so, whether his actions were reckless and unjustified. During deliberation, jurors sent over 10 notes to the judge for further instructions. After a jury deadlock emerged on the manslaughter charge, Judge Wiley gave jurors Allen charge instructions, requesting that they reconsider differing opinions to reach an agreement.

On December 6, prosecutors successfully requested a dismissal of the manslaughter charge against Penny following the jury deadlock, which cleared the jury to deliberate on the lower charge of criminally negligent homicide. Penny was found not guilty of the remaining charge of criminally negligent homicide on December 9.

After his acquittal, Penny said he found Neely to be "extraordinarily strong", was worried about Neely attacking him or someone else if he let go, and that he would take the same course of action again.

=== Civil lawsuit ===
On December 5, a wrongful death suit was filed into the New York Supreme Court by Jordan Neely's father, Andre Zachary, on the grounds of negligence, assault, and battery.

== Reactions and protests ==
=== Neely's family and friends ===
Neely's father, Andre Zachery, spoke with the New York Daily News on May 5, 2023, stating, "Obviously he was calling for help ... He wasn't out to hurt nobody. He was a good kid and a good man too. Something has to be done. That man, he's still walking around right now. My son didn't deserve to die because he needed help." The family asked Al Sharpton to deliver the eulogy at Neely's funeral. However, as a father, Zachery was mostly uninvolved in Neely's life throughout his childhood, according to a 2023 New York Magazine profile of Neely.

Moses Harper, a dance instructor and performer and a friend and mentor of Neely from age 16 until his death said, "when I think of Jordan Neely, I think of a gifted, kind, young soul who was trying to find some joy and peace in this world. He was looking for a reason to celebrate and engage in something positive. And it is painful to think that somebody treated him like he wasn't worth anything. He was priceless." Based on her years of outreach work at Rikers Island, Harper said that younger homeless men like Neely were frequently counseled by their elders to intentionally commit minor offenses for the purpose of getting a warm meal and bed in jail, or claim suicidal ideation to gain hospital admission, when no other options were available. The last time Harper saw Neely alive, she encouraged him to "get clean and clean up." Neely said, "Don't worry, I am going to do it." "But the system failed Jordan," said Harper.

=== Public officials and community ===
New York City mayor Eric Adams called Neely's death "tragic" and said "there's a lot we don't know about what happened here", and that Neely's mental health issues played a role in the killing. Later, without mentioning the circumstances of Neely's death, Adams said that death could have been prevented if Neely had received more mental health assistance. When asked about the issue of vigilantism in a May 4 interview with Abby Phillip, Adams replied that "we cannot blanketly tell passengers what they should or should not do". Adams later held a press conference calling for passage of the proposed Supportive Interventions Act, a bill that would lower the legal threshold at which a person can be involuntarily committed in New York.

New York Governor Kathy Hochul called Neely's death "deeply disturbing" and called for "consequences". She described Penny's actions as a "very extreme response" to a person who did not appear to be a threat to others. Metropolitan Transportation Authority chair Janno Lieber called the death "really troubling and upsetting" and urged riders to "find a way to deescalate" if challenges emerge on the subways.

State Senator Julia Salazar called Neely's killing a lynching, arguing that Neely would not have been perceived as threatening if he were not black, referencing news and social media coverage demonizing the homeless and mentally ill. She tweeted, "The constant demonization of poor people and people in mental health crisis in our city allows for this barbarism. It is making our city sick." Executive director of the Coalition for the Homeless, Dave Giffen, said that political rhetoric has led to hatred and violence against homeless people. City Council member Tiffany Cabán said the killing was "the inevitable outcome of the dangerous rhetoric of stigmatizing mental health issues, stigmatizing poverty and the continued bloated investment in the carceral system at the expense of funding access to housing, food and health".

Many left-leaning activists, including Democratic Party representative Alexandria Ocasio-Cortez, said Neely was murdered, pointing to what they say are deficiencies in the city's response to homelessness and mental illness. Ocasio-Cortez tweeted: "Jordan was houseless and crying for food in a time when the city is raising rents and stripping services to militarize itself." She accused the Adams administration of "trying to cut the very services that could have helped" Neely. New York City comptroller Brad Lander said, "We must not become a city where a mentally ill human being can be choked to death by a vigilante without consequence."

Mayor Adams rebuffed statements from Lander and Ocasio-Cortez as "[not] very responsible at the time where we're still investigating the situation" and called for officials to wait on investigations from Bragg and law enforcement officials.

Other officials expressed frustration that DA Bragg's office had not already criminally charged Penny, claiming that if he had been black, the situation would have unfolded differently. City Council speaker Adrienne Adams stated, "The initial response by our legal system to this killing is disturbing and puts on display for the world the double standards that black people and other people of color continue to face."

New York City media reported that residents were divided, with some supporting and others opposing Penny's actions. More than 59,000 online donations have been made to Penny's legal defense fund, totaling around $2.9 million, including $10,000 from Vivek Ramaswamy, with some conservatives – including Republican politicians Ron DeSantis and Matt Gaetz – labeling him a hero and celebrating his actions. Republican politician Nikki Haley was very critical of the DA charging Penny, and said "the governor needs to pardon Daniel Penny ... no question about it [...] right away". Republican Nassau County, New York, executive Bruce Blakeman held a rally in support of Penny in Manhattan.

On May 25, Republican politician Andy Ogles proposed House Resolution 448 in the United States House of Representatives to "recognize and honor Daniel Penny ... for his heroism and courage in apprehending a threat to public safety". The resolution was supported by Marjorie Taylor Greene and other Republican representatives. The text of the resolution made reference to Neely's arrest record. On the same day, Ogles wrote on Twitter, "In Democrat-run cities across the nation, crime is rampant, and the desperate cry for order is loud. Rather than take action to protect everyday citizens, Leftist government leaders prioritize political agendas over justice." Tennessee State Rep. Gloria Johnson responded to the resolution on Twitter, saying, "Maga republicans sure love criminals." No further action was taken to advance the resolution.

Former NYC prosecutor Michael Bachner told NBC New York that Penny's status as a Marine veteran could undermine an argument he acted in self-defense, saying, "If he knew and was trained to use a chokehold, he would be no different than the training a police officer would get. The argument is going to be that he acted in a way that he should have known could result in death."

Shortly after Neely's death, Gabriel Murphy, a former marine with a service record similar to Penny's, started a petition at MoveOn saying, "the individual who choked Mr. Neely to death should be prosecuted for murder." As of May 9, 2023, nearly 6,000 people had signed it. Murphy said that Penny had misused the technique and that, "I don't think what he did was OK, and I don't think it's in line with anything the Marine Corps teaches." Former marine blackbelt Alex Hollings said in a June 28 interview with Insider that Penny was "sloppy and excessive" in his application of the chokehold, but that marine training doesn't "place a heavy emphasis on knowing when to let up to ensure your opponent survives." Three other marine veterans were interviewed for the article, including two retired senior officers. There was disagreement among them as to whether Penny's actions were reckless or negligent; one of the former officers called him a hero.

=== Journalists ===
About a month after Neely's death, reporter Andy Newman, who had covered the Neely story for The New York Times, gave an interview to the Columbia Journalism Review. He said that he found the issues of homelessness and mental illness "vexing to write about" because they lack easy solutions, and that he thought many readers feel or assume that the answer is to "just get these people to take their meds, and or just lock them away in a long-term psychiatric institution." Reflecting on his 25 years at the metro desk, he said:

The depressing thing about covering this stuff is that if you just look back at stories through the years, every single mayor has tried ways to fix this problem and to somehow prevent people who are severely mentally ill and maybe prone to violence from doing something terrible to other people or to themselves. And every mayor and every governor comes in with a bunch of plans and programs. And we write these stories about these plans and programs. And for one reason or another, it just always happens again.

HuffPost reporter Matt Shuham wrote that local and national media villainized Neely almost immediately following his death by highlighting his history of homelessness and mental illness, as well as publishing details of his criminal record:

That record included dozens of arrests, some for assault and many for lesser charges like fare evasion. And police sources appeared to immediately leak Neely's rap sheet to news outlets after his death, despite Neely having just been killed in public. The practice of leaking criminal records to reporters after a public incident is a habit for the NYPD, deployed after the arrests of countless defendants – but not usually for homicide victims.

=== Protests ===
Protestors chant "Say his name: Jordan Neely!" as they walk down Madison Avenue on May 6.

On May 3, two days after Neely's killing, a vigil-turned-protest was held inside the Broadway–Lafayette Street station, during which the arrest and charging of the then-unnamed man who choked Neely were demanded. A protest in front of the Manhattan district attorney's office was set for May 4, and another May 4 protest was held in Brooklyn; after dark on May 4, a group of demonstrators marched from Brooklyn to Manhattan across the Manhattan Bridge, onto which they spray-painted slogans related to Neely's death. Several organizations, including Black Lives Matter, NAACP, and Amnesty International USA, have called for accountability in Neely's killing. On May 5, 2023, protests took place across the city, including locations such as the Broadway–Lafayette Street station, Washington Square Park, and outside the Manhattan district attorney's office, calling for criminal charges to be brought. Protests were again held on May 6, 2023, at various locations in Manhattan, including the Lexington Avenue–63rd Street station, where several protesters were arrested. On May 8, 2023, 11 protesters were arrested.

On June 23, the Manhattan district attorney's office dropped all misdemeanor charges related to the protests, which included resisting arrest and disorderly conduct. The office said that it was still seeking to prosecute three people who were arrested on felony charges, one for blocking subway tracks, one for pinning an NYPD inspector's arm in a door, causing "bruising and substantial pain", and one for striking the back of an officer's head multiple times.

== See also ==
- 1984 New York City Subway shooting – Shooting of four Black teenagers by Bernhard Goetz
- 2022 New York City Subway attack – Mass shooting in New York, U.S.
