= Plano Senior High School =

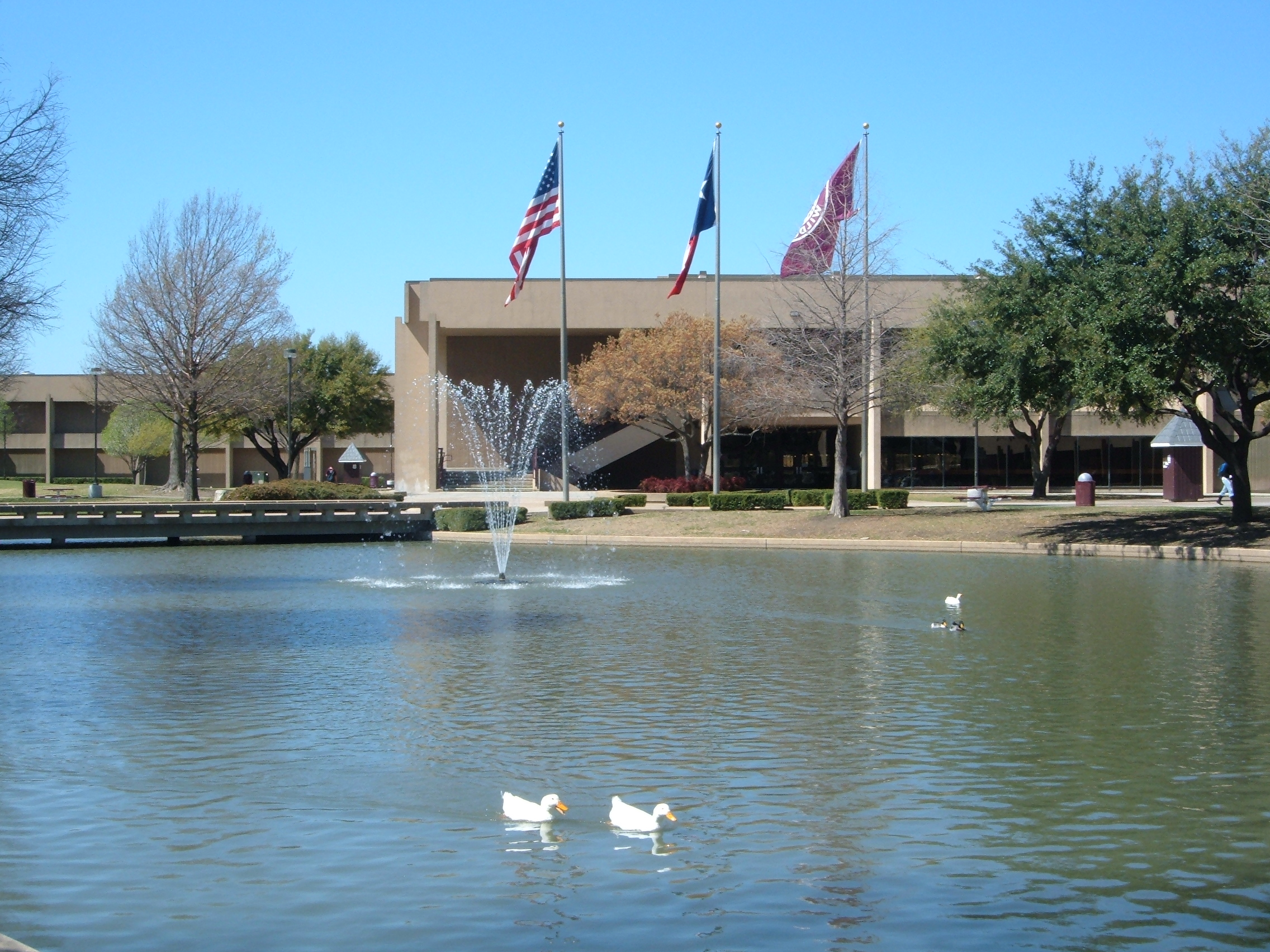
- The pond at Plano Senior High School

Location
- 2200 Independence Parkway; Plano, Texas 75075; United States; 33.0281°N 96.7510°W

Information
- School type: Public high school
- Motto: A Tradition of Excellence
- Established: 1891
- School district: Plano Independent School District
- CEEB code: 445565
- NCES School ID: 483510003969
- Principal: Kennitra Robertson
- Teaching staff: 134.95 (on FTE basis)
- Grades: 11 to 12
- Enrollment: 2,267 (2024–2025)
- Student to teacher ratio: 16.80
- Campus size: 96 acres (39 ha)
- Campus type: Suburban
- Colors: Maroon; White
- Mascot: Wildcat
- Accreditations: Texas Education Agency, Southern Association of Colleges and Schools
- Website: https://pshs.pisd.edu
- References

Plano Senior High School (commonly Plano, Plano Senior High, or PSHS) is a public secondary school in Plano, Texas, serving students in grades 11–12. The school is part of the Plano Independent School District, with admission based primarily on the locations of students' homes. Plano is a two-time Blue Ribbon School and a Texas Exemplary School. Students at Plano Senior typically attended one of two feeder high schools: Clark or Vines.

Founded in 1891 as Plano Public School, serving both primary and secondary students, the school was, by the mid-1910s, sending a majority of its graduating students on to college. Plano High School, created in 1952 by separating the primary students into Mendenhall Elementary School, was immediately accredited by the Southern Association of Colleges and Schools, allowing its graduates to enter college without taking an entrance exam. In 1964, Plano High School integrated with the Frederick Douglass School (formerly Plano Colored School), and the integrated football team won the first of the school's seven state championships in 1965. In 1975, the school moved to a new 96-acre (39 ha) campus with five buildings, very similar to the layout of a junior college, where it has remained since. The old building is now the T. H. Williams High School, serving 9th and 10th grade. During the first year only at the new campus, PSHS served 10th – 12th grade, making the Class of 1978 the only class to attend school at this campus for three years.

The school is accredited by the Texas Education Agency as well as the Southern Association of Colleges and Schools. Plano was ranked in the top 2,000 high schools in the United States in 2013. Plano's mascot is the Wildcat. In 2013 Plano was ranked 117th in Newsweek's review of America's Best High Schools.

As of the 2012–2013 school year, the school had an enrollment of 2,627 students and 149.54 classroom teachers (on an FTE basis), for a student-teacher ratio of 17.57:1.

== History ==
=== Plano Public School ===
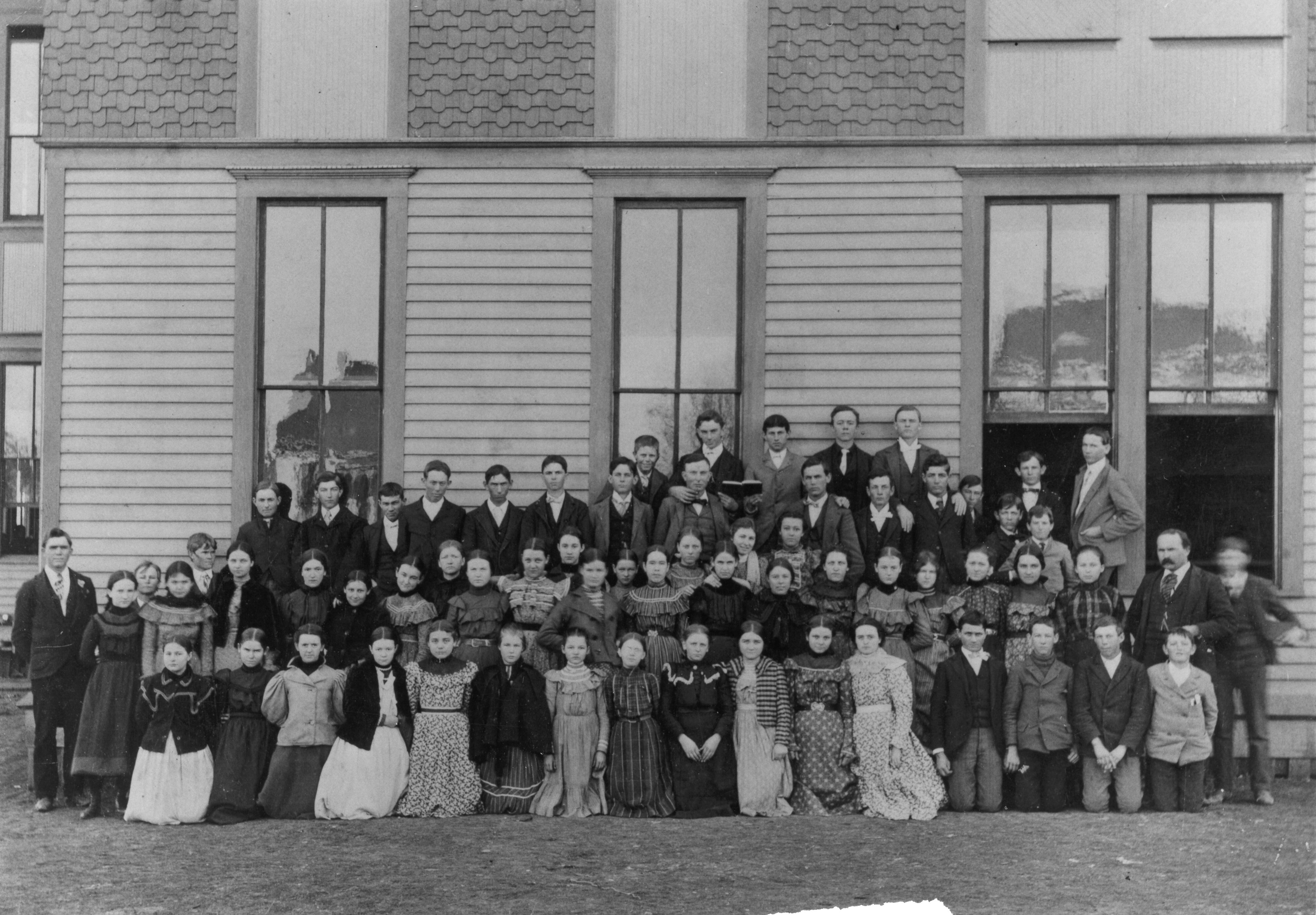
All of the pupils of the Plano Public School standing outside the building in 1898

In the 19th century, various private institutions existed within Plano for the education of children. One of these, the Plano Institute, was a private school founded in 1882 that offered an Artium Baccalaureatus degree. On June 9, 1891, the people of Plano determined by a vote that the city should assume control of the schools. In July of that same year, the citizens approved a fifty cent tax for school purposes and for the purchase of the Plano Institute's land and building. The building was used for the new Plano Public School, from which Plano Senior High School would develop. Thus, 1891 is generally considered the school's foundation year. The original school grounds would later become the Cox Administration Building. In 1892, Plano graduated its first class of five people.

In 1899, the Plano Independent School District became a separate entity from the city. Because of this separation, 1899 is cited by the district as the establishment date for Plano Senior High School. Starting in 1901, the school was affiliated with the University of Texas, Baylor, Texas A&M, and Southwestern in order to ensure that graduates could secure entrance to college. Unfortunately for students, official affiliations eventually ended due to budget restrictions. However, the affiliations, coupled with the high standards of Plano schools, led to a large number of graduating students going on to attend college. By the mid-1910s, a majority of the graduating class (as much as eighty percent) matriculated to an institute of higher learning, such as the University of Texas at Austin or Baylor University. According to the 1915 Plano Review, "The University of Texas probably draws more students from Plano than any one other institution." The Review goes on to state that "no town in Texas, in proportion to its size, has more students in higher institutions of learning than Plano."

The original building burned down in 1894 and was reconstructed on the same site. The rebuilt Plano Public School again burned down in the spring of 1903, leading to the construction of yet another new building. The students went to classes in the local Opera House until the completion of the new building, often called the "Spanish School" because of its Moorish architecture. Following its construction, the district built various new facilities to support its students, including a new band hall, gymnasium, and auditorium.

Plano Public School's Auditorium, built in 1938 by the WPA

In 1922, the Texas Department of Education informed the district that the Spanish School was "inadequate ... for high school work." By 1924, the district had constructed a new building to house the Plano Public School. In 1935, while the country was in the midst of the Great Depression, the WPA offered to build the district a much-needed new gym. The US$125,000 ($2859042.55 according to inflation) building, completed in 1938, was used as a gym, auditorium, classroom, and laboratory, allowing new subjects to be taught, including agriculture, business, and home economics. At the time, Texas required that students complete 16 credits, or full semester courses, to graduate. This expansion allowed Plano students a choice of 30 credits with which to fulfill the requirement.

=== Plano High School ===
In September 1952, Mendenhall Elementary School was created, allowing primary students to be separated from secondary students. That same year, the newly created Plano High School was accredited by the Southern Association of Colleges and Schools, allowing its graduates to enter college without taking an entrance exam. In 1961, Plano High School moved to a new location on the east side of town, now the site of Williams High School, and the new building was constructed at a cost of $993,590 (6.2 million 2005 dollars).

Following the 1954 U.S. Supreme Court decision Brown v. Board of Education, the Plano school board considered the issue of integrating Plano High School with Plano Colored High School. The school board formed a committee of "colored citizens" to address the concern. Twice, in 1955 and 1957, when asked if they favored integration, the citizens on the committee stated they "were perfectly happy with their school and would like to be left alone." In 1964, the issue was raised again when the school board voted to let students of the Plano Colored School, by then renamed the Frederick Douglass School, decide if they wanted to integrate with Plano High School. The students voted to integrate, and Douglass School became a primary facility. The 1964–1965 football team, the first integrated team for the school, won the first state championship in school history, helping to ease racial tensions. By 1968, Douglass School was closed. The Texas Education Agency later praised the district for its handling of integration, calling it "an exceptional job."

=== Plano Senior High School ===
In the 1970s, in response to massive growth and with a desire to lower dropout rates and increase college readiness, then Superintendent H. Wayne Hendrick began a search for a new way to organize the school system. After touring several successful systems across the country, including those in Flint, Michigan; Cherry Creek, Colorado; Evanston, Illinois; and Hillsboro, Oregon, Hendrick found none of their systems suitable for Plano's needs. He instead decided to create a new senior high system. While the majority of American high schools serve students from grades nine through twelve, Plano's high schools serve only ninth and tenth graders, while senior high schools serve eleventh and twelfth graders. Two high schools feed into each senior high school, such as Plano Senior High. This system allows students to complete most of their required credits in high school and specialize with vocational classes at the senior high. Plano Senior High students currently feed from Vines and Clark High Schools.

== Campus ==
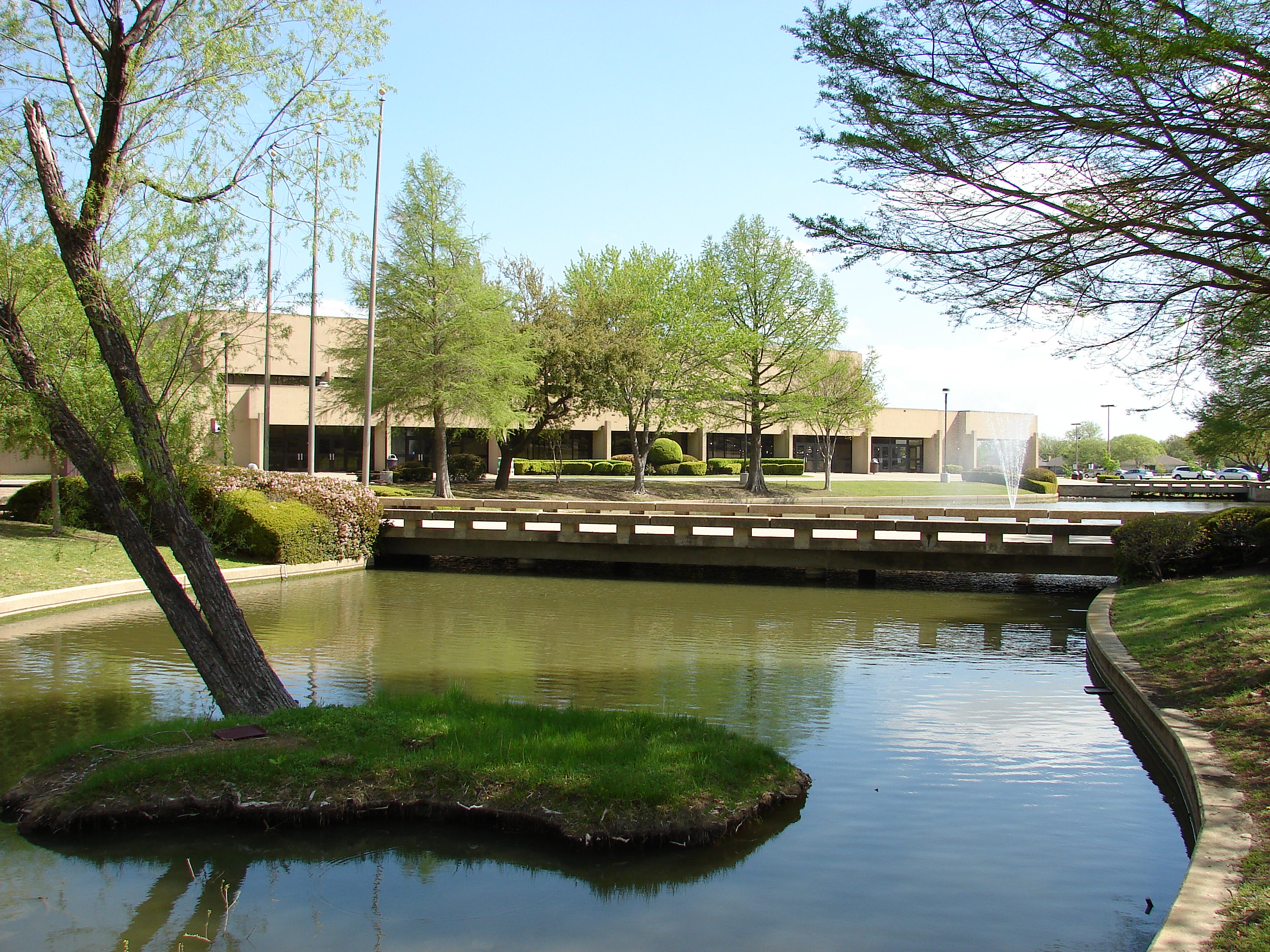
PSHS campus, facing Northeast

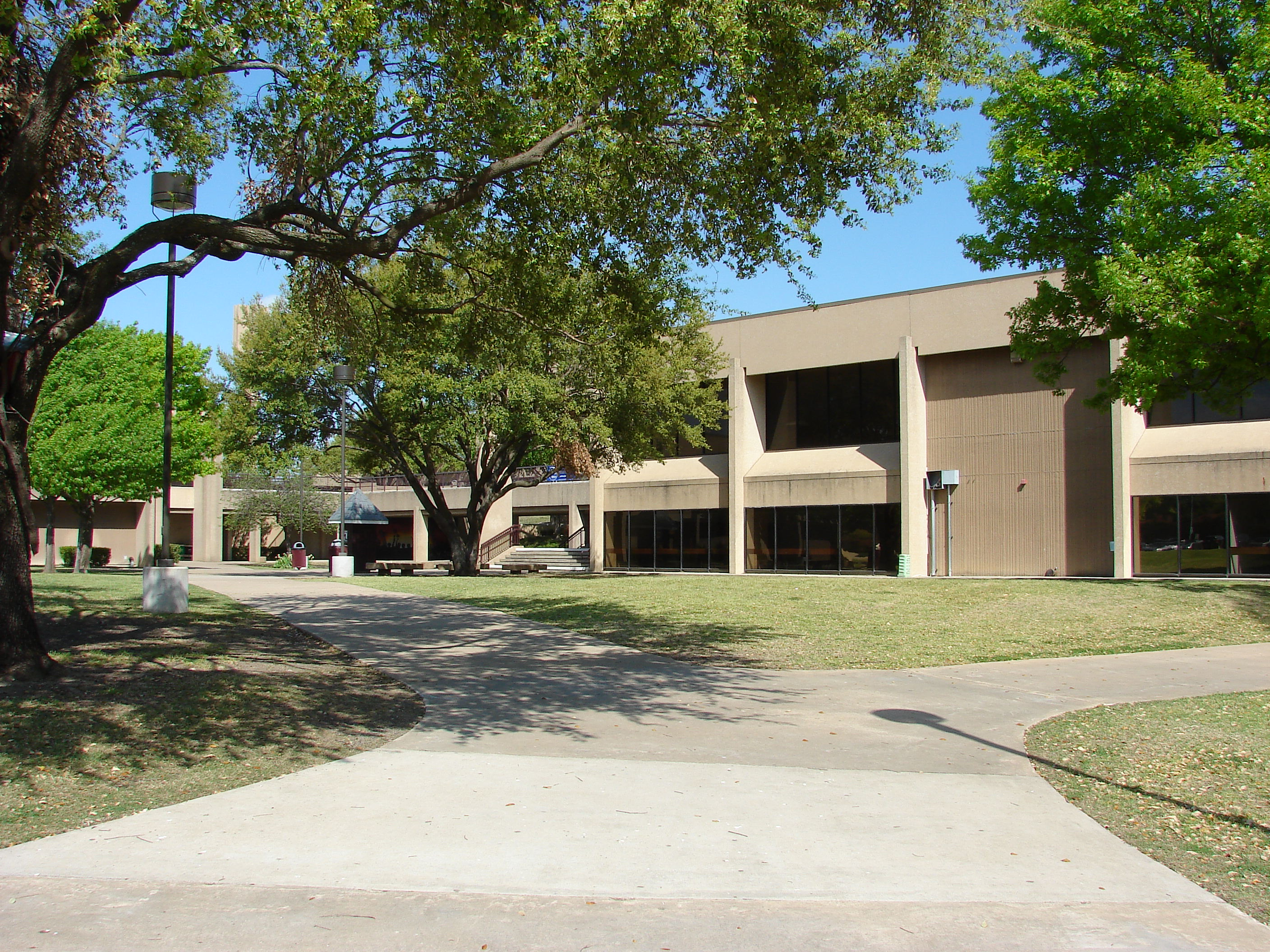
PSHS campus, facing Northwest

The current campus dates from 1975. The plan created a 96-acre (39 ha) site with five buildings, very similar to the layout of a junior college. The campus consisted of six buildings with the addition in 2002 of an indoor workout facility (Student Activity Center), which has since been replaced. The buildings are interconnected by greenspace, which features a man-made pond as the central element. The campus was constructed at a cost of 10.3 million U.S. dollars (62.8 million 2025 dollars). The school opened for the 1975–1976 school year with only two buildings completed. By Christmas of 1975, all five buildings were completed, and the school was dedicated on March 7, 1976. The new senior high school offered a broad variety of studies previously unseen in the district. The new facility offered courses in social studies, drama, art, and journalism as well as vocational studies in clothing design, professional childcare, air conditioning repair, and metalworking.

Due to high population growth rates in Plano, Plano East Senior High School opened to juniors in 1981 to alleviate overcrowding. And in 1999, Plano West Senior High School opened to juniors for the same purpose.

In 2002, Plano completed an $18 million renovation, making ADA compliance upgrades, and renovations to the science department, HVAC, fire sprinkler, and security systems, and site lighting. Additions constructed between 2010 and 2011 expanded fine arts and added science classrooms.

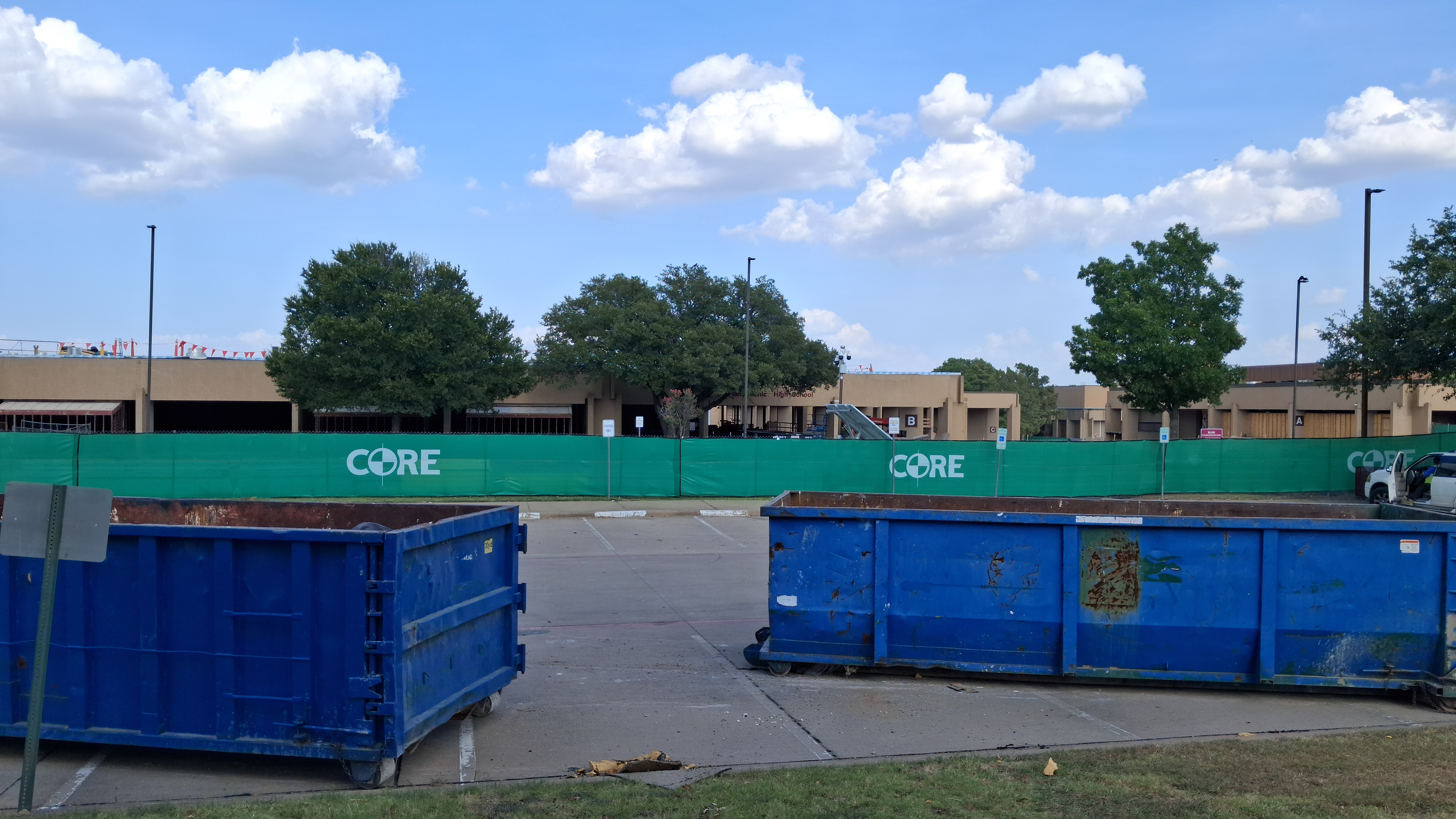
Reconstruction of Plano Senior High School on July 30 2026

As of 2026, the campus was undergoing major renovations and additions as part of Plano ISD's 2022 bond program. Planned changes include a new cafeteria, library, and front entrance, with expected completion in 2029. The old Haggard Middle School is planned to temporarily become Building H once its replacement is complete, while academic areas at Plano Senior High School are renovated. The school has completed a new athletics fields complex and band practice field.

== Demographics ==
In the 2012–2013 school year, the demographic breakdown of the 2,627 students enrolled, was:

- Male – 49.4%
- Female – 50.6%
- Native American/Alaskan – 0.2%
- Asian/Pacific islander – 22.6%
- Black – 6.9%
- Hispanic – 13.3%
- White – 53.5%
- Multiracial – 3.5%

== Academics ==
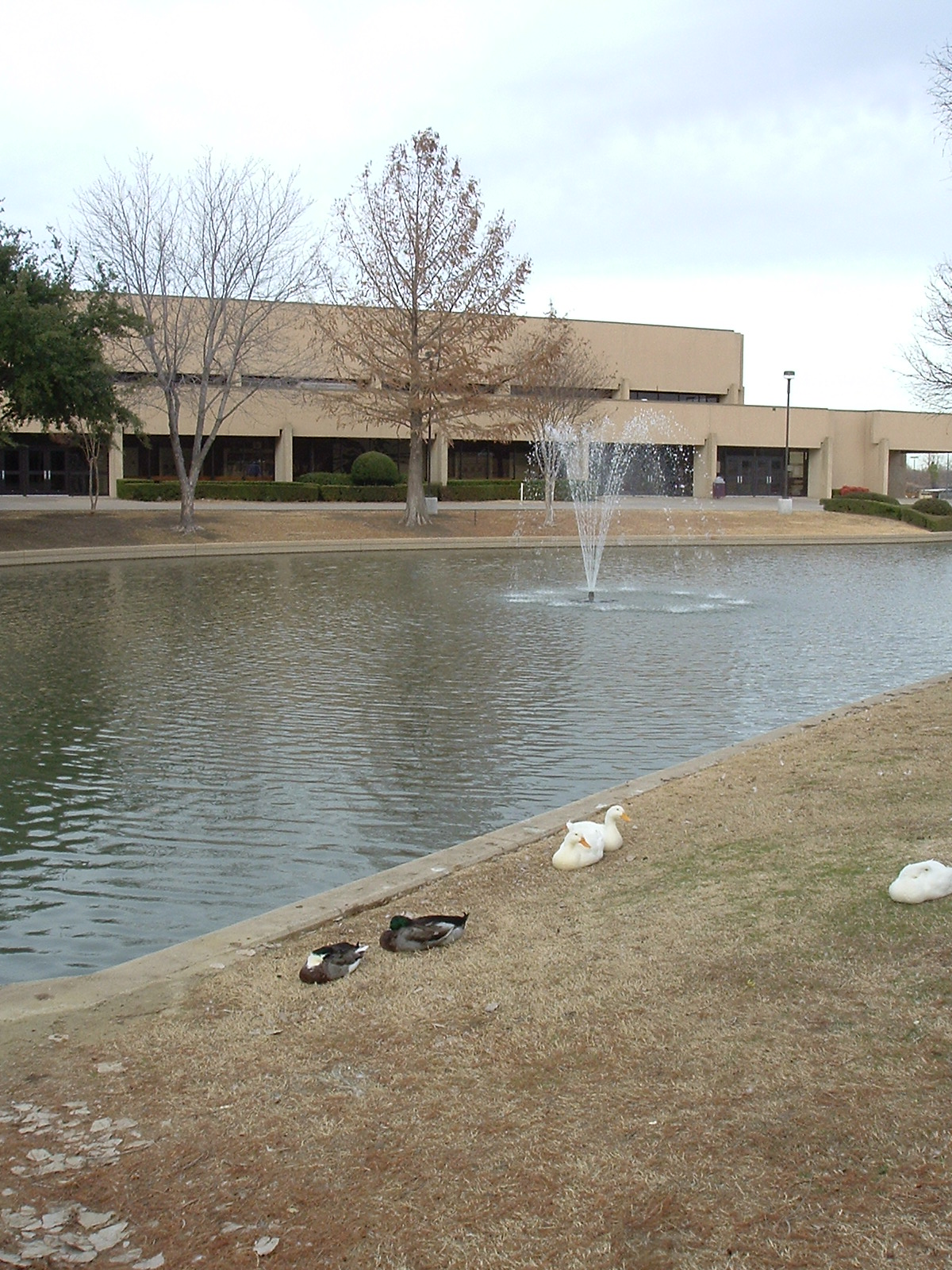
Ducks that inhabit the area around the pond have inspired a yearly "Duck Week" celebration every spring on campus.

The school also offers many vocational courses, as was Superintendent Hendrick's intent when it was built. Plano currently offers vocational courses including those in agriculture, family and consumer science, journalism, fashion design, advertising design, drafting, automotive technology, automotive paint and body, clinical rotation, and criminal justice.

Plano was named a National Blue Ribbon School in the 1984–85 school year and again from 1994 to 1996. In the 2007 graduating class, 97% of graduates went on to college or university: 80% went on to four-year universities, while 17% went to two-year colleges. Students in the class achieved an average composite SAT score of 1163 out of 1600 and a mean composite ACT score of 24.7 out of 36. Many Plano students received National Merit Scholarship accolades in the 2007 school year, including 46 finalists, 54 semi-finalists, and 62 commended students. These individual class statistics are indicative of previous years' performances.

== Extracurricular activities ==
The extracurricular activities offered at Plano Senior High School are many and varied due to the school's large size. There are chapters of national organizations, such as the National Honor Society, and clubs founded by Plano students, such as Acoustical Word, in which students play guitar and recite poetry. Service organizations such as Key Club coexist alongside clubs which have a primarily social or recreational purpose. The usual range of athletic and music organizations are there for students to join, in addition to Plano's other clubs.

Plano Senior High School teams currently compete in UIL competitions in District 6 of the 6A Class, the class designated for the largest schools. For the 2008–2010 school years, Plano competed in District 8-5A.

Plano's 2007 enrollment for competitive purposes is officially listed as 5240. This is the number used by the UIL when determining what other schools Plano competes against in all UIL-sponsored athletic and academic competitions. This number exceeds the on-site enrollment of Plano Senior High because the official enrollment of each senior high school also includes the enrollment of each of its feeder schools. Ninth and tenth graders who are good enough to compete at the varsity level of a sport may be bused to the senior high school to compete in varsity sports, therefore becoming part of the senior high's talent pool. The number can be fractional because Jasper High School, one of Plano's feeder schools, is also a feeder school for Plano West Senior High School, and therefore the enrollment is split.

=== Academic Decathlon ===
The 2006 Plano Senior High Academic Decathlon team celebrating after placing second overall at the USAD National Finals

The 2006 state champion Plano Academic Decathlon team represented Texas at the national competition in San Antonio, Texas, placing second. The team won 30 medals in subject, overall, and team scores.

=== Speech and Debate ===
At the 2005 National Forensic League national tournament, the Plano Senior Speech Team received School of Excellence awards in both the Speech and Debate categories, one of only three schools that year to do so. The team also won the 2005 national title at the Princeton University tournament. At the 2007 National Speech Tournament, Plano students won the sixth place Sweepstakes Trophy. In 2006 and 2009, the school finished 2nd in the annual National Public Policy Forum (NPPF) debate tournament held in New York City and hosted by the Bickel & Brewer law firm and New York University. In 2011, the school finished 1st in the same competition gone international (the IPPF) hosted by Bickel & Brewer and NYU.

=== Athletics ===
==== Basketball ====
The Plano boys' basketball victory was broadcast to a broad audience across the southwest United States on FSN Southwest on March 11, 2006.

The Plano boys' basketball team, which has existed as long as the football team, has taken only three trips to the state championships. After losses in the 1952 and 1980 championships against Dimmitt and Houston Kashmere, respectively, Plano did not return to the tournament again until 2006. On March 11, 2006, the boys' basketball team won the school's first state basketball championship in overtime against Humble Kingwood High School at the Frank Erwin Center in Austin. The game was broadcast across the southwest United States by regional carrier FSN Southwest, and in turn nationally by Fox's digital cable network, Fox College Sports Central.

The girls basketball team has played in one 5A championship, losing to Mansfield High School 69–43 in 2000.

Boys Basketball State Championship Games
Year	Winning Team		Losing Team		Location (all in Texas)	Class
1952	Dimmitt	62	Plano	40	Gregory Gymnasium, Austin	A
1980	Houston Kashmere	70	Plano	69	Frank Erwin Center, Austin	4A
2006	Plano	60	Humble Kingwood	58	Frank Erwin Center, Austin	5A

==== Football ====
The football team has played in nine state championship games and has won seven.

Boys Football State Championship Games
Year	Winning Team		Losing Team		Location (all in Texas)	Class
1965	Plano	20	Edna	17	Nelson Field, Austin	2A
1967	Plano	27	San Antonio Randolph	8	Baylor Stadium, Waco	2A
1971	Plano	21	Gregory-Portland	20	Memorial Stadium, Austin	3A
1977	Plano	13	Port Neches-Groves	10	Texas Stadium, Irving	4A
1978	Houston Stratford	29	Plano	13	Astrodome, Houston	4A
1986	Plano	24	La Marque	7	AT&T Stadium, Arlington	5A
1987	Plano	28	Houston Stratford	21	Memorial Stadium, Austin	5A
1993	Converse Judson	36	Plano	13	Baylor Stadium, Waco	5A Div 1
1994	Plano	28	Katy	7	Kyle Field, College Station	5A Div 1

==== Soccer ====
The boys' soccer team has played in seven state championship games and the girls' soccer team has played in six. The boys' team has emerged victorious six times, and the girls' four.

Boys Soccer State Championship Games
Year	Winning Team		Losing Team		Location (all in Texas)	Class
1991	Plano	4	Klein	2		5A
1992	Plano	1	Grapevine	0		5A
1993	Plano	3	El Paso Hanks	1		5A
1995	Plano	3	Katy Mayde Creek	0		5A
1996	El Paso Coronado	3	Plano	2		5A
2000	Plano	3	Katy Taylor	0		5A
2009	Plano	3	Brownsville Lopez	1		5A

Girls Soccer State Championship Games
Year	Winning Team		Losing Team		Location (all in Texas)	Class
1986	Plano	2	Duncanville	1		5A
1987	Duncanville	1	Plano	0		5A
1988	Plano	2	Klein Oak	1		5A
1989	Plano	2	San Antonio Madison	1		5A
1991	San Antonio Madison	3	Plano	0		5A
1997	Plano	4	San Antonio Churchill	0		5A

==== Other sports ====
Plano has also had state titles in boys' golf in 1989 and 1994. Plano lost in the team tennis state finals in 1994, 1995, 1996, and 1998. The Plano swim team has been very successful. The boys won state titles in 1991, 1992 and 1998. The girls won in 1988 and 1998. Since the 2000–2001 season there have been 2 national champions, 7 state champions, 1 Texas 5A State Record Holder, 4 Texas 5A Male Swimmers of the Year, and 63 All-Americans. The Plano boys' and girls' cross country teams have both seen success, including sending Scott McPherson to the 2004 Locker Championship. The 1991 and 1992 Men's teams finished 4th and 3rd in the state respectively.

=== Music ===
Plano Senior High was named by the Grammy Foundation as a 2005 Grammy Signature School Gold school for their achievement in the arts. In 2008, Plano Senior High School was once again one of two schools in the nation to be named a Grammy Signature School Gold.

==== Choir ====
The Plano Senior High School Varsity Women's Choir was named a TMEA Honor Choir in 2009. In 2012, the Plano Senior High School A Cappella Mixed Choir was announced to represent the state of Texas at ACDA. In 2016, it was announced that the Plano Senior High School Varsity Women's Choir would once again be named as a TMEA Honor Choir at the 2017 convention. In addition, the Plano Senior High School Varsity Men's Choir represented the state of Texas at ACDA in 2017.

==== Band ====
An unofficial band was first organized in 1935. In 1955, Plano hired University of Arkansas graduate Emmitt Clem, who led the band for twenty-one years and wrote the school song. The band performed pre-game for the first Dallas Cowboys season and at a nationally televised Cowboys game at the Cotton Bowl in 1962. In June 1976 the Plano band traveled to Washington DC and played on the steps of the US Capitol during national bicentennial events. The band performed in the 1977 State high school championship football game at Texas Stadium where Plano beat Port Neches Groves 13–10. Doc Severinsen, band leader of The Tonight Show Starring Johnny Carson, visited the high school annually between 1978 and 1990 to play a concert with the band. The band has performed in Carnegie Hall and at The Midwest Band and Orchestra Clinic. In 2007, The Plano Wind Ensemble was named a 5A National Wind Honor Band, ranking them fifth in the nation. The Jazz Band at Plano was chosen to attend the Essentially Ellington Competition in New York City in both 2005 and 2010.

==== Orchestra ====
The Plano Senior High Full Orchestra (composed of the best winds and strings at the school) was named Texas' Honor Full Orchestra in 2007, 2009, 2012, and 2015. Plano's String Orchestra was selected as the TMEA honor orchestra in 1993, 1995 and 1998. In 1995, the Orchestra played at Carnegie Hall.

== Notable alumni ==
- Steve Anderson – Disney animator, voice actor and director, most notable for direction and voice work in Meet the Robinsons
- Aaron Aryanpur – stand-up comedian
- Brandon Aubrey – NFL placekicker with the Dallas Cowboys and former USFL kicker and professional soccer player, 2022 USFL Champion.
- Rex Burkhead – NFL running back with Houston Texans, Super Bowl LIII champion, formerly at University of Nebraska–Lincoln
- Patrick Crusius – Perpetrator of the 2019 El Paso shooting
- Chad Deering – MLS midfielder who played for Dallas Burn and U.S. national team, appearing in 1998 FIFA World Cup
- Karith Foster – comedian and national radio personality, Imus in the Morning
- Amber Glenn - Olympic figure skating champion
- Brad Hawkins – actor, martial artist and country music singer
- Fred E. Haynes Jr. – Major general in the Marine Corps; brother of actor Jerry Haynes
- Rick Hearst – actor and winner of Daytime Emmy Awards for roles on General Hospital and Guiding Light
- John B. Herrington – NASA astronaut; first Native American to fly in outer space
- John Benjamin Hickey – actor, The Good Wife, ABC sitcom It's All Relative and films Infamous and Transformers: Revenge of the Fallen
- Kristen Holt – host on G4TV and former Dallas Cowboys Cheerleader
- Elise Hu – journalist
- Tim Lashar – former NFL placekicker
- Karen MacInerney – author of Gray Whale Inn mystery series
- Missie McGeorge – state junior golf champion 1976, SMU, 19 years on LPGA Tour
- Scott Mechlowicz – actor appearing in Eurotrip, Mean Creek and Peaceful Warrior
- Katelyn Ohashi – UCLA gymnast
- Hunter Parrish – actor, notable for Weeds, supporting role in 17 Again, lead role in Spring Awakening, role of Jesus in critically acclaimed Godspell
- Malcolm Perry – first doctor to attend to John F. Kennedy at Parkland Hospital
- Alan Reuber – NFL tackle with Arizona Cardinals, formerly at Texas A&M University
- Bobby Roe – actor, writer, director of The Houses October Built series
- Billy Ray Smith – former NFL linebacker and current Fox Sports personality
- Brandon Stephens – football player for the Baltimore Ravens
- Pat Thomas – former two-time All-Pro NFL defensive back
- T. J. Thyne – actor, notable for Bones (TV series)
- Alan Tudyk – actor, notable for Rogue One, Firefly, A Knight's Tale, Dodgeball, 3:10 To Yuma, Frozen, Wreck-It Ralph, Arrested Development, and Broadway musical, Spamalot
- Michael Urie – actor, notable for Ugly Betty and Uptown Girls
- Chris Valletta – former NFL offensive lineman, contestant on The Apprentice
