= Chris Valletta =

American businessman, author, football player, and television contestant

- Born: 1977 or 1978 (age 47–48)
- Education: Texas A&M University and Harvard Business School (Executive Degree)
- Occupations: President and Business Owner
- Employer: Mission
- Known for: Playing in the NFL with the Tennessee Titans, New Orleans Saints and Tampa Bay Buccaneers.
- Notable work: TeamWORKS!
- Television: The Apprentice, Season 4. Independent contributor to Fox News and various networks.
- Board member of: Former Chairman, the Health and Wellness Committee for the NFL Alumni Organization (NY/NJ). Texas A&M Association of Former Students (Representative at Large). Advisor McFerrin Center for Entrepreneurship.
- Website: www.leadershipisservice.com

Chris Valletta is an American businessman, author, and former American football player. He also appeared as a contestant on The Apprentice and as an independent contributor on Fox News and other news networks.

== Football career ==
=== High school and college ===
Born in New England, Valletta moved to Plano, Texas in the 1990s, where he attended Plano Senior High School and played football as an offensive lineman, and was on the Plano Senior Wildcats team that won the 5A State Championship in 1994. At Plano, Chris was selected to the prestigious Parade All American Team in 1995. Valletta played football as an offensive linesman at Texas A&M University from 1997 to 2000, where he received All-Conference honors. During his time at A&M, he played on the teams that won the Big 12 South Championship in 1997 and the Big 12 Championship in 1998. On November 18, 1999, the Aggie Bonfire, part of the pregame festivities between Texas A&M and the University of Texas collapsed during construction, killing 12 and injuring 27. At the game, held the following Friday, Valletta wrote the names of the 12 students on a shirt beneath his jersey. Valletta graduated in 2001, with degrees in majoring in speech communication and rhetorical theory, as well as political science. Chris completed the executive program in entrepreneurship from Harvard Business School in 2015.

=== Professional ===
Valletta signed to the Tennessee Titans in 2001 as an undrafted free agent. He was released in August of the same year, and signed to the New Orleans Saints, where he was released in August 2002. He then joined the Tampa Bay Buccaneers, playing Offensive Guard and Center on their practice squad for a short period. Valletta never appeared on their roster. Tampa Bay went on to win the Super Bowl that season, beating the Oakland Raiders 48–21 in Super Bowl XXXVII

== Professional career ==
=== KRLD and Big Tree Investments ===
Following his retirement from the NFL, Valletta worked in advertising sales at KRLD News Radio in Dallas, where he became the first rookie salesperson of the year in company history. During this time, he started a real estate company called Big Tree Investments LLC.

=== Appearance on The Apprentice ===
In 2005, Valletta was selected for the cast of the fourth season of The Apprentice. Following a ratings slide in the show's third season, Valletta was part of a cast that was personally selected by Donald Trump. He was the second contestant fired from the show, after serving as the project manager for the losing team on a task that involved creating a 30-second television commercial and print ads for a new Lamborghini sports car. He also appeared on The Big Idea with Donny Deutsch.

=== GoSMILE ===
Following his appearance on The Apprentice, Valletta was named the senior director for business development at GoSMILE Inc. A company that markets tooth-whitening products, GoSMILE was co-founded by Josh Shaw, one of Valletta's fellow Apprentice contestants. GoSMILE was later acquired by investment firm JH Partners.

=== Mission ===
Valletta is the co-founder of Mission. Founded in 2009, the company markets a line of instant cooling products for active consumers who work or play in the heat. The products are conceived, researched and developed by scientists, labor workers and athletes like Serena Williams, Dwyane Wade and Drew Brees, many of whom are also stakeholders in the company. The company was named as the Sports Marketer of the Year for 2012 by readers of NYSportsJournalism. Valletta exited the day to day in December, 2023 and serves on the board of directors.

=== SideKick Operators ===
Valletta joined SideKick Operators as President in 2024, a Texas-based Family Investment Office that invests in the service businesses that keep the American infrastructure running. SideKick is composed entirely of former founders, operators, and entrepreneurs, and leverages an Operator-first investment model, supporting business owners predominantly in the trades.

== Affiliations ==
Valletta served as the chairman of the Health and Wellness Committee for the NFL Alumni Organization and currently serves as a representative at large for the Association of a Former Students at Texas A&M University and as an advisor to the McFerrin Center for Entreprenruship at Texas A&M. Valletta also serves on the board of directors for Young Life Ministries in New York City. (NY/NJ).

== Personal life ==
Valletta resides in South Florida.
