= Karen MacInerney =

American novelist

Karen MacInerney is an American novelist who is the author of several series: a cozy mystery series about a bed and breakfast owner in an island community off the coast of Maine, a cozy mystery series about a homesteader in rural Texas, a cozy mystery series featuring a bookseller in coastal Maine, a paranormal series with a strong streak of humour, about an accountant trying to ignore the werewolf gene she has inherited from her father, and a humorous mystery series about a suburban mom who decides to become a private investigator. She is a graduate of Plano Senior High School and Rice University. She currently resides in Austin, TX.

MacInerney is a USA Today bestselling author, a member of Sisters in Crime and the Writers' League of Texas, and the founder of Austin Mystery Writers. Her first book, Murder on the Rocks, was nominated for an Agatha Award for Best First Novel. On the Prowl was later nominated for the Paranormal Excellence Award for Romantic Fiction award. MacInerney was awarded the SAGE Award for Mentoring Authors by the Barbara Burnett Smith Mentoring Authors Foundation.

== Books ==
- (With Barbara Burnett Smith) Beads of Doubt (novel), 2007.

== Gray Whale Inn series ==
- Murder on the Rocks, 2006. Agatha Award Nominee for Best First Novel.
- Dead and Berried, 2007.
- Murder Most Maine, 2008.
- Berried to the Hilt, 2010.
- Brush with Death, 2013.
- Death Runs Adrift, 2014.
- Whale of a Crime, 2017.
- Claws for Alarm, 2018.
- Scone Cold Dead, 2019.
- Anchored Inn, 2020.
- The Gray Whale Inn Kitchen, 2016 (Cookbook.)
- "Blueberry Blues", 2012 (Short Story.)
- "Pumpkin Pied". (Short Story.)
- "Iced Inn", 2019. (Short Story.)
- "Lupine Lies", 2019. (Short Story.)
- Four Seasons at the Gray Whale Inn, 2020. (Anthology.)

== Snug Harbor series ==
- A Killer Ending, 2020.
- Inked Out, 2021.

== Dewberry Farm series ==
- Killer Jam, 2015.
- Fatal Frost, 2016.
- Deadly Brew, 2017.
- Mistletoe Murder, 2017.
- Dyeing Season, 2019.
- Wicked Harvest, 2019.
- Sweet Revenge, 2020.
- Six Merry Little Murders: Slay Bells Ring, 2019. (Anthology.)
- Slay Bells Ring, 2020. (Novella.)
- Lucy's Farmhouse Kitchen, 2019. (Cookbook.)

== Tales of an Urban Werewolf series ==
- Howling at the Moon, 2008.
- On the Prowl, 2008.
- Leader of the Pack, 2009.

== Margie Peterson series ==
- Mother's Day Out, 2014.
- Mother Knows Best, 2016.
- Mother's Little Helper, 2017.
