= The Apprentice (American TV series) season 4 =

The Apprentice
- Season 4
- No. of contestants: 18
- Winner: Randal Pinkett
- Runner-up: Rebecca Jarvis
- No. of episodes: 13

Release
- Original network: NBC
- Original release: September 22 – December 15, 2005

Additional information
- Filming dates: April 2005 – May 2005

Season chronology
- ← Previous; Season 3 Next → Season 5

The Apprentice 4 is the fourth season of The Apprentice, with Donald Trump as the executive producer and host. The show was aired on Thursday nights at 9 p.m. on NBC and started September 22, 2005.

This was the first season of the show not to place in the Top 20 Nielsen Ratings; it averaged #38 with 11.01 million viewers.

Starting with this season, frequent boardroom adviser George H. Ross began to lessen his involvement with the show, with The Apprentice first season winner Bill Rancic effectively sharing the role with him throughout this and the following season.

== Candidates ==
Unhappy with both the choice of candidates and the "street smarts" vs. "book smarts" premise from the preceding season, Trump went to the auditions and hand-picked 17 of the 18 candidates in season 4. In addition to candidate handpicking, Trump decided to go back to the premise of men versus women (there was eventually corporate restructuring). The all-women team named their corporation Capital Edge while the all-men team named their corporation Excel.

Recalling how some of the contestants in season 3 such as Michael Tarshi and Tana Goertz abused their exemptions from getting fired by choosing to be lazy instead of continuing to work hard on the tasks they were given, Trump made a new rule for exemptions in this season. The winning project manager, throughout the season, may be exempt from firing for the following week only if the majority of the other members in their team believed he/she did a satisfactory job. In the previous two seasons, the winning project manager would automatically be exempt from firing. The season had 3 episodes end with multiple firings, 2 of them were double firings, and one was a quadruple firing, the largest in the show's history.

Team 1	Team 2
Capital Edge	Excel

Candidate	Background	Original team	Age	Hometown	Result
Randal Pinkett	Consulting firm owner	Excel	34	Somerset, New Jersey	Hired by Trump (12-15-2005)
Rebecca Jarvis	Financial journalist	Capital Edge	23	Chicago, Illinois	Fired in the season finale (12-15-2005)
Alla Wartenberg	Salon & spa chain owner	Capital Edge	31	Las Vegas, Nevada	Fired in week 11 (12-1-2005)
Felisha Mason	Real estate developer	Capital Edge	29	Kansas City, Missouri	Fired in week 11 (12-1-2005)
Adam Israelov	Risk manager	Excel	22	Atlanta, Georgia	Fired in week 10 (11-24-2005)
Clay Lee	Realtor	Excel	28	College Station, Texas	Fired in week 9 (11-17-2005)
Marshawn Evans	Recent law school graduate	Capital Edge	26	Atlanta, Georgia	Fired in week 8 (11-10-2005)
Brian Mandelbaum	Print company executive	Excel	23	New York, New York	Fired in week 8 (11-10-2005)
Markus Garrison	Inventor	Excel	41	Sarasota, Florida	Fired in week 7 (11-3-2005)
James Dillon	Sales executive	Excel	27	Alexandria, Virginia	Fired in week 6 (10-27-2005)
Mark Lamkin	Wealth manager	Excel	35	Louisville, Kentucky	Fired in week 6 (10-27-2005)
Jennifer Murphy	Beauty pageant contestant	Capital Edge	26	Los Angeles, California	Fired in week 6 (10-27-2005)
Josh Shaw	Beauty company owner	Excel	30	New York, New York	Fired in week 6 (10-27-2005)
Kristi Caudell	Sales executive	Capital Edge	24	Gainesville, Georgia	Fired in week 5 (10-20-2005)
Toral Mehta	Investment banker	Capital Edge	29	Philadelphia, Pennsylvania	Fired in week 4 (10-13-2005)
Jennifer Wallen	Realty company owner	Capital Edge	31	Anthem, Arizona	Fired in week 3 (10-6-2005)
Chris Valletta	Marketing executive	Excel	27	Dallas, Texas	Fired in week 2 (9-29-2005)
Melissa Holovach	Real estate investor	Capital Edge	30	Tampa, Florida	Fired in week 1 (9-22-2005)

== Weekly results ==
Candidate	Original team	Week 5 team	Week 6 team	Week 7 team	Week 9 team	Final week team	Application result	Record as project manager
Randal Pinkett	Excel	Capital Edge	Capital Edge	Excel	Excel	Excel	Hired by Trump	3–0 (win in weeks 3, 7, & 10)
Rebecca Jarvis	Capital Edge	Capital Edge	Excel	Excel	Excel	Capital Edge	Fired in the Season Finale	1–2 (win in week 11, loss in weeks 3 & 9)
Alla Wartenberg	Capital Edge	Capital Edge	Capital Edge	Capital Edge	Capital Edge		Fired in week 11	1–1 (win in week 6, loss in week 10)
Felisha Mason	Capital Edge	Capital Edge	Capital Edge	Capital Edge	Capital Edge		Fired in week 11	1–2 (win in week 9, loss in weeks 4 & 11)
Adam Israelov	Excel	Excel	Capital Edge	Capital Edge	Capital Edge		Fired in week 10	0–1 (loss in week 7)
Clay Lee	Excel	Excel	Capital Edge	Capital Edge	Excel		Fired in week 9	2–0 (win in weeks 4 & 8)
Marshawn Evans	Capital Edge	Capital Edge	Excel	Excel		Excel	Fired in week 8	1–0 (win in week 2)
Brian Mandelbaum	Excel	Excel	Excel	Excel			Fired in week 8	1–1 (win in week 5, loss in week 8)
Markus Garrison	Excel	Excel	Capital Edge	Capital Edge			Fired in week 7	1–0 (win in week 1)
James Dillon	Excel	Excel	Excel			Capital Edge	Fired in week 6	
Mark Lamkin	Excel	Excel	Excel			Excel	Fired in week 6	
Jennifer Murphy	Capital Edge	Capital Edge	Excel				Fired in week 6	0–1 (loss in week 5)
Josh Shaw	Excel	Excel	Excel			Excel	Fired in week 6	0–1 (loss in week 6)
Kristi Caudell	Capital Edge	Capital Edge					Fired in week 5	0–1 (loss in week 1)
Toral Mehta	Capital Edge					Capital Edge	Fired in week 4	
Jennifer Wallen	Capital Edge						Fired in week 3	
Chris Valletta	Excel					Capital Edge	Fired in week 2	0–1 (loss in week 2)
Melissa Holovach	Capital Edge						Fired in week 1	

Elimination Chart
No.	Candidate	1	2	3	4	5	6	7	8	9	10	11	12
1	Randal	IN	IN	WIN	IN	IN	IN	WIN	IN	IN	WIN	IN	HIRED
2	Rebecca	IN	IN	LOSE	IN	IN	IN	IN	IN	LOSE	IN	WIN	FIRED
3–4	Alla	IN	IN	IN	IN	IN	WIN	IN	IN	IN	LOSE	FIRED	
3–4	Felisha	IN	IN	IN	LOSE	IN	IN	IN	IN	WIN	BR	FIRED	
5	Adam	IN	IN	IN	IN	IN	IN	LOSE	IN	IN	FIRED		
6	Clay	IN	IN	IN	WIN	IN	IN	BR	WIN	FIRED			
7–8	Marshawn	IN	WIN	IN	IN	IN	IN	IN	FIRED				
7–8	Brian	IN	IN	IN	IN	WIN	IN	IN	FIRED				
9	Markus	WIN	BR	IN	IN	IN	IN	FIRED					
10–13	James	IN	IN	IN	IN	IN	FIRED						
10–13	Mark	IN	IN	IN	IN	IN	FIRED						
10–13	Jennifer M.	IN	IN	BR	IN	LOSE	FIRED						
10–13	Josh	IN	IN	IN	IN	IN	FIRED						
14	Kristi	LOSE	IN	IN	IN	FIRED							
15	Toral	IN	IN	IN	FIRED								
16	Jennifer W.	IN	IN	FIRED									
17	Chris	IN	FIRED										
18	Melissa	FIRED											

The candidate was on the losing team.
The candidate was hired and won the competition.
The candidate won as project manager on his/her team.
The candidate lost as project manager on his/her team.
The candidate was brought to the final boardroom.
The candidate was fired.
The candidate lost as project manager and was fired.

== Episodes ==
=== Week 1: Let's Get Physical ===
- Air date: September 22, 2005
- Sponsor: Bally Total Fitness
- Project: Teams had to create and promote a workout class for Bally Total Fitness. The team that generates the most renevue of profit wins.
- Judges: Donald Trump; Carolyn Kepcher; George H. Ross
- Trump Monologue: Can't We All Get Along - It is a lot harder to be successful if you can't work with people.
- Capital Edge project manager: Kristi
- Excel project manager: Markus
- Winning team: Excel
  - Team's profit: $527
  - Reason for win: Markus executed the key strategy of offering a lower cost & deluxe packages, which increased sales and was key to the victory. Excel had a better location than Capital Edge and focused their efforts on Bally's existing customers, taking advantage of the captive audience.
  - Exemption: In a new twist, the winning team would have to vote if their project manager would be exempt from being fired. When Trump asked if Markus should be exempt, only Adam and Randal voted yes, which was not a majority vote and did not grant Markus immunity from the next firing.
  - Excel's reward: Friar's Club lunch with Donald Trump.
- Losing team: Capital Edge
  - Team's profit: $516
  - Reasons for loss: Despite a narrow loss of $11, the marketing was ultimately deemed critical to the loss. The flyer that came out from the graphic designer included XXX in between "Triple Threat" rather than outside of the words as Kristi requested, suggesting the class had an illicit and inappropriate theme which alluded to pornography and implied that the place was a strip club.
  - Sent to boardroom: Kristi and Melissa. - Kristi asks if she could bring only one person back into the boardroom. Trump complied, making it the first time in Apprentice history that only one candidate was brought back, when they had the option to bring back two. This would not be the only time, as future candidates would also only bring back one person to the boardroom in this season.
  - Firing Verdict: While Kristi was sharply criticized by Carolyn for her role in the loss, a majority of Capital Edge said that Melissa was very negative, dramatic, and obnoxious with Marshawn being the lone dissenter as she blamed the team's loss on Kristi and her marketing skills, though she did agree that Melissa was disruptive. Several team members pointed out that the loss could have been prevented had Melissa's behavior had not been untenable.
  - Fired: Melissa Holovach – for being unable to work with women and for her disruptive behavior throughout the entire task. Melissa virtually destroyed her chances of being hired by Trump and continuing on the show when she admitted (repeatedly) that she can not get along with women. She also added that women generally dislike her because they feel threatened or intimidated by her beauty and intelligence, which did not impress Trump or his advisors.
- Notes:
  - After splitting the candidates into the two teams, Trump offered a reward to the first person to reach his helicopter, which was on the other side of the golf course. The winner's team would be granted the use of the helicopter for the duration of the task. Mark, from Excel, reached the helicopter first.
  - This is the first time that an all-male team won the first task and the first time that the eventual winner won the first task.
  - Josh said that, unless the PM was at least 50% of the victory, the men did not intend to grant any winning project manager immunity during the course of the season, as they felt that no candidate could single-handedly be responsible for a team's victory, believing Markus was "less than 5%" of the reason for victory. Ultimately however, every other victorious project manager this season (apart from Clay in Week 8) would be voted to receive immunity by their teammates, and it was clear in retrospect the men denied Markus the immunity because they did not like him and were not willing to give him any tangible credit for "leading" them to a victory.
  - Starting with this season, the end credits aired after the exit interview. In all prior seasons, the end credits aired during the exit interview.
  - Melissa's firing marked the first time that a female competitor was the first person to be fired from the show. All previous seasons featured a man being the first one fired.
  - After Melissa's elimination, Kristi made a smug smirk and Trump immediately chastised her for it, saying she had "nothing to be proud of".
  - Melissa later appeared on a Dr. Phil episode where she continued to blame Kristi for her firing (though she did not refer to Kristi by name) before conceding that she had not done a good job and needed to look more closely at herself for that.
  - During the filming of the first task, Randal was told that his grandmother had died. After announcing Excel's win, Trump gave Randal the opportunity to leave the show. Randal declined, saying he felt that his grandmother would have wanted him to stay on the show. During the filming of episode 2, Trump allowed Randal to borrow his helicopter and attend the funeral.
- Episode 1 Recap from NBC.com

=== Week 2: There's No Little "i" in Team ===
- Air date: September 29, 2005
- Sponsor: Lamborghini
- Project: Teams had to create an advertising campaign for Lamborghini cars.
- Judges: Donald Trump; Carolyn Kepcher; George H. Ross
- Trump Monologue: Be Flexible - In business it is important to adapt, and if you don't adapt you are never going to be good in business and you are never going to be successful. Show flexibility, be able to make a change.
- Capital Edge project manager: Marshawn
- Excel project manager: Chris
- Winning team: Capital Edge
  - Reasons for victory: Their campaign was very strong overall and had no significant weaknesses, and the Lamborghini executives particularly liked the fact that their campaign conveyed the message through images and emotion alone, without needing too much text. They also liked their advertisement, presentation, and the video.
  - Exemption: All of Capital Edge (with the exception of Kristi whose likely motivation was because Marshawn threw her under the bus in the previous task) voted to have Marshawn exempt from being fired in Week 3.
  - Capital Edge's reward: Hockey with New York Islanders legends and prospects. At the reward, Rebecca fell and broke her ankle.
- Losing team: Excel
  - Reasons for loss: Despite that both teams had solid and outstanding video adverts, the executive felt the men was not as strong than the women by having the presentation too wordy and felt that Excel had made critical errors by making their marketing materials too verbose. On top of that, grammatical errors were spotted on the team's printed ad posters; one ad, which read "Green With Envy" caused confusion whilst Markus tried to inform his team it should have read "Green With Envy?". With the second ad, the executives did not like the fact that the Italian on "Rebirth of Italian Intimidation" had a lowercase "i" on their ad.
  - Sent to boardroom: Chris and Markus
  - Firing verdict:
    - Chris was adamant about getting Markus fired, claiming that he disrupted the team's unity. Even though several other members of Excel wanted Markus gone as well (Josh and Clay in particular), and Trump himself said he didn't like that Markus spoke out against his team, Trump and his advisors reminded them that Markus was not responsible for losing the task, and he even had the correct idea for one of their ads.
    - Prior to Chris choosing only Markus back to the boardroom, Trump made it clear that Chris should bring Mark into the boardroom, because Mark was responsible for the bad grammar on the ads. Chris took the blame for Mark's mistake, saying he believed in Mark and when Mark failed, he failed too.
  - Fired: Chris Valletta – for producing a mediocre ad-poster, presenting a mediocre, disengaged presentation to the executives, allowing his emotions to influence his decision-making after bringing in Markus back to the boardroom, and for effectively being responsible for the loss after not bringing in Mark instead. Trump and his advisors saw potential in Chris, but they did not like the fact that he deliberately brought back Markus and not Mark, after Trump clearly stated not to do so otherwise; Carolyn in particular said that she would have kept Chris over Mark without a second thought had both been in the final boardroom.
- Notes:
  - Chris had brought back Markus alone, which did not statistically improve his chances of not being fired.
  - After being fired, Trump told Chris that he thought Chris had great potential and then warned Markus that he would not last long, to which Markus replied "I'll prove you wrong". Markus would go on to be fired the next time he lost a task.
  - In his exit interview, Chris continued to bad-mouth Markus. He claimed "Markus didn't even have his hands on the paddle, was facing the opposite direction drinking a martini talking to the captain." He was talking as if the team was on a boat and saying Markus was "the one guy not paddling".
  - In the middle of the task, Randal left to attend his grandmother's funeral. He arrived back at the agency as Excel was getting ready to present their advertising campaign to Lamborghini.
  - The little "i" in the episode's title refers to the error in Excel's advertising. Mark thought that using the small "i" in "Rebirth of Italian Intimidation" to match the small "i's" in Lamborghini would have looked better.
  - Because of the NHL lockout taking place during filming of this task, the reward only involved Islanders legends and prospects. Active players were not eligible to participate in the reward because of the lockout not having been settled at the time of taping.
  - Markus pitched the slogan "Smooth As Silk", as part of a visual package. A Lamborghini executive rejected it outright. Although not mentioned during the episode, it happens that this slogan was already in use by Thai Airways International for over 30 years.
  - This is the first time in The Apprentice history when only two candidates were pulled into the final boardroom for two consecutive weeks, when the project manager had the option to bring in two or three candidates.
- Episode 2 Recap from NBC.com

=== Week 3: Something Old, Something New ===
- Air date: October 6, 2005
- Sponsor: Best Buy Geek Squad
- Project: Excel and Capital Edge were both given space at the Cedar Crest Village Home in Pompton Plains, New Jersey to host a technology expo for the senior citizens. All the equipment was purchased at Best Buy using the allotted Best Buy gift cards.
- Judges: Donald Trump; Carolyn Kepcher; George H. Ross
- Trump Monologue: Inspire - Leadership is very important in business, you have to really make them respect you. Hilariously the monologue shows footage of Trump motivating one of his lawyer by flaunting Jennifer Hawkins Miss Universe 2004 in-front of him. It was out of context and exactly how she was inspiring was not elaborated.
- Capital Edge project manager: Rebecca
- Excel project manager: Randal
- Task tension: While the task generally ran much smoother than the two previous ones, there were still minor issues on both teams. On Excel, Clay attempted to shoot down every idea that Markus came up with (despite the other men actually liking and ultimately using his ideas), and then unwittingly offended George by asking him to back up his claim that older people are fixed in their habits, and unwilling to learn. Meanwhile, on Capital Edge most of the women felt that Rebecca was an abrasive leader and a poor motivator.
- Winning team: Excel
  - Reason for victory: The men created a lot of buzz around their expo, and focused on demonstrations that would be easy to follow and would allow the senior citizens to interact with the new technology. In spite of Clay's concerns, Markus excelled in the role of explaining the complicated TIVO system to the senior citizens proving to be a major factor in Excel scoring an average rating of 8.1 from the attendees.
  - Exemption: Excel voted unanimously to have Randal exempt from firing for Week 4.
  - Excel's reward: Handing out toys to children at a hospital.
- Losing team: Capital Edge
  - Reasons for loss: Although the technology demonstrations were generally okay (with the notable exception of Toral, who got completely lost while trying to demonstrate a TV), the team was let down badly by Jennifer W.'s poor organization and decoration of the event, which looked bare and uninviting. Worse, the cake that was presented to their focus group (as pointed out by Carolyn) had a critical spelling error as it said Tethno Expo instead of Techno Expo. Capital Edge's expo was rated at 7.9 by the attendees.
  - Sent to boardroom: Rebecca, Jennifer M., and Jennifer W., in spite of the team's criticisms and a strong suggestion by Trump for Toral to be brought back.
  - Firing Verdict:
    - Trump disagreed with Rebecca's decision to not bring Toral back, as well as her decision to bring in Jennifer M. for the boardroom; however, he felt that Rebecca had potential. Rebecca also strongly defended Toral to the point where Trump allowed Toral one last chance to prove herself.
    - Carolyn found Capital Edge's presentation boring, dull and drab and was also the one to point out to Jennifer W. that instead of the cake saying "Techno Expo", it read "Tethno Expo". Jennifer W. was exposed to be primarily liable for the refreshments and the decorations, prompting Trump to find Jennifer W. to ultimately be liable for the loss.
  - Fired: Jennifer Wallen – for being the most accountable to her team's failure due to her lackluster event planning which was dull and uninviting, and poorly running the event.
- Notes:
  - Rebecca started out the episode on crutches after breaking her ankle during the reward from the previous task.
  - When asked if Markus was the weakest member on Excel again, the men defended him and noted his improvement, impressing Trump.
  - After the candidates had left the boardroom, referring to Rebecca, Trump told Carolyn and George, "This girl's either gonna be great or a disaster."
  - In her exit interview, Jennifer W. claimed she is a great event planner.
- Episode 3 Recap from NBC.com

=== Week 4: Ice Cream of Genie ===
- Airdate: October 13, 2005
- Sponsor: Dairy Queen
- Project: Teams had to create a new promotional character for the Dairy Queen Blizzard Treat. The winning team will be judged based on the executive's decision.
- Judges: Donald Trump; Carolyn Kepcher; George H. Ross
- Trump Monologue: Maximize Potential - A good leader has to be able to recognize the strengths and weaknesses of employees. The leader has to see who is really strong and where.
- Capital Edge project manager: Felisha
- Excel project manager: Clay
- Winning team: Excel
  - Reasons for victory: The team incorporated both the Dairy Queen logo and ice cream into their character. The executives felt it should have had a little more in the way of Blizzard Treat-specific features, but the finished product was still far more suitable than Capital Edge's effort.
  - Exemption: All of Excel voted for Clay to be exempt from firing in week 5 before the reward was announced
  - Excel's reward: Playing baseball with the New York Mets
- Losing team: Capital Edge
  - Reasons for loss: The women completely missed the mark. The team's character was overly cartoonish and did not advertise the Dairy Queen or Blizzard Treat brand at all. While Jennifer M. and Marshawn lobbied for the Dairy Queen logo to be placed on their mascot design, the rest of the team vetoed it. The executives felt that Capital Edge had misunderstood Dairy Queen's target market, as their target was teenagers and young adults, whereas Capital Edge's character seemed to be aimed at children.
  - Initial Boardroom: Felisha seemed to be in serious danger early in the boardroom, after she was deemed to be a weak leader and could not effectively defend herself from George and Carolyn's criticism of her decisions, which included the poorly designed costume and lack of branding. Toral then spoke up and criticised Felisha for trying to get her to dress up as their character, saying that she considered such a request offensive because of her cultural beliefs, but the other women told Trump that Toral had said no such thing during the task, effectively shifting everything to her. Toral then tried to justify her failure to step up as project manager by saying that Felisha had claimed to be a marketing genius, but Felisha and the others denied that. Compounding her situation, Toral also unwittingly insulted Trump by saying that no serious businessperson would dress up in a silly costume, causing Trump to point out several occasions (including a Saturday Night Live appearance) when he had done such a thing.
  - Sent to boardroom: No final boardroom – while Trump considered Felisha to be primarily responsible for the loss, he was enraged at Toral's excuses and failure to perform, especially since she was educated at Wharton, a school which he regards highly ( as he attended Wharton himself ), that he fired her instead, and on the spot. Rebecca reluctantly and sadly had to admit that she would fire Toral when Trump asked her, for the aforementioned critical error described.
  - Fired: Toral Mehta – for making an excessive number of excuses as to why she had not stepped up in any regard to the task, not living up to Rebecca's promises, and being a generally ineffective and divisive force in her team. Toral not only did nothing in this task, but she also procrastinated during the costume presentation phase, including, but not limited to, not giving Felisha a hard reason why she cannot wear the costume. She also disassociated herself from the result, saying the team deserved to lose, but Marshawn strongly pointed out that Toral did not contribute to tasks, meaning she was not a part of wins or losses. Trump expressed huge disappointment at Toral, feeling she should have been one of the stronger candidates due to her intelligence, but hated how she never stepped up nor took responsibility for her actions, even when Rebecca fought for her to stay. Trump made it clear Rebecca would have been fired as well if she defended Toral again.
- Notes:
  - Rebecca asked Toral to step up as Project Manager after the previous episode's boardroom, but Toral still refused to do so, resulting in Rebecca reluctantly saying that Toral should be fired when Trump asked her opinion.
  - Although Kristi was not polite throughout the task, she, alongside Alla, Jennifer M. and Felisha asked Toral to wear the costume, but Toral refused to do so, not only because the costume was poorly designed, but also for personal reasons (including but not limited to her religious beliefs), however she did not bring up the hard reasons why she cannot wear "silly-designed costumes" to her colleagues prior to both the presentation and before the boardroom.
  - In the end Trump, Carolyn, and George agreed that firing Toral was the right choice.
  - This was the second occasion where Trump fired someone without asking the project manager who they wanted to bring back, after Brian McDowell in Season 3. Brian however was the project manager in that task whereas Toral was not; additionally, Brian immediately took full responsibility for the loss and told Trump to fire him, meaning that the boardroom never progressed to the point where it became necessary for Trump to ask him who he wanted to bring back. Toral was therefore technically the first candidate whom Trump felt so strongly deserved to be fired that he did so without asking the losing project manager who they wished to bring back.
  - Episode 4 Recap from NBC.com

=== Week 5: Lost in Space ===
- Airdate: October 20, 2005
- Sponsor: Sony Pictures
- Project: The teams had to design a parade float in order to advertise for the upcoming release of the film Zathura: A Space Adventure. The winning float would be chosen by the film's director, Jon Favreau, and a Sony Pictures executive.
- Judges: Donald Trump; Carolyn Kepcher; Bill Rancic
- Trump Monologue: Money Matters - Business is all about money, money is a score card.
  - Corporate restruction: Randal transferred to Capital Edge to even out the teams, since the women were down to 6 members
- Capital Edge project manager: Jennifer M.
- Excel project manager: Brian
- Winning team: Excel (Brian exempted)
  - Reason for victory: Despite Brian giving an awful presentation to Favreau and the Sony executive, their float was well-built and made strong use of the Zathura branding, even having an audio clip of the correct pronunciation to ensure that the film's name would be remembered by people who saw the float.
  - Excel's reward: A Recording Session with Wyclef Jean where the men recorded a song called "Rubble Man".
- Losing team: Capital Edge
  - Reason for loss: Their float was built to a far lower quality than their rivals' effort, most notably suffering from totally inconsistent scaling and the film's logo being placed too high up. Jennifer M. mispronounced Zathura (calling it "Zenthura") several times during the presentation, which gave the executives a very bad impression of Jennifer's team in spite of Bill Carolyn and Randall finding it amusing. Things were only compounded by Kristi being extremely combative and disagreeing with her team most of the time.
  - Initial boardroom: While Jennifer M. initially came under heavy fire from Carolyn and Bill for her bad presentation, Trump noted that there were more fundamental problems to blame for Capital Edge's loss. A discussion then arose as to whether the problem was in the float's design or in the team dynamic being disrupted, leading to the other team members telling Trump that in either case, Kristi would be the most at fault for the task failure. Jennifer M. then asked to bring back Kristi alone, which Trump agreed to.
  - Sent to boardroom: Jennifer M. & Kristi
  - Fired: Kristi Caudell – for being the originator of Capital Edge's unsuccessful concept, for being too controlling and disrupting the team's dynamic. Despite Jennifer M.'s lackluster role as Project Manager, Trump concluded that Kristi's failings and her inability to work with her team were much more at fault in the end.
- Notes:
  - Brian also mispronounced the film's name (as "Zarutha") during his initial meeting with Favreau. On that occasion Favreau took the error in good humor, noting that he had mispronounced the name himself early in production, and Brian decided to incorporate the audio recording as a result of this.
  - After the firing, Jennifer tried to apologize to Kristi for getting her fired, but Kristi quickly snapped back at her.
  - Instead of the usual theme at the end of the broadcast, "Rubble Man" was broadcast as the show ended.
- Episode 5 Recap from NBC.com

=== Week 6: Take Me Out to the Boardroom ===
- Airdate: October 27, 2005
- Sponsor: Dick's Sporting Goods
- Project: The teams were tasked to promote an interactive sales event based on a sport the team chooses. The winning team will be determined as to who generates the highest percentage increase in revenue of sales. Capital Edge chose golf and Excel chose baseball.
- Judges: Donald Trump; Carolyn Kepcher; Bill Rancic
  - Corporate restructuring: Because Capital Edge lost 4 tasks (including 3 in a row), Carolyn asked each team's project manager to send three players as to who they want to move to the other team. Alla sent Jennifer M., Rebecca, and Marshawn to Excel. Josh sent Clay, Adam, and Markus to Capital Edge.
- Trump Monologue: Take It To The Limit - A successful team has to challenge each other, push your teammates to be better performers. You don't want to drive them over the edge, but push them as close to the edge as you can.
- Capital Edge project manager: Alla
- Excel project manager: Josh
- Results: Capital Edge chose golf. Excel chose baseball.
- Winning team: Capital Edge
  - Reasons for victory: Every member of the team was focused on sales instead of gimmicks, and the team also created a mini golf course to entertain the children while their parents went shopping. The result was a 74% increase in sales.
  - Exemption: All of Capital Edge voted for Alla to be exempt from firing in Week 7.
  - Capital Edge's reward: Taking a private jet to Montauk for a fishing trip and seafood dinner on the beach.
- Losing team: Excel
  - Reasons for loss: The team had no unique selling point, while the only team members to make any sales were Brian, Marshawn, and Rebecca. The rest of the team were just focused on marketing and did not make any sales whatsoever. Time and resources were also wasted by setting up a batting cage that took up most of the shop floor and did not leave any room to display the products. This resulted in Excel making sales drop 34% below average, with the total margin loss being 108%.
  - Pre-Boardroom: Before the boardroom, Josh told Mark he would bring back Jennifer M., but that he did not want to bring back James. This worried Mark, because if Josh only brought back Jennifer M. and Trump did not blame her for the loss, he'd have no choice but to fire Josh. Josh also thought that Brian, Rebecca, and Marshawn did an excellent job doing the sales.
  - Sent to boardroom: Josh, Jennifer M., James, and Mark. - Usually, Trump would allow the project manager to select 1–3 people to go back into the boardroom. But since Josh was responsible for the worst failure in the history of The Apprentice, Trump did not give Josh the opportunity to do so. Instead, Trump sent Brian back to suite (due to his exemption) along with Marshawn and Rebecca, who were the only two other than Brian to achieve sales.
  - Firing Verdict:
    - Bill grilled Jennifer M. for her role in the loss and the promises she did not deliver on. Josh and Mark quickly rounded on Jennifer M., who further harmed her cause by repeatedly snapping at Carolyn and even Trump himself on further questioning.
    - Carolyn also criticized Josh for failing as a leader and not taking any accountability for their loss, and she felt he was using Jennifer M. as a scapegoat.
    - James did reserve some criticism for Josh, who he accused of failing to give the team enough direction.
    - In the end, Trump was disappointed at all four of them for completely missing the point of the task and decided that he had no choice but to fire all four of them.
  - Fired: All four of them are fired for the largest loss ever in the history of The Apprentice, plus the following additional reasons:
    - James Dillon – for building a batting cage that forced merchandise away from the display due to the large amount of space it took in the store and caused sales to drop drastically, and misinterpreting the point of the task by being a showoff with his baseball skills.
    - Jennifer Murphy – for not delivering her promises (which disappointed Trump), taking no responsibility for the loss, bad selling skills in this task, not selling anything during the task (per Josh and Mr. Trump) and making dishonest statements about doing that (she sold food concessions as opposed to selling baseball merchandise), making far too many excuses for her shortcomings, her poor behavior in the boardroom which included being disrespectful to Trump, Bill, and Carolyn, and for getting bombarded in the boardroom by Josh and Mark. Bill said Jennifer M. promised great things, but he did not see her deliver on any of her promises, and pointed out that she "barely" evaded firing after the last task, which might have contributed to her dismissal.
    - Josh Shaw – for making numerous blatantly terrible mistakes throughout the task as Project Manager/Team Leader including showing lousy and extremely ineffective leadership, inability to control the team, blatant team sabotage, failing to give enough direction for the team, losing focus and misinterpreting the point of the task which was to sell and ran a marketing clinic instead, taking no accountability for his mistakes, blaming everything on the entire team, primarily on Jennifer M. and using her as a scapegoat, and for being Project Manager/Team Leader, at that time for the worst defeat in the history of The Apprentice (to be surpassed in Season 7).
    - Mark Lamkin – for not selling anything, taking a back seat on this task, misinterpreting the point of the task by being pre-occupied at the batting cage and teaching kids how to play baseball, and for being a generally weak contributor throughout the interview process.
- Notes:
  - Trump fired the four final boardroom candidates all at once, by reiterating the reasons for doing so, and adding, "And again, in this boardroom, we've never had a team lose so badly. You're all fired; all four are fired! Go home. Go home." Bill assured Trump that this was the only choice Trump had, since none of the four stepped up to the plate or hit the mark correctly during the task.
  - This was the first time that Trump was not present to assign the teams their task or to announce the results. Carolyn sat in Trump's chair and assigned the corporate reform and the task. She and Bill called Trump to tell him the results and he expressed great shock and disappointment when Excel's results were announced.
  - This was only the second time where more than one person was fired in a single episode outside of the interviews. The first time was when both Wes & Maria were fired in week 11 of the second season.
  - This was the worst boardroom loss ever for a team on the history of The Apprentice (to be surpassed in Season 7); Capital Edge boosted sales by 74%, and Excel dropped sales by 34%. The margin was 108% and this irritated Trump, as the margin of defeat was large beyond imagination, although Trump stated that he had to do something to seriously change Capital Edge due to their bad team record (prior to this task, Capital Edge had only won the second task).
  - This was also the first time that none of the candidates from the final boardroom returned to the suite, because all final boardroom candidates were fired, another first in the history of The Apprentice. Trump was angry at the disastrous loss margin, and Carolyn said that by their own admission of having four salespeople during the task, she could not "choose one of them" to fire for failing to deliver (Josh for being a poor leader, Jennifer for never living up to her promises, James for building the batting cage which forced merchandise away from the display and brought customers that were more interested in playing than buying, and Mark for taking a back seat on the task), which gave Trump enough information, evidence, and reasons to conduct a mass exodus.
  - As the group was leaving the boardroom, Mark apologized to Trump for the team disappointing him, and assured him that he was better than that. Trump accepted the apology, and said that all four candidates were better than what they showed.
  - After the boardroom, all four fired candidates loaded themselves and their luggage into a single waiting taxicab. During the exit interview, all four just sat awkwardly and never looked at or spoke to each other.
  - Episode 6 Recap from NBC.com

=== Week 7: Back to School ===
- Airdate: November 3, 2005
- Sponsor: The Learning Annex
  - Corporate restruction: Since Excel was grievously decimated after the previous boardroom, the team is given the opportunity to take a Capital Edge member, and in turn they take back Randal, who becomes the team's PM for the task.
- Project: The teams had to promote a new class for the Learning Annex. Capital Edge chose Sex in the Workplace and Excel chose Stand Out to Hit the Mark. The winning team is determined by scores in three areas from audience members, educational value, entertainment value, and presentation.
- Judges: Donald Trump; Carolyn Kepcher; George H. Ross
- Trump Monologue: Get To The Point - Quick, short, to the point. No games. There are only so many overs in the day, the quicker you are the more you can get done.
- Capital Edge project manager: Adam
- Excel project manager: Randal
- Winning team: Excel with an average score of 7.07 (Randal exempted)
  - Reasons for victory: Although the subject Stand Out to Hit the Mark not being exciting, Excel was very optimistic in their presentation which created a lot of positive feedback.
  - Excel's reward: A shopping spree at Michael Kors.
- Losing team: Capital Edge with an average score of 6.98
  - Reasons for loss: According to the guests in the presentation, the team had a terrible presentation and Clay offended the guests by making offensive comments, which ruined the class of Sex in the Workplace. The team was criticized for having no agenda, no flow-ideas, poor presentation, and for being boring, despite Markus' clear warnings that the chosen topic was doomed from the start.
  - Sent to boardroom: Adam, Clay, Markus
  - Fired: Markus Garrison – for not contributing much to this task, talking "in riddles", and being seen as an overall weaker competitor in the process. Despite Adam being the losing project manager, Trump felt he had potential. Trump expressed his displeasure at Clay's rude behavior and offensive comments to Jews, however he did feel that Clay had shown more potential than Markus, who did virtually nothing in comparison and did not even attempt to help his team when he knew the plan was going to fail.
- Notes:
  - This is the first week in which Excel had fewer members than Capital Edge, due to the decimation of the team the previous week.
  - Clay calls Adam a "shy, tight Jewish boy" during the sex presentation and was immediately chastised for it by Adam and George. Clay said that Adam was discussing his not wanting to pay a lot of money on dates, and he was going with Adam's own idea. While Adam believed that Clay was not anti-Semitic (which played a major role in Clay not being fired), he did cite the comments as an example of Clay being obnoxious and stupid.
  - Markus is seen smoking a Cohiba cigar during the hours before the boardroom. The show's edit falsely presented footage to suggest he was disengaged and looking at a yo-yo during the presentation, which was actually footage filmed after the event and dishonestly spliced in to disparage Markus. Markus challenged this and other deceptive edits during post-firing media interviews and also challenged Donald Trump to a debate, which never occurred.
  - Trump asked Clay whether he was a homosexual and Adam whether he had any sexual experience. In a typical job interview, those questions should not be asked, but this is not a typical job interview.
- Episode 7 Recap from NBC.com

=== Week 8: Store Wars ===
- Airdate: November 10, 2005
- Prologue: Upon returning from the boardroom after Markus's Firing, Clay just slammed the door from coming out and he was upset from his team that he got thrown under the bus by Adam, Felisha, and Alla from the boardroom. Clay angrily demanded to be project manager after being "thrown under the bus" by his team. His less-than-enthused team obliged, but it was clear they had hoped to lose the task and subsequently get Clay fired.
- Sponsor: Lucasfilm and Best Buy
- Project: The teams had to design an interactive display for the DVD release of Star Wars: Episode III – Revenge of the Sith and the video game release of Star Wars: Battlefront II
- Trump Monologue: Loyalty - A disloyal person can totally destroy an organization, if you find a disloyal person get rid of him or her immediately.
- Judges: Donald Trump; Carolyn Kepcher; Bill Rancic
- Capital Edge project manager: Clay
- Excel project manager: Brian
- Winning team: Capital Edge
  - Reasons for victory: Capital Edge won largely because of the miscues committed by Excel, though their display was generally immersive and well-executed, if a little generic.
  - Exemption: The team voted that Clay should not be exempt from firing in Week 9, as they felt that Alla had done most of the key work on the project and should have been the project manager.
  - Capital Edge's reward: Spending time with Bill Rancic, and touring Trump Tower at City Place in White Plains—Trump deduced the winning team needed more tutelage from a proven worker since Clay is not exempt.
- Losing team: Excel
  - Reasons for loss: While Excel had a good concept and seem perfectly executed, the executives from Lucasfilm and Best Buy were confused about why Darth Vader was not featured in Excel's display, as he was the key character in the film (it is important to add central characters in sales display or any segments for they are one of the key focal points in marketing). This was attributed to the fact that the team missed their meeting with the executives, which Randal had arranged for 10:15AM, but which they did not arrive at until just after 10:45AM due to Brian deciding to set out only fifteen minutes beforehand. In New York City, it is vitally important to allow ample time to approach any important engagement, and it is also very important in business that people are early to a meeting. Additionally, while Rebecca did a creditable job presenting, it was obvious that she was not fully prepared; Marshawn had initially been set to do the presentation but backed out with less than half an hour's notice.
  - Sent to boardroom: No final boardroom – Randal was exempt, Rebecca was not at all responsible for the defeat, and Trump had enough evidence to fire both Brian and Marshawn for their terrible performances without the need for a final boardroom.
  - Firing Verdict:
    - Trump was dumbfounded that Brian would think that fifteen minutes was enough time to get across Manhattan, especially as a Murray Hill resident.
    - When Carolyn brought up the issue of Marshawn choosing not to present, Marshawn became extremely evasive upon questioning by Trump and his advisers. After being caught lying that Rebecca took the role of presenting out from under her, Marshawn then pivoted to claiming that Brian would do a better job (which Brian immediately refuted). It was clear Marshawn had no valid reasoning for her decision to back out of presenting (other than just not wanting to do it) and Bill accused her of abandoning the team by not showcasing her public speaking skills. Trump was further disappointed when Marshawn downplayed the task altogether because it was "just about a store display", which he pointed out that most creatives would jump at the chance to produce something for a franchise as big as Star Wars.
  - Fired: Brian Mandelbaum and Marshawn Evans for the following reasons:
    - Brian Mandelbaum - for his terrible leadership, poor time management, depending too much on Randal throughout the task, arriving late to the meeting and missing the meeting with the Lucasfilm and Best Buy executives for the wrong reasons (which was the main reason why they failed), and a generally very poor track record over the course of the interview process.
    - Marshawn Evans - for refusing to do the presentation, making a variety of excuses in response for doing so, and maintaining a negative attitude throughout this task. While Trump did not feel that she was directly to blame for the loss, her blatant dishonesty and disdain for the project as a whole was enough for him to realize she would be unsuitable for his organization.
- Notes:
  - This is the third time that two or more people have been fired on The Apprentice. The first occurrence was in Season 2, Week 11 (Wes and Maria) and the second in Season 4, Week 6 (Josh, Jennifer M., James, and Mark).
  - This is also the second time this season that more than one person has been fired, making the event an Apprentice first. Trump actually felt Marshawn had been a strong performer and had great potential, but her choosing to not present and her subsequent lies about her actions sealed her fate.
  - Unlike the previous multiple-firing in week 6, in which he fired all four of Josh, Jennifer M., James, and Mark all at once, he fired Brian and Marshawn one at a time; Brian was fired first.
  - Trump took a verbal shot at Brian before firing him saying: "You want to go home? It's only 40 blocks up the road."
  - Carolyn seemed unsure about Marshawn's firing after the final boardroom, but Trump "hated" the fact that Marshawn abandoned her team and had no enthusiasm for the task. Bill agreed and Trump said "only the best can work here" to which Carolyn nodded.
  - Trump took an additional parting shot at Brian after firing him by saying: "At least you'll be home in 15 minutes."
  - As with the previous multiple-firing in week 6, both Brian and Marshawn had to share a single taxi. During the exit interview Marshawn blamed Brian for the loss while Brian never spoke a word and sat with his back toward Marshawn.
  - Episode 8 Recap from NBC.com

=== Week 9: One Hit Blunder ===
- Airdate: November 17, 2005
- Sponsor: XM Radio
  - Corporate shuffle: Clay asked Trump if he could move from Capital Edge to Excel because he did not like the way Adam, Alla, and Felisha were treating him. Trump agreed, and Clay joined Randal and Rebecca.
- Task: The teams had to choose an unsigned singer and create a song for them to sing. The song would be aired on XM Radio Café channel and critiqued by listeners who called in. Capital Edge worked with Levi Kreis and Excel worked with Jide .
- Judges: Donald Trump; Carolyn Kepcher; George H. Ross
- Trump Monologue: Creative Balance - It is a great businessperson that can decide between practicality and creativity. You have to strike a balance.
- Capital Edge project manager: Felisha
- Excel project manager: Rebecca
- Winning team: Capital Edge
  - Reasons for win: Capital Edge successfully worked as a trio and managed to create a well-received pop rock song, despite the band having a more established jazz background.
  - Capital Edge's reward: A private helicopter tour of popular New York City buildings with Trump.
- Losing team: Excel
  - Reasons for loss: Instead of alternative rock, which XM radio Café specializes in, Excel decided to change genre and created a song that was not popular with the XM radio Café listeners. In addition, Randal had the radio channel listed wrong on the team's marketing material poster. Rebecca was also tense during their presentation, which was attributed to Clay's disrespectful behavior weighing on her throughout the task.
  - Sent to boardroom: No final boardroom – While Trump considered all three responsible for the loss, Trump noted that Rebecca and Randal had been outstanding throughout the process, whereas Clay was repeatedly singled out for being a negative force towards his teammates and his Project Manager/Team Leader and routinely insubordinate. Trump ultimately chose to give Randal and Rebecca another chance, which sealed Clay's fate.
  - Fired: Clay Lee - for having a terrible attitude, refusing to take any responsibility for his actions, and being too difficult to work with throughout the whole process. Trump felt that all of the members of Excel were equally responsible for the loss, but ultimately fired Clay based on his history of not getting along with others and making no improvement in that regard.
- Notes:
  - Exemptions are no longer issued. Randal was the last person in Apprentice history to receive an exemption.
  - Clay happily volunteered to move to Excel following the double firing the previous week. Trump accepted his offer, but Clay implicated himself when Capital Edge became very ecstatic after Clay left the team, saying they would never want to work with him ever again.
  - Both Rebecca and Randal were in serious danger of also being fired, due to Rebecca losing twice as a project manager and Randal because Trump considered the error over the channel number to be such a basic mistake that it was grounds for instant dismissal. It was strongly implied that Randal's honesty over the error (compared to Clay's refusal to admit making any significant mistakes in the task) played a major part in his survival.
  - This is the last episode in which Capital Edge wins a task.
- Episode 9 Recap from NBC.com

=== Week 10: Shaniagans ===
- Airdate: November 24, 2005
- Prologue: Following the previous boardroom session, Randal stepped up to be Project Manager on the following task as he felt that he needed to prove himself after he made a fatal mistake on the XM Radio task.
- Sponsor: Coty, Inc.
- Project: The teams have to wrap an object to promote country pop music star Shania Twain's new fragrance by Stetson. The team with the most calls and votes wins.
- Judges: Donald Trump; Carolyn Kepcher; Bill Rancic
- Trump Monologue Be A Gladiator - There are times where the only choice is a confrontation. Confrontation is not popular, but sometimes it is needed. Do it with confidence and do it with gusto.
- Capital Edge project manager: Alla
- Excel project manager: Randal
  - Dramatic Tension: When Randal called Radio Shack to ask for megaphones, the assistant told him another group of people (Capital Edge) called in for megaphones. Randal and Rebecca engaged in a "Megaphone Heist". This is the turning point of the task. Randall and Rebecca pretended to be Capital Edge's "colleagues" and went into the store to pick them up "for them". Randall and Rebecca left with only nine instead of 10 because the tenth megaphone was set up in a display window and Rebecca was nervous of Capital Edge coming in and spotting them. When Alla called to check on Capital Edge's megaphones, the receptionist told them they had already given them to Excel.
- Winning team: Excel
  - Reasons for victory: Excel ended up with 978 calls. The key to their victory was sabotaging Capital Edge by stealing the megaphones they ordered for their temp workers to use.
  - Excel's reward: A horseback ride through Central Park and dinner with Shania Twain.
- Losing team: Capital Edge
  - Reasons for loss: Capital Edge was only five calls short from Excel. Felisha was forced to cut the number of temps they wanted after Adam wasted their budget on the horseback riding theme.
  - Sent to boardroom: Adam and Felisha. - In a series first, Alla was dismissed from the final boardroom. While Alla was the unsuccessful project manager, it was established that she was the strongest force on the team.
  - Fired: Adam Israelov - for spending 70% of his team's budget on horse and carriages that looked awful and were not effective. While it was discussed that Felisha did not hire enough temp workers, Adam was deemed the weakest of the remaining five candidates and did not have enough stand-out strength to defend himself.
- Notes:
  - Carolyn stated in the initial boardroom that Felicia was the weakest candidate out of the final five, which offended her.
  - Alla is the first and only project manager (to date) not to face the boardroom, since Trump did not consider her responsible for the loss.
  - As this episode aired on Thanksgiving weekend, a one-hour highlight package of previously unaired footage and a summary was shown.
- Episode 10 Recap from NBC.com

=== Week 11: To Lead or Not to Lead ===
- Airdate: December 1, 2005
- Sponsor: Microsoft
- Project: The teams had to direct a commercial promoting Microsoft's Live Meeting program.
- Judges: Donald Trump; Carolyn Kepcher; Bill Rancic
- Trump Monologue Family - Family is very important in business, over the years Trump has seen many successful people who have a lot going but they aren't necessarily happy. The people who are most content are the ones with good family.
- Capital Edge project manager: Felisha
- Excel project manager: Rebecca
- Winning team: Excel
  - Reasons for win: Microsoft loved the story-themed concept and Rebecca and Randal's roles in the commercial. Rebecca had initially hired actors for the project but was unsatisfied with their performance, forcing Randal and Rebecca to perform the script themselves. In addition. they showcased many of the program's features, including the brand messaging.
  - Excel's reward: A private sailboat ride around New York City. Randal received a surprise visit by his wife Zahara, and Rebecca received a surprise visit by her boyfriend Matt.
- Losing team: Capital Edge
  - Reasons for loss: Although Capital Edge had great brand messaging, their story line was a bit complex to follow through the commercial. Plus, the executives did not hold their attention of the program's features when the commercial had too much text going at once, which gave them a difficult impression to follow. In the end, they focused on creating visual effects, as opposed to communicating to the people in using the program of Microsoft Live Meeting. Trump felt this was not even close.
  - Initial Boardroom: Carolyn described the commercial as having too much information, and Bill criticized them for chopping & cutting the commercial up, as a "catastrophic mistake".
  - Sent to boardroom: No final boardroom - During the boardroom, Alla and Felisha argued at each other, causing Felisha to break into tears. This occurred despite their supposed friendship. Trump told Alla that she was unmanageable, citing that Alla acts like a bully even though Felisha is nice to her. Felisha was the only one expected to be fired, but when Alla attempted to escape from the boardroom right after Felisha was fired, Trump told her to sit back down and fired her as well.
  - Fired: Both of them were fired, for the following reasons:
    - Felisha Mason - for not being emotionally strong enough to handle the tough and cutthroat acumen of New York City, her weak leadership, and for losing control of Alla.
    - Alla Wartenburg - for her insubordination, and for producing and directing a horrid commercial, along with brutally attacking Felisha in the boardroom.
- Notes:
  - This is the third multiple firing conducted this season.
  - All of the contestants who were spared from the previous final Boardroom (Alla, Randall and Rebecca) agreed that Adam should be the next person fired, with Alla being vocal about how much she wanted Felisha to come back and loudly expressing her happiness when she did.
  - Season four had the most multiple-firings in one season of The Apprentice ever (all multiple-firings were unannounced).
  - This is the first time the finalists have been decided by an unannounced multiple-firing alone before the one-on-one interviews with the four prominent executives.
  - This is the second time in the series that Trump fired every candidate in the boardroom at the time. The first time was in week 6, when he fired all four of Excel's members (Josh, Jennifer M., James, and Mark).
  - Unlike the week 6 multiple-firing, and similar to the week 8 multiple-firing, Trump fired Felisha and Alla one at a time; Felisha was fired first.
  - Capital Edge is the first team in the history of The Apprentice to be completely out of business before the one-on-one interviews, because there are no more Capital Edge members.
  - The turning point during this task was when Felisha and Alla butt heads during the acting part of the task, where Felisha failed to halt Alla's insubordination.
  - Right after Felisha was fired, Alla was about to escape from the boardroom, and Trump told her to sit back down and fired her as well.
  - Ironically, prior to the boardroom, Felisha had given serious consideration to resigning rather than allowing herself to be fired, as she did not think Trump was likely to fire Alla, but Alla's verbal attacks motivated Felisha into defending herself.
  - After the boardroom, Trump went back upstairs to the suite to inform Randal and Rebecca that they are the Final Two.
  - As with the previous two multiple-firings in week 6 and week 8, both Felisha and Alla had to share a single taxi.
  - After the task, and before the Boardroom, Randal had a 7–4 record in the 11 tasks. The women were 4–7 a piece. Alla was 1–1 as Project Manager, Felisha and Rebecca were 1–2 each. Randal had the best record with 3–0.
  - Normally, when there is only three or four candidates remaining, there would be an interview process in which Trump (at the behest of the executives) determines whether or not a candidate would be eligible to participate in the final task. For this season, when there was four candidates left, Trump decided to do a regular task, and save the interview week for when there were only three candidates remaining, but this season, there will not be an interview week since the number of candidates went down from four straight to two, as Trump fired both of the losing team's remaining team members.
  - This is the first time that two candidates that were interrupted by reward-related injuries and family-related issues refused to quit, even though they were offered a chance to do so.
  - Both commercials are available at Microsoft's official Live Meeting webpage
- Episode 11 Recap from NBC.com

=== Week 12: The Final Showdown ===
- Airdate: December 8, 2005
- Sponsor: Yahoo! and Outback Steakhouse
- Finalists: Rebecca and Randal
- Judges: Donald Trump; Carolyn Kepcher; George H. Ross
- Task Dossier for Rebecca: Work with Yahoo! to host a comedy event raising money for the Elizabeth Glaser Pediatric AIDS Foundation.
  - Rebecca's Recruits: Chris, James, and Toral
- Task Dossier for Randal: Work with Outback Steakhouse to host a celebrity softball tournament for Autism Speaks.
  - Randal's Recruits: Josh, Mark, and Marshawn
- Notes:
  - There are no more teams from this point on— Randal and Rebecca are on their own.
    - Corporation names were used in the final task for the first time in Apprentice history—previously no corporation names would be used on the Final Task
    - Capital Edge "re-opened for business under new ownership and management"—with Rebecca as the sole candidate of the corporation
    - Randal is now the sole candidate of Excel, even though in the last task team names would not be used
  - Because Trump fired both Felisha and Alla at the end of Week 11, Season 4 is the first season that does not require one-on-one interviews with the prominent executives.
  - This is the first time that Donald visited the candidates' suite on camera in lieu of declaring both Randal and Rebecca The Final Two.
  - As opposed to Season 3 which recruits were assigned, Randal and Rebecca were allowed to choose their recruits. Randal had originally chosen Josh, James and Mark, while Rebecca chose Josh, James and Chris. Rebecca and Randal compromised that she could have James and he would get Josh. Randal then decided the wanted Chris as well, so they flipped a coin and Rebecca "won" Chris. Then Rebecca chose Toral and Randal chose Marshawn for their third recruit.
    - As recalled from Season 1 of The Apprentice, Bill Rancic and Kwame Jackson were allowed to choose their teams, but they were only allowed to choose among the last six fired candidates from that season (Amy, Katrina, and Nick for Bill and Heidi, Omarosa, and Troy for Kwame).
    - For this season, Randal and Rebecca could choose from any of the 16 already-fired candidates, regardless of what position they finished in.
  - As promised, the tasks were quite challenging, with obstacles that included executives threatening to pull out from the event planning project, acts of God (there was a thunderstorm and a very loud lightning flash shown at the end of the episode), and the need to entirely rejigger the venue.
    - After Trump fired Felisha and Alla, he went up to the suite and told Randal and Rebecca to meet George and Carolyn at a restaurant. Trump told both to enjoy themselves because he promised "the last task would be hell".
  - Both Randal and Rebecca reserved the right to re-fire any recruits should for any reason the recruits displease either of them.
- Episode 12 Recap from NBC.com

=== Week 13: Decision Time ===
- Airdate: December 15, 2005
- Preface: Aired live at the Alice Tully Hall within the Lincoln Center limits at New York City before a televised audience, with the remainder of the final task pre-recorded
- Project: Picks up from where the obstacles started to ensue from Week 12
  - Weather was a threat for Randal—Randal had no choice but to hold the event indoors, not just because of the rain, but because the cold weather as well.
  - Desertion was a threat for Rebecca—Rebecca was forced to utilize a Plan B.
- Outcome:
  - Rebecca hired a new comedian, but fails to raise money for the Elizabeth Glaser AIDS Foundation
  - Randal forced the charity event inside. He failed to check the weather and used cramped space, but raised money for Autism Speaks.
- Boardroom: Each of the six recruits get to discuss their bosses, then both Randal and Rebecca had to defend their performance in the final boardroom.
- Decision: Aired live before a televised audience
  - Toral defended Rebecca since Rebecca did the same for Toral, Trump replied that Toral better defend Rebecca since Rebecca worked really hard for Toral. Trump also stated he agreed with Toral for the first time (he fired Toral on the spot in week 4, see above).
  - Marshawn was the most impartial of the "opinion board"—she gave neutral reasons why Randal should be hired.
  - While Jennifer M. said she really liked Rebecca, Jen M. preferred Randal citing Randal's natural-born leader tendencies.
  - Alla said she preferred Randal and accused Rebecca of being the weakest link. Alla said she saw nothing in Rebecca.
- Fired: Rebecca Jarvis - mainly for her donation method. Additionally, Rebecca has a mediocre team record of 4-7 and mediocre PM record of 1–2.
  - Although it appeared that Randal was Trump's first choice, Rebecca seemed to be a close second choice until Randal made a controversial comment that Trump should not hire Rebecca.
- Hired: Randal Pinkett - for raising $11,000 for Autism Speaks and having a 3–0 record as Project Manager.
  - What is next for Randal: Renovation of the chain of Trump Casinos at Atlantic City.
- Notes:
  - As with season three, the two projects were described prior to Trump's decision; in seasons one and two, they were always presented to the hiree after he or she was crowned. Trump asked each finalist which project they would choose if they were hired.
    - Choice 1 was the Trump Casino renovation spree at Atlantic City (Chosen by Randal)
    - Choice 2 was the Trump Tower project at Jersey City, New Jersey (Chosen by Rebecca)
  - A twist at the end was that Trump asked Randal if he would also hire Rebecca into the Trump organization, an Apprentice first.
    - Although Trump said he could have been convinced that Rebecca should also be hired, Randal recommended that Trump rescind that idea, citing that the premise of the "ultimate job interview" was to hire "only one candidate," not two; Randal suggested that hiring Rebecca would prompt the show's name to be changed into "The Apprenti".

At Randal's recommendation, Trump rescinded what could have been the first multiple-hiring and a US Apprentice first. Throughout the following week, many were critical of Randal's decision. In an interview with Larry King, Randal defended his decision and said he had no objection to Trump hiring Rebecca at a later date.

- Series web sponsor Yahoo!, to make up for discouraging Rebecca from requesting donations during the task (although Rebecca could have held other fundraising events, such as a silent auction), opted to raise money for the Elizabeth Glaser AIDS Foundation through their website. They also pledged $50,000 to both charities presented on the show.
  - On The Today Show after the finale, Rebecca received an offer from Wenda Millard (one of the Yahoo! associates who oversaw Rebecca's final task) to write for Yahoo! Finance. The show's official Web site is held at Yahoo!
  - Rebecca appeared at the final boardroom without crutches, as it was clearly evident the entire series had been taped in a span of 45 days, and she had completely recovered from the injury by the December live final.
  - Heidi Bressler from the 1st season covered the finale for Fox Reality Channel and conducted interviews with Carolyn Kepcher and Donald Trump. In the former, Carolyn was amused by Heidi's declaration that the women did not like Rebecca and did not want her to defeat Randall; in the latter, Trump told Heidi about the future of the show, breaking the news that after a 5th season in NYC the 6th season would take place in Los Angeles. Jennifer Oberting (née Crisafulli) from Season 2 briefly appeared on camera because she was hanging out with Heidi during the event, but Trump was visibly unhappy on seeing her, and actually moved where he was standing during his chat with Heidi so that his position blocked Jennifer out of the scene's frame.
- Episode 13 Recap from NBC.com
