= Alan Reuber =

American football player (born 1981)

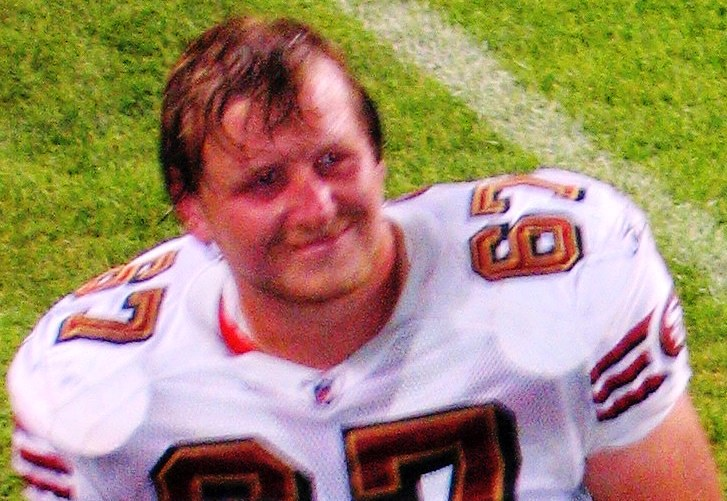
- Reuber at a 2008 preseason game

No. 66
- Position: Guard

Personal information
- Born: January 26, 1981 (age 45); Cleveland, Ohio, U.S.
- Listed height: 6 ft 6 in (1.98 m)
- Listed weight: 307 lb (139 kg)

Career information
- High school: Plano (Plano, Texas)
- College: Texas A&M
- NFL draft: 2004: undrafted

Career history
- Minnesota Vikings (2004)*; Arizona Cardinals (2004–2005); Cincinnati Bengals (2006–2007)*; Tampa Bay Buccaneers (2007)*; San Francisco 49ers (2008)*
- * Offseason or practice squad member only
- Stats at Pro Football Reference

Alan Michael Reuber (born January 26, 1981) is an American former professional football guard in the National Football League. He played college football for the Texas A&M Aggies. He was signed by the Minnesota Vikings as an undrafted free agent in 2004, but was released. He was then signed by the Arizona Cardinals and spent the season as a backup left tackle on the 53-man roster. Reuber was released the next season by Arizona, but would spend parts of the next two seasons on the Cardinals practice squad. Reuber was also a member of the Cincinnati Bengals and Tampa Bay Buccaneers. He was also in camp with the San Francisco 49ers in 2008.
