= 2020 United States presidential election in Texas =

- November 3, 2020
- Turnout: 66.73% (of registered voters) (▲7.3 pp); 52.39% (of voting age population)

Nominee	Donald Trump	Joe Biden
Party	Republican	Democratic
Home state	Florida	Delaware
Running mate	Mike Pence	Kamala Harris
Electoral vote	38	0
Popular vote	5,890,347	5,259,126
Percentage	52.06%	46.48%

Trump
40–50%
50–60%
60–70%
70–80%
80–90%
90–100%
Biden
40–50%
50–60%
60–70%
70–80%
80–90%
90–100%
President before election
Donald Trump
Republican
Elected President
Joe Biden
Democratic

The 2020 United States presidential election in Texas was held on Tuesday, November 3, 2020, as part of the 2020 United States presidential election in which all 50 states plus the District of Columbia participated. Texas has historically voted Republican, but recent demographic shifts have made the voter turnout more competitive. Texas voters chose electors to represent them in the Electoral College via a popular vote, pitting the Republican Party's nominee, incumbent President Donald Trump, and running mate, Vice President Mike Pence, against the Democratic Party's nominee, former Vice President Joe Biden, and his running mate, California Senator Kamala Harris. The state of Texas had 38 electoral votes in the Electoral College.

Although it was considered a vulnerable state for Trump by some pollsters and experts and a potential upset victory for Biden due to its recent demographic trends, Texas was again won by Trump with 52.1% of the vote, roughly the same percentage he carried it with in 2016.

Despite not winning the state, Biden improved on Hillary Clinton's 2016 vote share by 3.24 points, with his 46.48% vote share the largest percentage in the state by a Democratic presidential candidate since Jimmy Carter carried the state in 1976. Trump's 5.58% margin of victory was the narrowest for a Republican since 1996, when Southerner Bill Clinton was the Democratic nominee.

Texas was the third-narrowest of Trump's state victories, behind only Florida and North Carolina, and the ninth-closest state overall. However, Trump made many of his largest gains in the country in South Texas in counties along the Mexico–United States border, flipping eight counties in the region.

Voter turnout in the state increased to its highest level since 1992, when two Texans, George H. W. Bush and Ross Perot, were on the ballot.

== Primary elections ==
=== Republican primary ===
The Republican primary was held on March 3, 2020. Donald Trump and Bill Weld were the only declared Republican candidates, as former South Carolina Governor and U.S. Representative Mark Sanford and U.S. Representative Joe Walsh had dropped out. Texas governor Greg Abbott declined to run against Trump, as did 2016 Republican primary candidate and current senator Ted Cruz. The primary was won markedly by Trump with over 94% of the vote.

2020 Texas Republican Party presidential primary
Candidate	Popular vote		Delegates
Candidate	Count	Percentage	Delegates
Donald Trump (incumbent)	1,898,664	94.13%	117
Uncommitted	71,803	3.56%	0
Bill Weld	15,739	0.78%	0
Joe Walsh	15,824	0.78%	0
Rocky De La Fuente	7,563	0.38%	0
Bob Ely	3,582	0.37%	0
Matthew Matern	3,525	0.18%	0
Zoltan Istvan	1,447	0.07%	0
Total:	2,017,167	100%	155

=== Democratic primary ===
The Democratic primary was held on March 3, 2020. Elizabeth Warren, Bernie Sanders, Michael Bloomberg and Joe Biden were among the major declared candidates. The primary was won by Biden, with Sanders coming second.

Results by county, showing the candidate receiving the most votes in each county. Joe Biden Bernie Sanders Michael Bloomberg Elizabeth Warren Tie

2020 Texas Democratic presidential primary
Candidate	Votes	%	Delegates
Joe Biden	725,562	34.64	113
Bernie Sanders	626,339	29.91	99
Michael Bloomberg	300,608	14.35	11
Elizabeth Warren	239,237	11.42	5
Pete Buttigieg (withdrawn) (Note: Candidate withdrew shortly before the primary after early voting had already started.)	82,671	3.95	
Amy Klobuchar (withdrawn)	43,291	2.07	
Julian Castro (withdrawn)	16,688	0.80	
Tom Steyer (withdrawn)	13,929	0.67	
Michael Bennet (withdrawn)	10,324	0.49	
Tulsi Gabbard	8,688	0.41	
Andrew Yang (withdrawn)	6,674	0.32	
Cory Booker (withdrawn)	4,941	0.24	
Marianne Williamson (withdrawn)	3,918	0.19	
John Delaney (withdrawn)	3,280	0.16	
Deval Patrick (withdrawn)	1,304	0.06	
Other candidates	6,974	0.33	
Total	2,094,428	100%	228

== General election ==
=== Final predictions ===
Source	Ranking
The Cook Political Report	Tossup
Inside Elections	Tossup
Sabato's Crystal Ball	Lean R
Politico	Lean R
RCP	Tossup
Niskanen	Tossup
CNN	Lean R
The Economist	Lean R
CBS News	Lean R
270towin	Lean R
ABC News	Tossup
NPR	Tossup
NBC News	Tossup
538	Lean R

=== Polling ===
==== Graphical summary ====
View source data.

==== Aggregate polls ====
Source of poll aggregation	Dates administered	Dates updated	Joe Biden Democratic	Donald Trump Republican	Other/ Undecided (Note: Calculated by taking the difference of 100% and all other candidates combined.)	Margin
270 to Win	Oct 29, 2020 – November 2, 2020	November 3, 2020	47.5%	48.8%	3.7%	Trump +1.3
Real Clear Politics	October 20–31, 2020	November 3, 2020	46.5%	47.8%	5.7%	Trump +1.3
FiveThirtyEight	until November 2, 2020	November 3, 2020	47.4%	48.6%	4.0%	Trump +1.1
Average			47.1%	48.4%	4.5%	Trump +1.2

==== Polls ====
Poll source	Date(s) administered	Sample size (Note: Key: A – all adults RV – registered voters LV – likely voters V – unclear)	Margin of error	Donald Trump Republican	Joe Biden Democratic	Jo Jorgensen Libertarian	Howie Hawkins Green	Other	Undecided
SurveyMonkey/Axios	Oct 20 – Nov 2, 2020	9,226 (LV)	± 1.5%	51% (Note: Overlapping sample with the previous SurveyMonkey/Axios poll, but more information available regarding sample size)	47%	–	–	–	–
Swayable	Oct 27 – Nov 1, 2020	1,151 (LV)	± 3.9%	51%	47%	1%	0%	–	–
Data For Progress	Oct 27 – Nov 1, 2020	926 (LV)	± 3.2%	48%	49%	1%	1%	0% (Note: "Other candidate or write-in" with 0%)	–
AtlasIntel	Oct 30–31, 2020	686 (LV)	± 4%	50%	47%	–	–	3%	–
Emerson College	Oct 29–31, 2020	763 (LV)	± 3.5%	49% (Note: With voters who lean towards a given candidate)	48%	-	-	2% (Note: "Someone else" with 2%)	–
Morning Consult	Oct 22–31, 2020	3,267 (LV)	± 2%	48%	48%	–	–	–	–
Public Policy Polling	Oct 28–29, 2020	775 (V)	–	48%	50%	–	–	–	2%
Gravis Marketing	Oct 27–28, 2020	670 (LV)	± 3.8%	50%	45%	–	–	–	5%
RMG Research/PoliticalIQ	Oct 27–28, 2020	800 (LV)	± 3.5%	50% (Note: Standard VI response)	46%	–	–	2%	2%
RMG Research/PoliticalIQ	Oct 27–28, 2020	800 (LV)	± 3.5%	48% (Note: Results generated with high Democratic turnout model)	48%	–	–	2%	2%
RMG Research/PoliticalIQ	Oct 27–28, 2020	800 (LV)	± 3.5%	52% (Note: Results generated with high Republican turnout model)	44%	–	–	2%	2%
SurveyMonkey/Axios	Oct 1–28, 2020	15,145 (LV)	–	51%	47%	–	–	–	–
Swayable	Oct 23–26, 2020	552 (LV)	± 5.7%	49%	48%	3%	1%	–	–
YouGov/UMass Amherst	Oct 20–26, 2020	873 (LV)	± 4.2%	48%	47%	2%	1%	0% (Note: "Another candidate" with no voters)	1%
Data for Progress (D)	Oct 22–25, 2020	1,018 (LV)	± 3.1%	48%	49%	1%	0%	–	2%
Siena College/NYT Upshot	Oct 20–25, 2020	802 (LV)	± 3.8%	47%	43%	3%	0%	2% (Note: "Someone else" and would not vote with 1%)	5% (Note: Includes "Refused")
Univision/University of Houston/Latino; Decisions/North Star Opinion Research	Oct 17–25, 2020	758 (RV)	± 3.56%	49%	46%	–	–	3% (Note: "Someone else" with 3%)	2%
Citizen Data	Oct 17–20, 2020	1,000 (LV)	± 3%	45%	49%	1%	0%	1%	4%
YouGov/University of Houston	Oct 13–20, 2020	1,000 (LV)	± 3.1%	50%	45%	2%	0%	–	3%
University of Texas at Tyler/Dallas Morning News	Oct 13–20, 2020	925 (LV)	± 3.2%	47%	49%	3%	1%	–	1%
Morning Consult	Oct 11–20, 2020	3,347 (LV)	± 1.7%	47%	48%	–	–	–	–
Quinnipiac University	Oct 16–19, 2020	1,145 (LV)	± 2.9%	47%	47%	–	–	1% (Note: "Someone else" with 1%)	5%
Data for Progress (D)	Oct 15–18, 2020	933 (LV)	± 3.2%	46%	47%	2%	1%	–	5%
Morning Consult	Oct 2–11, 2020	3,455 (LV)	± 1.7%	49%	47%	–	–	–	3%
Public Policy Polling/Texas Democrats (Note: Poll sponsored by the Texas arm of the party which nominated Biden prior to this poll's sampling period)	Oct 7–8, 2020	721 (LV)	± 3.6%	48%	48%	–	–	–	1%
YouGov/CCES	Sep 29 – Oct 7, 2020	2,947 (LV)	–	49%	47%	–	–	–	–
Morning Consult	Sep 28 – Oct 7, 2020	~2,700 (LV)	± 2%	49%	46%	–	–	–	–
Pulse Opinion Research/Rasmussen Reports/Crosswind PR	Oct 5–6, 2020	1,000 (LV)	± 3%	51%	44%	–	–	–	–
Civiqs/Daily Kos	Oct 3–6, 2020	895 (LV)	± 3.4%	48%	48%	–	–	2%	1%
Data For Progress (D)	Sep 30 – Oct 5, 2020	1,949 (LV)	± 2.2%	45%	47%	2%	1%	–	5%
YouGov/University of Texas/Texas Tribune	Sep 25 – Oct 4, 2020	908 (LV)	± 3.25%	50%	45%	2%	2%	1%	–
EMC Research/Blue Texas PAC (Note: The Blue Texas PAC exclusively supports Democratic candidates)	Sep 27 – Oct 2, 2020	848 (LV)	–	49%	49%	–	–	–	–
SurveyMonkey/Axios	Sep 1–30, 2020	13,395 (LV)	–	52%	46%	–	–	–	2%
Hart Research Associates/Human Rights Campaign (Note: The Human Rights Campaign endorsed Biden prior to this poll's sampling period)	Sep 24–27, 2020	400 (LV)	± 4.9%	49%	47%	–	–	–	–
Morning Consult	Sep 18–27, 2020	~2,700 (LV)	± 2%	48%	47%	–	–	–	–
Public Policy Polling/Texas Democrats (Note: Poll sponsored by the Texas arm of the party which nominated Biden prior to this poll's sampling period)	Sep 25–26, 2020	612 (LV)	± 3.6%	48%	48%	–	–	–	4%
YouGov/UMass Lowell	Sep 18–25, 2020	882 (LV)	± 4.3%	49% (Note: Standard IV response)	46%	2%	1%	1% (Note: "Another candidate" with 1%)	1%
YouGov/UMass Lowell	Sep 18–25, 2020	882 (LV)	± 4.3%	50% (Note: With only Biden, Trump and "another candidate" as options)	46%	–	–	2% (Note: "Another candidate" with 2%)	2%
Data For Progress (Note: Poll sponsored by the Defend Students Action Fund.)	Sep 18–22, 2020	726 (LV)	± 3.6%	47%	45%	–	–	–	9%
Siena College/NYT Upshot	Sep 16–22, 2020	653 (LV)	± 4.3%	46%	43%	1%	1%	0% (Note: "Someone else" and would not vote with 0%)	9%
Quinnipiac University	Sep 17–21, 2020	1,078 (LV)	± 3%	50%	45%	–	–	No voters	4%
YouGov/CBS	Sep 15–18, 2020	1,129 (LV)	± 3.5%	48%	46%	–	–	2% (Note: "Someone else/third party" with 2%)	4%
Morning Consult	Sep 8–17, 2020	~2,700 (LV)	± 2%	47%	47%	–	–	–	–
Morning Consult	Aug 29 – Sep 7, 2020	2,829 (LV)	± 2%	46% (Note: Overlapping sample with the previous Morning Consult poll, but more information available regarding sample size)	46%	–	–	–	–
Public Policy Polling/Giffords (Note: Giffords' founder, Gabby Giffords, endorsed Biden prior to this poll's sampling period)	Sep 1–2, 2020	743 (V)	–	48%	47%	–	–	–	5%
University of Texas at Tyler/Dallas Morning News	Aug 28 – Sep 2, 2020	901 (LV)	± 3.26%	49%	47%	1%	1%	1%	–
SurveyMonkey/Axios	Aug 1–31, 2020	12,607 (LV)	–	52%	46%	–	–	–	2%
Morning Consult	Aug 21–30, 2020	2,632 (LV)	± 2%	48%	47%	–	–	–	–
Tyson Group/Consumer Energy Alliance (Note: The Consumer Energy Alliance is a pro-Keystone XL lobbying group)	Aug 20–25, 2020	906 (LV)	± 3%	44%	48%	0%	–	0% (Note: "Refused" with 0%)	5%
Data for Progress/Texas Youth Power Alliance	Aug 20–25, 2020	2,295 (LV)	± 2.0%	45%	48%	–	–	–	8%
Public Policy Polling/Texas Democrats (Note: The Texas Democratic Party exclusively supports Democratic candidates)	Aug 21–22, 2020	764 (RV)	± 3.6%	47%	48%	–	–	–	5%
Morning Consult	Aug 13–22, 2020	~2,700 (LV)	± 2%	48%	47%	–	–	–	–
Morning Consult	Aug 7–16, 2020	2,559 (LV)	± 2%	47% (Note: Overlapping sample with the previous and subsequent Morning Consult polls, but more information available regarding sample size)	46%	–	–	–	–
Global Strategy Group/Chrysta for Texas (Note: Poll sponsored by Chrysta Castañeda's campaign)	Aug 11–13, 2020	700 (LV)	± 3.7%	45%	47%	–	–	–	–
YouGov/Texas Hispanic Policy Foundation/Rice University's Baker Institute	Aug 4–13, 2020	846 (RV)	–	48%	41%	1%	1%	–	10.2%
YouGov/Texas Hispanic Policy Foundation/Rice University's Baker Institute	Aug 4–13, 2020	– (LV) (Note: Size of "extremely likely to vote" sample not yet released)	–	50%	44%	1%	0%	–	5%
Trafalgar Group (R)	Aug 1–5, 2020	1,015 (LV)	± 3.0%	49%	43%	2%	–	2% (Note: "Another party candidate" with 2%)	3%
Morning Consult	Aug 3–12, 2020	~2,700 (LV)	± 2.0%	47%	46%	–	–	–	–
Morning Consult	Jul 24 – Aug 2, 2020	2,576 (LV)	± 2.0%	46%	47%	–	–	2%	5%
SurveyMonkey/Axios	Jul 1–31, 2020	13,721 (LV)	–	52%	46%	–	–	–	2%
Morning Consult	Jul 17–26, 2020	2,685 (LV)	± 1.9%	45%	47%	–	–	–	–
Morning Consult	Jul 16–25, 2020	≈2,700 (LV) (Note: Not yet released)	± 2.0%	45%	47%	–	–	–	–
Spry Strategies/American Principles Project (Note: This poll's sponsor is the American Principles Project, a 501(c)(4) organization that supports the Republican Party.)	Jul 16–20, 2020	750 (LV)	± 3.5%	49%	45%	–	–	–	6%
Quinnipiac University	Jul 16–20, 2020	880 (RV)	± 3.3%	44%	45%	–	–	7% (Note: "Someone else" with 4%; would not vote with 3%)	4%
Morning Consult	Jul 6–15, 2020	– (LV)	–	46%	46%	–	–	–	–
YouGov/CBS	Jul 7–10, 2020	1,185 (LV)	± 3.6%	46%	45%	–	–	4% (Note: "Someone else/third party" with 4%; would not vote with 0%)	6%
Gravis Marketing/OANN	Jul 7, 2020	591 (LV)	± 4.3%	46%	44%	–	–	–	–
Dallas Morning News/University of Texas at Tyler	Jun 29 – Jul 7, 2020	1,677 (LV)	± 2.4%	43%	48%	–	–	4%	5%
Morning Consult	Jun 26 – Jul 5, 2020	– (LV)	–	46%	45%	–	–	–	–
SurveyMonkey/Axios	Jun 8–30, 2020	6,669 (LV)	–	51%	46%	–	–	–	2%
YouGov/University of Texas/Texas Politics Project	Jun 19–29, 2020	1,200 (RV)	± 2.89%	48%	44%	–	–	–	8%
Public Policy Polling	Jun 24–25, 2020	729 (RV)	± 3.6%	46%	48%	–	–	–	5%
Morning Consult	Jun 16–25, 2020	– (LV)	–	47%	44%	–	–	–	–
Fox News	Jun 20–23, 2020	1,001 (RV)	± 3%	44%	45%	–	–	5% (Note: "Other" with 4%; would not vote with 1%)	5%
Public Policy Polling/Progress Texas (Note: Poll sponsored by Progress Texas, an organization promoting progressive policies)	Jun 18–19, 2020	907 (V)	± 3%	48%	46%	–	–	–	6%
Morning Consult	Jun 6–15, 2020	– (LV)	–	48%	45%	–	–	–	–
Morning Consult	May 27 – Jun 5, 2020	– (LV)	–	48%	43%	–	–	–	–
Public Policy Polling/Texas Democrats (Note: Poll sponsored by the Texas Democratic Party)	Jun 2–3, 2020	683 (V)	–	48%	48%	–	–	–	4%
Quinnipiac	May 28 – Jun 1, 2020	1,166 (RV)	± 2.9%	44%	43%	–	–	6% (Note: "Someone else" and would not vote with 3%)	7%
Morning Consult	May 17–26, 2020	2,551 (LV)	–	50%	43%	–	–	–	–
Morning Consult	May 16–25, 2020	– (LV)	–	50%	42%	–	–	–	–
Morning Consult	May 6–15, 2020	– (LV)	–	49%	43%	–	–	–	–
Emerson College	May 8–10, 2020	800 (RV)	± 3.4%	52% (Note: Including voters who lean towards a given candidate)	48%	–	–	–	–
Public Policy Polling	Apr 27–28, 2020	1,032 (V)	–	46%	47%	–	–	–	7%
Dallas Morning News/University of Texas at Tyler	Apr 18–27, 2020	1,183 (RV)	± 2.85%	43%	43%	–	–	5%	9%
University of Texas/Texas Tribune	Apr 10–19, 2020	1,200 (RV)	± 2.8%	49%	44%	–	–	–	7%
AtlasIntel	Feb 24 – Mar 2, 2020	1,100 (RV)	± 3.0%	47%	43%	–	–	11%	–
NBC News/Marist College	Feb 23–27, 2020	2,409 (RV)	± 2.5%	49%	45%	–	–	1%	5%
CNN/SSRS	Feb 22–26, 2020	1,003 (RV)	± 3.4%	47%	48%	–	–	3% (Note: Other with 1%; neither with 2%)	2%
Univision	Feb 21–26, 2020	1,004 (RV)	± 3.1%	43%	46%	–	–	–	11%
Dallas Morning News/University of Texas at Tyler	Feb 17–26, 2020	1,221 (RV)	± 2.8%	45%	44%	–	–	11%	–
YouGov/University of Texas/Texas Tribune	Jan 31 – Feb 9, 2020	1,200 (RV)	± 2.83%	47%	44%	–	–	–	10%
University of Texas at Tyler/Dallas News	Jan 21–30, 2020	910 (LV)	± 3.24%	46%	44%	–	–	10% (Note: "Neither-other" with 10%)	–
Data For Progress (Note: By the time of this poll, Data for Progress, which has worked with both the Sanders and Warren campaigns, had endorsed Warren)	Jan 16–21, 2020	1,486 (LV)	–	54%	40%	–	–	3% (Note: Would not vote with 3%)	3%
Texas Lyceum	Jan 10–19, 2020	520 (LV)	± 4.3%	51%	46%	–	–	–	3%
CNN/SSRS	Dec 4–9, 2019	1,003 (RV)	–	48%	47%	–	–	2% (Note: Other with 0%; neither with 2%)	3%
Beacon Research (R)	Nov 9–21, 2019	1,601 (RV)	± 3.0%	45%	44%	–	–	–	–
University of Texas at Tyler	Nov 5–14, 2019	1,093 (RV)	± 3.0%	45%	39%	–	–	–	16%
University of Texas/Texas Tribune	Oct 18–27, 2019	1,200 (RV)	± 2.8%	46%	39%	–	–	9% (Note: "Someone else" with 9%)	6%
University of Texas at Tyler	Sep 13–15, 2019	1,199 (RV)	± 2.8%	38%	40%	–	–	13%	9%
Univision	Aug 31 – Sep 6, 2019	1,004 (RV)	–	43%	47%	–	–	–	10%
Climate Nexus	Aug 20–25, 2019	1,660 (RV)	± 2.4%	43%	43%	–	–	–	9%
University of Texas at Tyler	Aug 1–4, 2019	1,261 (RV)	± 2.8%	37%	41%	–	–	14%	8%
Emerson	Aug 1–3, 2019	1,033 (RV)	± 3.0%	49%	51%	–	–	–	–
University of Texas at Tyler	Jul 24–27, 2019	1,414 (RV)	± 2.6%	37%	37%	–	–	12%	14%
Quinnipiac University	May 29 – Jun 4, 2019	1,159 (RV)	± 3.4%	44%	48%	–	–	1%	4%
WPA Intelligence	Apr 27–30, 2019	200 (LV)	± 6.9%	49%	42%	–	–	–	7%
Emerson College	Apr 25–28, 2019	799 (RV)	± 3.4%	50%	51%	–	–	–	–
Quinnipiac University	Feb 20–25, 2019	1,222 (RV)	± 3.4%	47%	46%	–	–	1%	5%
Public Policy Polling (D) (Note: Poll sponsored by Democracy Toolbox)	Feb 13–14, 2019	743 (RV)	± 3.6%	49%	46%	–	–	–	5%

Former candidates

Donald Trump vs. Bernie Sanders

Poll source	Date(s) administered	Sample size	Margin of error	Donald Trump (R)	Bernie Sanders (D)	Other	Undecided
AtlasIntel	Feb 24 – Mar 2, 2020	1,100 (RV)	± 3.0%	49%	43%	9%	–
NBC News/Marist College	Feb 23–27, 2020	2,409 (RV)	± 2.5%	49%	45%	1%	5%
CNN/SSRS	Feb 22–26, 2020	1,003 (RV)	± 3.4%	48%	46%	3% (Note: Other with 0%; neither with 3%)	3%
Univision	Feb 21–26, 2020	1,004 (RV)	± 3.1%	45%	45%	–	10%
Dallas Morning News/University of Texas at Tyler	Feb 17–26, 2020	1,221 (RV)	± 2.8%	45%	44%	11%	–
YouGov/University of Texas/Texas Tribune	Jan 31 – Feb 9, 2020	1,200 (RV)	± 2.83%	47%	45%	–	7%
University of Texas at Tyler/Dallas News	Jan 21–30, 2020	910 (LV)	± 3.24%	47%	42%	12% (Note: "Neither-other" with 12%)	–
Data for Progress	Jan 16–21, 2020	1,486 (LV)	–	55%	40%	3%	2%
Texas Lyceum	Jan 10–19, 2020	520 (LV)	± 4.3%	50%	47%	–	3%
CNN/SSRS	Dec 4–9, 2019	1,003 (RV)	–	50%	43%	4% (Note: Other with 1%; neither with 3%)	3%
University of Texas at Tyler	Nov 5–14, 2019	1,093 (RV)	± 3.0%	44%	40%	–	16%
University of Texas/Texas Tribune	Oct 18–27, 2019	1,200 (RV)	± 2.8%	45%	40%	9%	5%
University of Texas at Tyler	Sep 13–15, 2019	1,199 (RV)	± 2.8%	40%	38%	14%	8%
Univision	Aug 31 – Sep 6, 2019	1,004 (RV)	–	42%	48%	–	10%
Climate Nexus	Aug 20–25, 2019	1,660 (RV)	± 2.4%	45%	41%	–	7%
University of Texas at Tyler	Aug 1–4, 2019	1,261 (RV)	± 2.8%	38%	42%	13%	7%
Emerson	Aug 1–3, 2019	1,033 (RV)	± 3.0%	49%	51%	–	–
University of Texas at Tyler	Jul 24–27, 2019	1,414 (RV)	± 2.6%	37%	39%	11%	12%
Quinnipiac University	May 29 – Jun 4, 2019	1,159 (RV)	± 3.4%	47%	44%	1%	4%
Emerson College	Apr 25–28, 2019	799 (RV)	± 3.4%	51%	49%	–	–
Quinnipiac University	Feb 20–25, 2019	1,222 (RV)	± 3.4%	47%	45%	2%	4%

Donald Trump vs. Elizabeth Warren

Poll source	Date(s) administered	Sample size	Margin of error	Donald Trump (R)	Elizabeth Warren (D)	Other	Undecided
AtlasIntel	Feb 24 – Mar 2, 2020	1,100 (RV)	± 3.0%	49%	40%	12%	–
CNN/SSRS	Feb 22–26, 2020	1,003 (RV)	± 3.4%	47%	47%	2%	4%
Univision	Feb 21–26, 2020	1,004 (RV)	± 3.1%	48%	41%	–	11%
Dallas Morning News/University of Texas at Tyler	Feb 17–26, 2020	1,221 (RV)	± 2.8%	47%	37%	16%	-
YouGov/University of Texas/Texas Tribune	Jan 31 – Feb 9, 2020	1,200 (RV)	± 2.83%	47%	44%	–	9%
University of Texas at Tyler/Dallas News	Jan 21–30, 2020	907 (LV)	± 3.24%	48%	41%	12%	–
Data for Progress	Jan 16–21, 2020	1,486 (LV)	–	56%	38%	3%	3%
Texas Lyceum	Jan 10–19, 2020	520 (LV)	± 4.3%	50%	43%	–	7%
CNN/SSRS	Dec 4–9, 2019	1,003 (RV)	–	51%	44%	3%	2%
Beacon Research (R)	Nov 9–21, 2019	1,601 (RV)	± 3.0%	46%	41%	–	–
University of Texas at Tyler	Nov 5–14, 2019	1,093 (RV)	± 3.0%	46%	35%	–	20%
University of Texas/Texas Tribune	Oct 18–27, 2019	1,200 (RV)	± 2.8%	46%	39%	10% (Note: "Someone else" with 10%)	6%
University of Texas at Tyler	Sep 13–15, 2019	1,199 (RV)	± 2.8%	40%	37%	15%	9%
Univision	Aug 31 – Sep 6, 2019	1,004 (RV)	–	42%	44%	–	14%
Emerson	Aug 1–3, 2019	1,033 (RV)	± 3.0%	52%	48%	–	–
Quinnipiac University	May 29 – Jun 4, 2019	1,159 (RV)	± 3.4%	46%	45%	1%	5%
Emerson College	Apr 25–28, 2019	799 (RV)	± 3.4%	53%	47%	–	–
Quinnipiac University	Feb 20–25, 2019	1,222 (RV)	± 3.4%	48%	41%	2%	6%

Donald Trump vs. Michael Bloomberg

Poll source	Date(s) administered	Sample size	Margin of error	Donald Trump (R)	Michael Bloomberg (D)	Other	Undecided
AtlasIntel	Feb 24 – Mar 2, 2020	1,100 (RV)	± 3.0%	48%	36%	17%	–
CNN/SSRS	Feb 22–26, 2020	1,003 (RV)	± 3.4%	47%	46%	3%	4%
Univision	Feb 21–26, 2020	1,004 (RV)	± 3.1%	43%	44%	–	13%
Dallas Morning News/University of Texas at Tyler	Feb 17–26, 2020	1,221 (RV)	± 2.8%	45%	44%	10%	-
YouGov/University of Texas/Texas Tribune	Jan 31 – Feb 9, 2020	1,200 (RV)	± 2.83%	46%	41%	–	13%
University of Texas at Tyler/Dallas News	Jan 21–30, 2020	906 (LV)	± 3.24%	47%	44%	9% (Note: "Neither-other" with 9%)	–

Donald Trump vs. Amy Klobuchar

Poll source	Date(s) administered	Sample size	Margin of error	Donald Trump (R)	Amy Klobuchar (D)	Other	Undecided
CNN/SSRS	Feb 22–26, 2020	1,003 (RV)	± 3.4%	48%	45%	2%	5%
Univision	Feb 21–26, 2020	1,004 (RV)	± 3.1%	46%	39%	–	15%
Dallas Morning News/University of Texas at Tyler	Feb 17–26, 2020	1,221 (RV)	± 2.8%	45%	38%	17%	-
YouGov/University of Texas/Texas Tribune	Jan 31 – Feb 9, 2020	1,200 (RV)	± 2.83%	46%	41%	–	13%
University of Texas at Tyler/Dallas News	Jan 21–30, 2020	909 (LV)	± 3.24%	46%	38%	16% (Note: "Neither-other" with 16%)	–

Donald Trump vs. Pete Buttigieg

Poll source	Date(s) administered	Sample size	Margin of error	Donald Trump (R)	Pete Buttigieg (D)	Other	Undecided
CNN/SSRS	Feb 22–26, 2020	1,003 (RV)	± 3.4%	47%	46%	2%	4%
Univision	Feb 21–26, 2020	1,004 (RV)	± 3.1%	46%	40%	–	15%
Dallas Morning News/University of Texas at Tyler	Feb 17–26, 2020	1,221 (RV)	± 2.8%	45%	41%	15%	-
YouGov/University of Texas/Texas Tribune	Jan 31 – Feb 9, 2020	1,200 (RV)	± 2.83%	47%	42%	–	11%
University of Texas at Tyler/Dallas News	Jan 21–30, 2020	905 (LV)	± 3.24%	47%	37%	15% (Note: "Neither-other" with 15%)	–
Data for Progress	Jan 16–21, 2020	1,486 (LV)	–	56%	36%	4% (Note: Would not vote with 4%)	4%
Texas Lyceum	Jan 10–19, 2020	520 (LV)	± 4.3%	51%	43%	–	6%
CNN/SSRS	Dec 4–9, 2019	1,003 (RV)	–	50%	43%	2%	6%
University of Texas at Tyler	Nov 5–14, 2019	1,093 (RV)	± 3.0%	45%	33%	-	22%
University of Texas at Tyler	Sep 13–15, 2019	1,199 (RV)	± 2.8%	39%	30%	21%	10%
Emerson	Aug 1–3, 2019	1,033 (RV)	± 3.0%	52%	48%	–	–
Quinnipiac University	May 29 – Jun 4, 2019	1,159 (RV)	± 3.4%	46%	44%	1%	6%
Emerson College	Apr 25–28, 2019	799 (RV)	± 3.4%	54%	46%	–	–

Donald Trump vs. Tom Steyer

Poll source	Date(s) administered	Sample size	Margin of error	Donald Trump (R)	Tom Steyer (D)	Other	Undecided
University of Texas at Tyler/Dallas News	Jan 21–30, 2020	909 (LV)	± 3.24%	47%	36%	17% (Note: "Neither-other" with 17%)	–

Donald Trump vs. Andrew Yang

Poll source	Date(s) administered	Sample size	Margin of error	Donald Trump (R)	Andrew Yang (D)	Other	Undecided
YouGov/University of Texas/Texas Tribune	Jan 31 – Feb 9, 2020	1,200 (RV)	± 2.83%	45%	43%	–	12%

Donald Trump vs. Cory Booker

Poll source	Date(s) administered	Sample size	Margin of error	Donald Trump (R)	Cory Booker (D)	Other	Undecided
Univision	Aug 31 – Sep 6, 2019	1,004 (RV)	–	41%	43%	–	16%

with Donald Trump and Julian Castro

Poll source	Date(s) administered	Sample size	Margin of error	Donald Trump (R)	Julian Castro (D)	Other	Undecided
University of Texas at Tyler	Nov 5–14, 2019	1,093 (RV)	± 3.0%	45%	34%	–	21%
University of Texas/Texas Tribune	Oct 18–27, 2019	1,200 (RV)	± 2.8%	46%	33%	14% (Note: "Someone else" with 14%)	7%
Univision	Aug 31 – Sep 6, 2019	1,004 (RV)	–	41%	44%	–	16%
Emerson	Aug 1–3, 2019	1,033 (RV)	± 3.0%	53%	47%	–	–
Quinnipiac University	May 29 – Jun 4, 2019	1,159 (RV)	± 3.4%	46%	43%	1%	6%
Quinnipiac University	Feb 20–25, 2019	1,222 (RV)	± 3.4%	46%	41%	2%	8%

with Donald Trump and Kamala Harris

Poll source	Date(s) administered	Sample size	Margin of error	Donald Trump (R)	Kamala Harris (D)	Other	Undecided
University of Texas at Tyler	Nov 5–14, 2019	1,093 (RV)	± 3.0%	46%	33%	-	21%
University of Texas at Tyler	Sep 13–15, 2019	1,199 (RV)	± 2.8%	39%	32%	19%	10%
Univision	Aug 31 – Sep 6, 2019	1,004 (RV)	–	44%	45%	–	11%
Emerson	Aug 1–3, 2019	1,033 (RV)	± 3.0%	54%	46%	–	–
Quinnipiac University	May 29 – Jun 4, 2019	1,159 (RV)	± 3.4%	47%	43%	1%	6%
Emerson College	Apr 25–28, 2019	799 (RV)	± 3.4%	54%	46%	–	–
Quinnipiac University	Feb 20–25, 2019	1,222 (RV)	± 3.4%	48%	41%	2%	5%
Public Policy Polling (D)	Feb 13–14, 2019	743 (RV)	± 3.6%	49%	40%	–	11%

with Donald Trump and Beto O'Rourke

Poll source	Date(s) administered	Sample size	Margin of error	Donald Trump (R)	Beto O'Rourke (D)	Other	Undecided
University of Texas/Texas Tribune	Oct 18–27, 2019	1,200 (RV)	± 2.8%	47%	41%	7% (Note: "Someone else" with 7%)	5%
University of Texas at Tyler	Sep 13–15, 2019	1,199 (RV)	± 2.8%	40%	42%	11%	8%
Emerson	Aug 1–3, 2019	1,033 (RV)	± 3.0%	52%	48%	–	–
Quinnipiac University	May 29 – Jun 4, 2019	1,159 (RV)	± 3.4%	48%	45%	1%	3%
Emerson College	Apr 25–28, 2019	799 (RV)	± 3.4%	50%	50%	–	–
Quinnipiac University	Feb 20–25, 2019	1,222 (RV)	± 3.4%	47%	46%	1%	4%
Atlantic Media & Research (R) (Note: Poll sponsored by Courageous Conservatives PAC)	Jan 5–11, 2019	504 (LV)	± 4.4%	52%	39%	–	–

Hypothetical polling

with Donald Trump and Mark Cuban

Poll source	Date(s) administered	Sample size	Margin of error	Donald Trump (R)	Mark Cuban (D)	Undecided
Public Policy Polling	Dec 2017	– (V)	–	44%	47%	–

with Donald Trump and a Generic Democrat

Poll source	Date(s) administered	Sample size	Margin of error	Donald Trump (R)	Generic Democrat (D)	Undecided
Univision	Aug 31 – Sep 6, 2019	1,004 (RV)	–	42%	47%	11%

with Donald Trump and a generic opponent

Poll source	Date(s) administered	Sample size	Margin of error	Donald Trump (R)	Generic Opponent	Undecided
University of Texas/Texas Tribune	Apr 10–19, 2020	1,200 (RV)	± 2.8%	49%	50% (Note: Listed as the combination of these responses: "Definitely or probably would not vote to re-elect Donald Trump")	7%
University of Texas/Texas Tribune	Jan 31 – Feb 9, 2020	1,200 (RV)	± 2.83%	48%	52%	–
University of Texas/Texas Tribune	Oct 18–27, 2019	1,200 (RV)	± 2.83%	48%	52%	–
Quinnipiac	Sep 4–9, 2019	1,410 (RV)	± 3.1%	35%	48% (Note: "Would definitely not vote for Trump" with 48%)	17% (Note: "Would consider voting for Trump" with 14%; "Don't know/no answer" with 3%)
University of Texas/Texas Tribune	May 31–Jun 9, 2019	1,200 (RV)	± 2.83%	50%	50%	–
University of Texas/Texas Tribune	Feb 15–24, 2019	1,200 (RV)	± 2.83%	49%	51%	–

=== Voting access ===
Matters of election administration and ease of voting during an ongoing pandemic were heavily litigated in Texas in 2020. Harris County, the most populous one in Texas, spearheaded a number of innovative approaches and was the focal point of several legal challenges.

For the 2020 elections, Harris County Commissioners approved a budget of $33 million, higher than the $4 million budget for the 2016 United States presidential election. Chris Hollins, the interim Harris County Clerk and Texas Democratic Party finance vice chairperson, created a 23-point voting access expansion program, which included promotion of voting by mail, expansion of early voting accessibility, and drive-through voting, an innovation to facilitate voting while at the same time mitigating infection risks during the COVID-19 pandemic. On October 29 several voting locations in Harris County were available for 24 hours to accommodate voters whose work shifts or other responsibilities overlapped with regular voting hours.

Local Republican activists and officials challenged the voter-friendly measures in multiple legal actions, with mixed success. Several lawsuits complained about early voting and about Harris County providing multiple drop-off locations for absentee ballots. Responding to pressure from within his own party, Governor Abbott then restricted the number of drop-offs to a single one per county regardless of population and size, forcing Harris County to close eleven sites at county clerk branch offices called annexes.

When a legal action challenging drive-through voting was dismissed, the Republican Party in Texas sought relief in the Texas Supreme Court (SCOTX), which denied the petition because the case had not been brought promptly. The first lawsuit was filed on October 15 even though Harris County had obtained prior clearance from the Office of the Texas Secretary of State (which is led by a Republican appointed by Republican Governor Abbott) and had tested drive-in voting in the primary runoff elections in July without complaint. SCOTX denied the petition and drive-thru voting continued. On October 29 another action was filed seeking to invalidate drive-thru ballots based on the contention that this was a form of curbside voting that the Texas Election Code authorized only for voters with disabilities. In an order issued on Sunday, November 1, the Texas Supreme Court denied the petition challenging the legality of drive-through voting, but did not resolve the legal argument one way or the other. The next day, U.S. District Judge Andrew Hanen heard an almost identical case by the same group of plaintiff, which included Republican candidates, on an emergency basis. Slate described the judge as "one of the most notoriously partisan conservatives in the federal judiciary." Hanen ruled against the plaintiffs, dismissing their action for lack of standing, with the result that drive-in voting remained in effect. The Plaintiffs, which included Steve Toth, immediately sought emergency relief in the Fifth Circuit Court of Appeals, but were unsuccessful. Hollins nevertheless cancelled drive-thru voting in tent structures on the eve of Election Day. He reversed himself out of concern that ballots cast there might be declared invalid, should the Fifth Circuit disagree with Judge Hanen on the standing issue and agree with Judge Hanen that tents were not permissible polling places on Election Day.

Some counties also set up an online system that allowed voters to check for wait times at early voting centers and make their voting plans accordingly.

On October 5, Texas governor Greg Abbott issued a proclamation under the Texas Disaster Act limiting each county to a single drop-off location for mail ballots. Federal judge Robert Pitman blocked Abbott's order on October 9. The next day, Texas Attorney General Ken Paxton appealed to the Fifth Circuit Court of Appeals for an emergency stay of Pitman's ruling, which a three-judge motion panel temporarily granted on an interim basis, pending consideration of the appeal on the merits. A Texas state judge also blocked Abbott's order on October 15, and a state appeals court upheld that decision on October 23. Paxton then sought emergency relief from the Texas Supreme Court, which backed the Governor and lifted the temporary injunction in an October 27 decision with no dissent.

=== Turnout ===
Voter registration in Texas ended on October 5, and the Secretary of State reported a registration total of 16,955,519 voters, an increase of 1,854,432 since the 2016 elections, and 1.2 million of which had occurred after the 2018 midterm elections.

Early voting began on October 13. Over one million ballots were received on that day, and by October 15 fewer than two million ballots were counted. The following day the count was 2.6 million, which meant 15.51% of the state's registered voters had already voted.

For the whole early voting period, votes in the age 18-29 range were higher than the total of that age group of 2016, with 1.3 million votes.

On October 13, Dallas County recorded 59,905 ballots and Tarrant County recorded 42,428 ballots, with the former setting a record for that county and the latter below the 2016 count on the first day of early voting.

On October 13, Harris County had an unofficial tally of 128,186 ballots received, the highest ever first day early voting count and over 5% of the county's registered voters. By the second day, the count was 287,931, 11% of the county's registered voters. On the third day, over 100,000 ballots were counted, and in those three days 387,000 ballots were counted, with 44,000 of them issued through the mail. On the fourth day, a similar number of ballots were cast, which meant the number of ballots cast total was about 500,000. On October 23, there were 1 million ballots cast from Harris County.

On October 13, Travis County received 35,873 ballots, while it received 38,119 the following day, and by 3 P.M. on Thursday over 26,000. When voting closed on Thursday the percentage of Travis County voters who had already voted was 16.44%. On Friday 41,328 additional votes were counted. Williamson County by the third day had a 64,891 votes out of 376,931 people registered to vote, which meant its turnout was already 17.25%.

On October 13, Bexar County recorded 78,000 votes, with over 45,000 by mail and the remainder in person.

On October 13, El Paso County recorded fewer than 34,000 votes.

By October 19, Texas voters cast 50% of the votes cast in the 2016 presidential election in Texas. By October 22, 65.5% of 2016 votes were cast (or 34.65% of registered voters). By October 25, over 80% of 2016 votes were cast (or 43% of registered voters), and by October 29, 50% of registered voters had cast ballots by early in-person and absentee ballot. By October 30, statewide voter turnout, as well as turnout in Harris County, had already surpassed the total of 2016.

=== Results ===
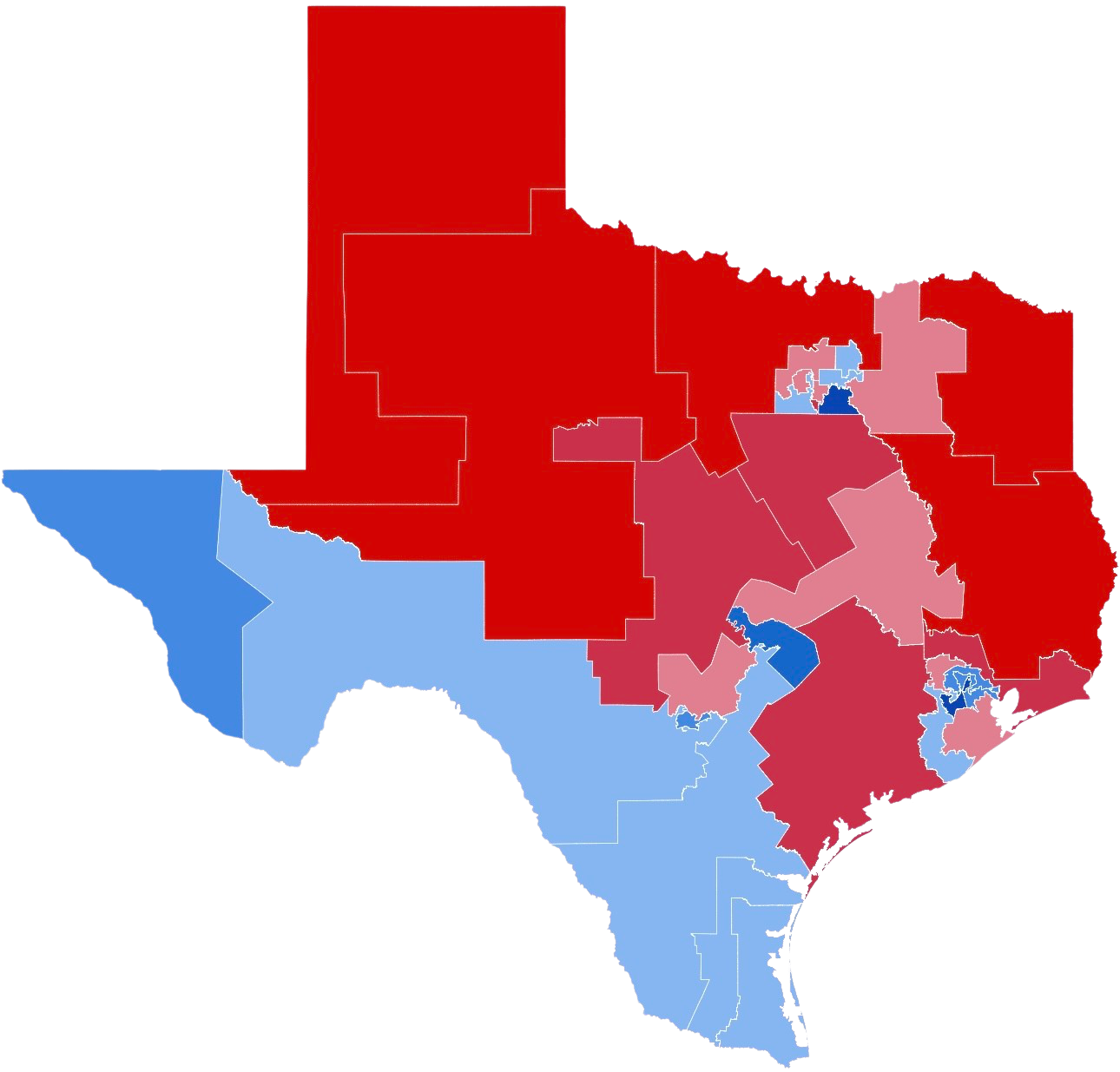
State Senate district results

2020 United States presidential election in Texas
Party	Candidate	Votes	%	±%
Republican	Donald Trump Mike Pence	5,890,347	52.06%	−0.17%
Democratic	Joe Biden Kamala Harris	5,259,126	46.48%	+3.24%
Libertarian	Jo Jorgensen Spike Cohen	126,243	1.12%	−2.04%
Green	Howie Hawkins Angela Walker	33,396	0.30%	−0.50%
Write-in		5,944	0.04%	–0.53%
Total votes		11,315,056	100.00%	N/A
Republican hold				

==== By county ====
County	Donald Trump Republican		Joe Biden Democratic		Various candidates Other parties		Margin		Total
County	#	%	#	%	#	%	#	%	Total
Anderson	15,110	78.59%	3,955	20.57%	162	0.84%	11,155	58.02%	19,227
Andrews	4,943	84.31%	850	14.50%	70	1.19%	4,093	69.81%	5,863
Angelina	25,076	72.40%	9,143	26.40%	416	1.20%	15,933	46.00%	34,635
Aransas	9,239	75.17%	2,916	23.73%	135	1.10%	6,323	51.44%	12,290
Archer	4,300	89.66%	446	9.30%	50	1.04%	3,854	80.36%	4,796
Armstrong	1,035	93.08%	75	6.74%	2	0.18%	960	86.34%	1,112
Atascosa	12,039	66.37%	5,876	32.40%	223	1.23%	6,163	33.97%	18,138
Austin	11,447	78.48%	2,951	20.23%	188	1.29%	8,496	58.25%	14,586
Bailey	1,434	77.10%	409	21.99%	17	0.91%	1,025	55.11%	1,860
Bandera	10,057	79.03%	2,505	19.68%	164	1.29%	7,552	59.35%	12,726
Bastrop	20,516	55.81%	15,474	42.09%	772	2.10%	5,042	13.72%	36,762
Baylor	1,494	87.78%	183	10.75%	25	1.47%	1,311	77.03%	1,702
Bee	6,006	63.72%	3,288	34.88%	132	1.40%	2,718	28.84%	9,426
Bell	67,893	53.17%	57,014	44.65%	2,783	2.18%	10,879	8.52%	127,690
Bexar	308,618	40.05%	448,452	58.20%	13,501	1.75%	-139,834	-18.15%	770,571
Blanco	5,443	72.97%	1,911	25.62%	105	1.41%	3,532	47.35%	7,459
Borden	397	95.43%	16	3.85%	3	0.72%	381	91.58%	416
Bosque	7,469	81.84%	1,561	17.10%	96	1.06%	5,908	64.74%	9,126
Bowie	27,116	70.87%	10,747	28.09%	398	1.04%	16,369	42.78%	38,261
Brazoria	90,433	58.35%	62,228	40.15%	2,323	1.50%	28,205	18.20%	154,984
Brazos	47,530	55.71%	35,349	41.43%	2,434	2.86%	12,181	14.28%	85,313
Brewster	2,461	51.04%	2,258	46.83%	103	2.13%	203	4.21%	4,822
Briscoe	639	88.14%	78	10.76%	8	1.10%	561	77.38%	725
Brooks	998	40.18%	1,470	59.18%	16	0.64%	-472	-19.00%	2,484
Brown	13,698	85.78%	2,107	13.19%	164	1.03%	11,591	72.59%	15,969
Burleson	6,743	78.33%	1,788	20.77%	78	0.90%	4,955	57.56%	8,609
Burnet	18,767	75.93%	5,639	22.81%	311	1.26%	13,128	53.12%	24,717
Caldwell	8,031	53.64%	6,672	44.56%	270	1.80%	1,359	9.08%	14,973
Calhoun	5,641	71.80%	2,148	27.34%	67	0.86%	3,493	44.46%	7,856
Callahan	6,012	87.92%	734	10.73%	92	1.35%	5,278	77.19%	6,838
Cameron	49,032	42.89%	64,063	56.04%	1,231	1.07%	-15,031	-13.15%	114,326
Camp	3,626	71.66%	1,394	27.55%	40	0.79%	2,232	44.11%	5,060
Carson	2,779	89.01%	297	9.51%	46	1.48%	2,482	79.50%	3,122
Cass	11,033	79.22%	2,795	20.07%	99	0.71%	8,238	59.15%	13,927
Castro	1,602	76.91%	466	22.37%	15	0.72%	1,136	54.54%	2,083
Chambers	17,353	80.15%	3,997	18.46%	302	1.39%	13,356	61.69%	21,652
Cherokee	15,101	77.41%	4,210	21.58%	197	1.01%	10,891	55.83%	19,508
Childress	1,943	85.26%	310	13.60%	26	1.14%	1,633	71.66%	2,279
Clay	5,069	88.25%	614	10.69%	61	1.06%	4,455	77.56%	5,744
Cochran	809	80.90%	177	17.70%	14	1.40%	632	63.20%	1,000
Coke	1,586	89.15%	178	10.01%	15	0.84%	1,408	79.14%	1,779
Coleman	3,641	88.18%	451	10.92%	37	0.90%	3,190	77.26%	4,129
Collin	252,318	51.26%	230,945	46.92%	8,953	1.82%	21,373	4.34%	492,216
Collingsworth	1,048	86.04%	155	12.73%	15	1.23%	893	73.31%	1,218
Colorado	7,472	74.91%	2,420	24.26%	83	0.83%	5,052	50.65%	9,975
Comal	62,740	70.58%	24,826	27.93%	1,326	1.49%	37,914	42.65%	88,892
Comanche	5,177	85.06%	853	14.02%	56	0.92%	4,324	71.04%	6,086
Concho	1,058	83.44%	197	15.54%	13	1.02%	861	67.90%	1,268
Cooke	15,596	81.98%	3,210	16.87%	219	1.15%	12,386	65.11%	19,025
Coryell	15,438	65.71%	7,565	32.20%	490	2.09%	7,873	33.51%	23,493
Cottle	540	81.57%	113	17.07%	9	1.36%	427	64.50%	662
Crane	1,247	82.97%	241	16.03%	15	1.00%	1,006	66.94%	1,503
Crockett	1,220	77.51%	344	21.86%	10	0.63%	876	55.65%	1,574
Crosby	1,396	71.48%	527	26.98%	30	1.54%	869	44.50%	1,953
Culberson	415	48.03%	438	50.69%	11	1.28%	-23	-2.66%	864
Dallam	1,389	86.33%	197	12.24%	23	1.43%	1,192	74.09%	1,609
Dallas	307,076	33.29%	598,576	64.89%	16,861	1.82%	-291,500	-31.60%	922,513
Dawson	2,951	77.88%	808	21.32%	30	0.80%	2,143	56.56%	3,789
Deaf Smith	3,294	71.45%	1,264	27.42%	52	1.13%	2,030	64.03%	4,610
Delta	2,162	83.41%	403	15.55%	27	1.04%	1,759	67.86%	2,592
Denton	222,480	53.23%	188,695	45.15%	6,789	1.62%	33,785	8.08%	417,964
DeWitt	6,567	80.89%	1,494	18.40%	57	0.71%	5,073	62.49%	8,118
Dickens	853	86.34%	130	13.16%	5	0.50%	723	73.18%	988
Dimmit	1,384	37.75%	2,264	61.76%	18	0.49%	-880	-24.01%	3,666
Donley	1,438	87.26%	198	12.01%	12	0.73%	1,240	75.25%	1,648
Duval	2,443	48.35%	2,575	50.96%	35	0.69%	-132	-2.61%	5,053
Eastland	7,237	87.27%	983	11.85%	73	0.88%	6,254	75.42%	8,293
Ector	32,697	73.33%	11,367	25.49%	527	1.18%	21,330	47.84%	44,591
Edwards	893	83.77%	168	15.76%	5	0.47%	725	68.01%	1,066
El Paso	84,331	31.56%	178,126	66.66%	4,758	1.78%	-93,795	-35.10%	267,215
Ellis	56,717	66.19%	27,565	32.17%	1,406	1.64%	29,152	34.02%	85,688
Erath	13,684	81.08%	2,916	17.28%	277	1.64%	10,768	63.80%	16,877
Falls	4,177	68.11%	1,899	30.96%	57	0.93%	2,278	37.15%	6,133
Fannin	12,171	81.10%	2,655	17.69%	181	1.21%	9,516	63.41%	15,007
Fayette	10,171	78.60%	2,661	20.56%	109	0.84%	7,510	58.04%	12,941
Fisher	1,448	79.30%	352	19.28%	26	1.42%	1,096	60.02%	1,826
Floyd	1,584	77.69%	438	21.48%	17	0.83%	1,146	56.21%	2,039
Foard	445	80.76%	99	17.97%	7	1.27%	346	62.79%	551
Fort Bend	157,718	44.01%	195,552	54.57%	5,063	1.42%	-37,834	-10.56%	358,333
Franklin	4,161	83.07%	804	16.05%	44	0.88%	3,357	67.02%	5,009
Freestone	6,991	80.25%	1,635	18.77%	85	0.98%	5,356	61.48%	8,711
Frio	2,823	53.48%	2,422	45.88%	34	0.64%	401	7.60%	5,279
Gaines	5,355	89.31%	576	9.61%	65	1.08%	4,779	79.70%	5,996
Galveston	93,911	60.56%	58,842	37.95%	2,307	1.49%	35,069	22.61%	155,060
Garza	1,413	85.48%	231	13.97%	9	0.55%	1,182	71.51%	1,653
Gillespie	12,514	78.95%	3,176	20.04%	160	1.01%	9,338	58.91%	15,850
Glasscock	611	93.57%	39	5.97%	3	0.46%	572	87.60%	653
Goliad	3,085	77.22%	877	21.95%	33	0.83%	2,208	55.27%	3,995
Gonzales	5,627	73.57%	1,948	25.47%	73	0.96%	3,679	48.10%	7,648
Gray	6,840	87.90%	829	10.65%	113	1.45%	6,011	77.25%	7,782
Grayson	44,163	74.26%	14,506	24.39%	805	1.35%	29,657	49.87%	59,474
Gregg	32,493	67.72%	14,796	30.84%	693	1.44%	17,697	36.88%	47,982
Grimes	9,432	75.98%	2,833	22.82%	149	1.20%	6,599	53.16%	12,414
Guadalupe	47,553	61.16%	28,805	37.04%	1,400	1.80%	18,748	24.12%	77,758
Hale	7,177	74.87%	2,279	23.77%	130	1.36%	4,898	51.10%	9,586
Hall	995	85.12%	168	14.37%	6	0.51%	827	70.75%	1,169
Hamilton	3,616	83.11%	641	14.73%	94	2.16%	2,975	68.38%	4,351
Hansford	1,849	90.33%	166	8.11%	32	1.56%	1,683	82.22%	2,047
Hardeman	1,330	84.18%	241	15.25%	9	0.57%	1,089	68.93%	1,580
Hardin	23,858	86.33%	3,474	12.57%	303	1.10%	20,384	73.76%	27,635
Harris	700,630	42.69%	918,193	55.94%	22,434	1.37%	-217,563	-13.25%	1,641,257
Harrison	21,466	72.23%	7,908	26.61%	343	1.16%	13,558	45.62%	29,717
Hartley	1,868	89.89%	195	9.38%	15	0.73%	1,673	80.51%	2,078
Haskell	1,840	83.11%	353	15.94%	21	0.95%	1,487	67.17%	2,214
Hays	47,680	43.59%	59,524	54.41%	2,191	2.00%	-11,844	-10.82%	109,395
Hemphill	1,486	86.40%	206	11.98%	28	1.62%	1,280	74.42%	1,720
Henderson	28,911	79.61%	7,060	19.44%	346	0.95%	21,851	60.17%	36,317
Hidalgo	90,527	40.98%	128,199	58.04%	2,158	0.98%	-37,672	-17.06%	220,884
Hill	11,926	79.87%	2,860	19.15%	145	0.98%	9,066	60.82%	14,931
Hockley	6,536	80.69%	1,482	18.30%	82	1.01%	5,054	62.39%	8,100
Hood	26,496	81.42%	5,648	17.36%	397	1.22%	20,848	64.06%	32,541
Hopkins	12,719	79.79%	3,046	19.11%	176	1.10%	9,673	60.68%	15,941
Houston	7,060	74.80%	2,314	24.52%	64	0.68%	4,746	50.28%	9,438
Howard	8,054	78.64%	2,069	20.20%	118	1.16%	5,985	58.44%	10,241
Hudspeth	779	66.87%	371	31.85%	15	1.28%	408	35.02%	1,165
Hunt	29,163	75.56%	8,906	23.07%	528	1.37%	20,257	52.49%	38,597
Hutchinson	7,681	87.55%	965	11.00%	127	1.45%	6,716	76.55%	8,773
Irion	759	85.38%	120	13.50%	10	1.12%	639	71.88%	889
Jack	3,418	90.38%	331	8.75%	33	0.87%	3,087	81.63%	3,782
Jackson	5,231	82.34%	1,033	16.26%	89	1.40%	4,198	66.08%	6,353
Jasper	12,542	80.34%	2,954	18.92%	115	0.74%	9,588	61.42%	15,611
Jeff Davis	784	60.08%	501	38.39%	20	1.53%	283	21.69%	1,305
Jefferson	47,570	50.20%	46,073	48.62%	1,116	1.18%	1,497	1.58%	94,759
Jim Hogg	833	40.91%	1,197	58.79%	6	0.30%	-364	-17.88%	2,036
Jim Wells	7,453	54.52%	6,119	44.77%	97	0.71%	1,334	9.75%	13,669
Johnson	54,628	75.85%	16,464	22.86%	928	1.29%	38,164	52.99%	72,020
Jones	5,660	83.96%	999	14.82%	82	1.22%	4,661	69.14%	6,741
Karnes	3,968	75.55%	1,234	23.50%	50	0.95%	2,734	52.05%	5,252
Kaufman	37,624	66.34%	18,405	32.45%	689	1.21%	19,219	33.89%	56,718
Kendall	20,083	75.92%	6,020	22.76%	349	1.32%	14,063	53.16%	26,452
Kenedy	127	65.46%	65	33.51%	2	1.03%	62	31.95%	194
Kent	411	88.96%	47	10.17%	4	0.87%	364	78.79%	462
Kerr	20,879	75.25%	6,524	23.51%	342	1.24%	14,355	51.74%	27,745
Kimble	1,987	86.69%	284	12.39%	21	0.92%	1,703	74.30%	2,292
King	151	94.97%	8	5.03%	0	0.00%	143	89.94%	159
Kinney	1,144	71.37%	446	27.82%	13	0.81%	698	43.55%	1,603
Kleberg	5,504	50.29%	5,314	48.56%	126	1.15%	190	1.73%	10,944
Knox	1,180	81.04%	265	18.20%	11	0.76%	915	62.84%	1,456
Lamar	16,760	78.16%	4,458	20.79%	224	1.05%	12,302	57.37%	21,442
Lamb	3,521	79.84%	840	19.05%	49	1.11%	2,681	60.79%	4,410
Lampasas	8,086	77.76%	2,144	20.62%	169	1.62%	5,942	57.14%	10,399
La Salle	1,335	55.49%	1,052	43.72%	19	0.79%	283	11.77%	2,406
Lavaca	8,804	86.34%	1,333	13.07%	60	0.59%	7,471	73.27%	10,197
Lee	6,255	77.22%	1,750	21.60%	95	1.18%	4,505	55.62%	8,100
Leon	7,523	86.62%	1,072	12.34%	90	1.04%	6,451	74.28%	8,685
Liberty	23,302	79.44%	5,785	19.72%	247	0.84%	17,517	59.72%	29,334
Limestone	6,789	74.65%	2,213	24.33%	93	1.02%	4,576	50.32%	9,095
Lipscomb	1,205	89.06%	131	9.68%	17	1.26%	1,074	79.38%	1,353
Live Oak	4,199	83.08%	819	16.20%	36	0.72%	3,380	66.88%	5,054
Llano	10,079	79.61%	2,465	19.47%	116	0.92%	7,614	60.14%	12,660
Loving	60	90.91%	4	6.06%	2	3.03%	56	84.85%	66
Lubbock	78,861	65.27%	40,017	33.12%	1,939	1.61%	38,844	32.15%	120,817
Lynn	1,853	80.81%	428	18.67%	12	0.52%	1,425	64.14%	2,293
Madison	4,169	78.69%	1,088	20.54%	41	0.77%	3,081	58.15%	5,298
Marion	3,470	71.34%	1,339	27.53%	55	1.13%	2,131	43.81%	4,864
Martin	1,857	85.97%	288	13.33%	15	0.70%	1,569	72.64%	2,160
Mason	1,991	80.48%	457	18.47%	26	1.05%	1,534	62.01%	2,474
Matagorda	9,845	71.72%	3,733	27.19%	149	1.09%	6,112	44.53%	13,727
Maverick	6,881	44.84%	8,332	54.29%	133	0.87%	-1,451	-9.45%	15,346
McCulloch	2,904	84.52%	490	14.26%	42	1.22%	2,414	70.26%	3,436
McLennan	59,543	60.84%	36,688	37.49%	1,641	1.67%	22,855	23.35%	97,872
McMullen	460	89.15%	53	10.27%	3	0.58%	407	78.88%	516
Medina	15,642	69.04%	6,773	29.89%	242	1.07%	8,869	39.15%	22,657
Menard	823	80.06%	197	19.16%	8	0.78%	626	60.90%	1,028
Midland	45,624	77.34%	12,329	20.90%	1,035	1.76%	33,295	56.44%	58,988
Milam	7,984	75.48%	2,496	23.60%	98	0.92%	5,488	51.88%	10,578
Mills	2,217	88.50%	271	10.82%	17	0.68%	1,946	77.68%	2,505
Mitchell	2,170	84.14%	397	15.39%	12	0.47%	1,773	68.75%	2,579
Montague	8,615	87.74%	1,097	11.17%	107	1.09%	7,518	76.57%	9,819
Montgomery	193,382	71.22%	74,377	27.39%	3,784	1.39%	119,005	43.83%	271,543
Moore	4,359	79.14%	1,062	19.28%	87	1.58%	3,297	59.86%	5,508
Morris	3,872	69.30%	1,669	29.87%	46	0.83%	2,203	39.43%	5,587
Motley	604	92.64%	46	7.06%	2	0.30%	558	85.58%	652
Nacogdoches	17,378	64.88%	9,000	33.60%	407	1.52%	8,378	31.28%	26,785
Navarro	13,800	72.16%	5,101	26.67%	222	1.17%	8,699	45.49%	19,123
Newton	4,882	80.11%	1,173	19.25%	39	0.64%	3,709	60.86%	6,094
Nolan	4,131	77.11%	1,162	21.69%	64	1.20%	2,969	55.42%	5,357
Nueces	64,617	50.75%	60,925	47.85%	1,780	1.40%	3,692	2.90%	127,322
Ochiltree	2,812	89.10%	302	9.57%	42	1.33%	2,510	79.53%	3,156
Oldham	917	90.88%	81	8.03%	11	1.09%	836	82.85%	1,009
Orange	29,186	81.09%	6,357	17.66%	451	1.25%	22,829	63.43%	35,994
Palo Pinto	10,179	81.50%	2,178	17.44%	132	1.06%	8,001	64.06%	12,489
Panola	9,326	81.44%	2,057	17.96%	68	0.60%	7,269	63.48%	11,451
Parker	62,045	81.50%	13,017	17.10%	1,066	1.40%	49,028	64.40%	76,128
Parmer	2,135	80.57%	488	18.42%	27	1.01%	1,627	62.15%	2,650
Pecos	3,215	68.87%	1,382	29.61%	71	1.52%	1,833	39.26%	4,668
Polk	18,573	76.79%	5,387	22.27%	226	0.94%	13,186	54.52%	24,186
Potter	22,820	68.45%	9,921	29.76%	596	1.79%	12,899	38.69%	33,337
Presidio	721	32.52%	1,463	65.99%	33	1.49%	-742	-33.47%	2,217
Rains	5,155	85.16%	842	13.91%	56	0.93%	4,313	71.25%	6,053
Randall	50,796	78.54%	12,802	19.79%	1,076	1.67%	37,994	58.75%	64,674
Reagan	942	83.81%	172	15.30%	10	0.89%	770	68.51%	1,124
Real	1,643	82.90%	320	16.15%	19	0.95%	1,323	66.75%	1,982
Red River	4,517	77.80%	1,246	21.46%	43	0.74%	3,271	56.34%	5,806
Reeves	2,254	61.10%	1,395	37.82%	40	1.08%	859	23.28%	3,689
Refugio	2,210	65.66%	1,108	32.92%	48	1.42%	1,102	32.74%	3,366
Roberts	529	96.18%	17	3.09%	4	0.73%	512	93.09%	550
Robertson	5,646	69.71%	2,374	29.31%	79	0.98%	3,272	40.40%	8,099
Rockwall	36,726	68.15%	16,412	30.45%	753	1.40%	20,314	37.70%	53,891
Runnels	3,807	86.35%	552	12.52%	50	1.13%	3,255	73.83%	4,409
Rusk	16,534	77.34%	4,629	21.65%	214	1.01%	11,905	55.69%	21,377
Sabine	4,784	87.12%	669	12.18%	38	0.70%	4,115	74.94%	5,491
San Augustine	3,007	75.14%	980	24.49%	15	0.37%	2,027	50.65%	4,002
San Jacinto	10,161	80.39%	2,337	18.49%	142	1.12%	7,824	61.90%	12,640
San Patricio	16,516	63.79%	8,988	34.71%	387	1.50%	7,528	29.08%	25,891
San Saba	2,308	88.70%	287	11.03%	7	0.27%	2,021	77.67%	2,602
Schleicher	940	81.10%	211	18.21%	8	0.69%	729	62.89%	1,159
Scurry	4,983	84.89%	818	13.94%	69	1.17%	4,165	70.95%	5,870
Shackelford	1,484	91.15%	130	7.99%	14	0.86%	1,354	83.16%	1,628
Shelby	7,975	79.06%	2,068	20.50%	44	0.44%	5,907	58.56%	10,087
Sherman	886	89.31%	91	9.17%	15	1.52%	795	80.14%	992
Smith	69,080	68.85%	29,615	29.52%	1,639	1.63%	39,465	39.33%	100,334
Somervell	4,105	82.98%	768	15.52%	74	1.50%	3,337	67.46%	4,947
Starr	8,247	47.06%	9,123	52.06%	155	0.88%	-876	-5.00%	17,525
Stephens	3,385	88.96%	397	10.43%	23	0.61%	2,988	78.53%	3,805
Sterling	584	91.39%	51	7.98%	4	0.63%	533	83.41%	639
Stonewall	615	83.56%	116	15.76%	5	0.68%	499	67.80%	736
Sutton	1,222	78.48%	322	20.68%	13	0.84%	900	57.80%	1,557
Swisher	1,845	78.34%	478	20.30%	32	1.36%	1,367	58.04%	2,355
Tarrant	409,741	49.09%	411,567	49.31%	13,389	1.60%	-1,826	-0.22%	834,697
Taylor	39,547	71.73%	14,588	26.46%	1,000	1.81%	24,959	45.27%	55,135
Terrell	334	72.93%	119	25.98%	5	1.09%	215	46.95%	458
Terry	2,812	77.85%	757	20.96%	43	1.19%	2,055	56.89%	3,612
Throckmorton	806	90.16%	82	9.17%	6	0.67%	724	80.99%	894
Titus	7,570	71.81%	2,856	27.09%	115	1.10%	4,714	44.72%	10,541
Tom Green	32,313	71.47%	12,239	27.07%	658	1.46%	20,074	44.40%	45,210
Travis	161,337	26.43%	435,860	71.41%	13,152	2.16%	-274,523	-44.98%	610,349
Trinity	5,579	80.41%	1,323	19.07%	36	0.52%	4,256	61.34%	6,938
Tyler	8,194	84.82%	1,403	14.52%	63	0.66%	6,791	70.30%	9,660
Upshur	15,809	83.56%	2,877	15.21%	233	1.23%	12,932	68.35%	18,919
Upton	1,178	86.11%	170	12.43%	20	1.46%	1,008	73.68%	1,368
Uvalde	6,174	59.69%	4,073	39.38%	97	0.93%	2,101	20.31%	10,344
Val Verde	8,284	54.21%	6,771	44.31%	225	1.48%	1,513	9.90%	15,280
Van Zandt	22,270	85.56%	3,516	13.51%	243	0.93%	18,754	72.05%	26,029
Victoria	23,358	68.25%	10,380	30.33%	488	1.42%	12,978	37.92%	34,226
Walker	15,375	65.12%	7,884	33.39%	353	1.49%	7,491	31.73%	23,612
Waller	14,260	62.73%	8,191	36.03%	283	1.24%	6,069	26.70%	22,734
Ward	3,241	79.83%	764	18.82%	55	1.35%	2,477	61.01%	4,060
Washington	12,959	74.27%	4,261	24.42%	229	1.31%	8,698	49.85%	17,449
Webb	25,898	37.80%	41,820	61.05%	788	1.15%	-15,922	-23.25%	68,506
Wharton	11,926	71.15%	4,694	28.01%	141	0.84%	7,232	43.14%	16,761
Wheeler	2,159	92.38%	168	7.19%	10	0.43%	1,991	85.19%	2,337
Wichita	32,069	69.65%	13,161	28.59%	810	1.76%	18,908	41.06%	46,040
Wilbarger	3,524	77.90%	956	21.13%	44	0.97%	2,568	56.77%	4,524
Willacy	2,441	43.99%	3,108	56.01%	0	0.00%	-667	-12.02%	5,549
Williamson	139,729	48.15%	143,795	49.56%	6,644	2.29%	-4,066	-1.41%	290,168
Wilson	18,463	73.76%	6,350	25.37%	219	0.87%	12,113	48.39%	25,032
Winkler	1,753	82.46%	358	16.84%	15	0.70%	1,395	65.62%	2,126
Wise	27,032	83.52%	4,973	15.37%	360	1.11%	22,059	67.15%	32,365
Wood	19,049	83.63%	3,509	15.40%	221	0.97%	15,540	68.23%	22,779
Yoakum	2,174	82.63%	420	15.96%	37	1.41%	1,754	66.67%	2,631
Young	7,110	86.30%	1,034	12.55%	95	1.15%	6,076	73.75%	8,239
Zapata	2,033	52.48%	1,826	47.13%	15	0.39%	207	5.35%	3,874
Zavala	1,490	34.03%	2,864	65.40%	25	0.57%	-1,374	-31.37%	4,379
Totals (Note: Results slightly differ from the broad report vs the broken down certified report that added more votes for third party/write-in candidates.)	5,890,347	52.01%	5,259,126	46.44%	175,813	1.55%	631,221	5.57%	11,325,286

Counties that flipped from Democratic to Republican

- Frio (largest municipality: Pearsall)
- Jim Wells (largest municipality: Alice)
- Kenedy (largest municipality: Sarita)
- Kleberg (largest municipality: Kingsville)
- La Salle (largest municipality: Cotulla)
- Reeves (largest municipality: Pecos)
- Val Verde (largest municipality: Del Rio)
- Zapata (largest municipality: Zapata)

Counties that flipped from Republican to Democratic

- Hays (largest municipality: San Marcos)
- Tarrant (largest municipality: Fort Worth)
- Williamson (largest municipality: Round Rock)

==== By congressional district ====
Trump won 22 out of the 36 congressional districts in Texas, while Biden won 14, including one held by a Republican.

District	Trump	Biden	Representative
1st	72%	27%	Louie Gohmert
2nd	50%	49%	Dan Crenshaw
3rd	50%	49%	Van Taylor
4th	74%	24%	Vacant
4th	74%	24%	Pat Fallon
5th	61%	38%	Lance Gooden
6th	51%	48%	Ron Wright
7th	45%	54%	Lizzie Fletcher
8th	71%	28%	Kevin Brady
9th	23%	76%	Al Green
10th	50%	48%	Michael McCaul
11th	79%	20%	Mike Conaway
11th	79%	20%	August Pfluger
12th	60%	38%	Kay Granger
13th	79%	19%	Mac Thornberry
13th	79%	19%	Ronny Jackson
14th	59%	40%	Randy Weber
15th	49%	50%	Vicente Gonzalez
16th	32%	66%	Veronica Escobar
17th	55%	44%	Bill Flores
17th	55%	44%	Pete Sessions
18th	23%	76%	Sheila Jackson Lee
19th	72%	26%	Jodey Arrington
20th	35%	64%	Joaquín Castro
21st	51%	48%	Chip Roy
22nd	50%	49%	Pete Olson
22nd	50%	49%	Troy Nehls
23rd	50%	49%	Will Hurd
23rd	50%	49%	Tony Gonzales
24th	47%	52%	Kenny Marchant
24th	47%	52%	Beth Van Duyne
25th	54%	44%	Roger Williams
26th	56%	42%	Michael Burgess
27th	61%	37%	Michael Cloud
28th	47%	52%	Henry Cuellar
29th	33%	66%	Sylvia Garcia
30th	19%	80%	Eddie Bernice Johnson
31st	50%	47%	John Carter
32nd	44%	54%	Colin Allred
33rd	26%	73%	Marc Veasey
34th	48%	52%	Filemon Vela Jr.
35th	31%	68%	Lloyd Doggett
36th	72%	27%	Brian Babin

== Analysis ==
While Biden still won Latino voters in Texas with 58% and Latinos of Mexican heritage with 63%, Trump significantly improved his numbers among Hispanic voters in the state, particularly in the Rio Grande Valley. Trump flipped Jim Wells County and La Salle County which had not voted Republican since 1972. He also flipped Frio County, Kleberg County, Reeves County, Val Verde County, and Kenedy County; the first 4 having last voted Republican in 2004 and the last having last voted Republican in 2012. He also became the first Republican to win Zapata County since Warren G. Harding in 1920, flipping it by five points after losing it by 33 points in 2016. Trump's total of eight counties flipped in South Texas was the most flipped by any candidate in any state in 2020, and he flipped more counties in South Texas than he did in the rest of the nation combined. While Biden's lead in the Rio Grande Valley shrunk significantly compared to Hillary Clinton's in 2016, he overwhelmingly won the Latino vote in the state's urban areas.

Biden significantly outperformed Clinton in Greater Austin, which contributed to Trump's relatively weak performance statewide. He flipped Hays County and Williamson County, both of them suburban counties located outside of the state capital that a Democrat had not won since 1992 and 1976, respectively. This is also the first election since 1956 when the latter voted for the statewide loser. Biden also became the first Democratic candidate to garner at least 50,000 votes in Bell County, a county just outside of Greater Austin and had the center of Texas population within it in the 2010 census. At 44.76%, he outperformed Obama's record for the highest percentage of votes a Democratic presidential nominee received in Bell County since 1976, the last time the county voted for a Democrat.

Also, Biden became the first Democrat to ever win the White House without Jefferson County. Biden also became the first Democrat to win without Frio County since it was formed in 1871, the first to win without La Salle County since it was formed in 1880, the first to win without Reeves County since it was formed in 1883, the first to win without Val Verde County since it was formed in 1885, the first to win without Jim Wells County since it was founded in 1911, the first to win without Kleberg County since it was founded in 1913, and the first Democrat to win the White House without winning Zapata County since Woodrow Wilson in 1916. Because of Trump's substantial gains in heavily Hispanic areas, Biden's best performance in Texas came not from the southern border region, but Travis County, encompassing the college-educated, cosmopolitan, liberal bastion of Austin, home to the University of Texas at Austin, where he won the highest percentage for a Democrat since Harry S. Truman in 1948.

Biden also improved throughout the three most significant metropolitan areas in Texas. While not significantly outperforming Clinton in Harris and Bexar counties, he did make considerable inroads into their surrounding suburbs, thus eking out narrow wins in Greater Houston and Greater San Antonio, the first time a Democratic presidential nominee had accomplished such a feat in the 21st century. However, in the former, gains were incredibly mixed. Trump saw substantial growth in Houston's north and east, home to large concentrations of Latinos. He also improved in diverse Alief, along Harris County's southwest border, which is heavily Hispanic, Filipino, and Vietnamese. On the other hand, Biden continued Clinton's gains in the wealthy college-educated "Houston Arrow" suburbs in the city's west, though his improvements were significantly more minor.

Perhaps the biggest reason for Biden narrowing the Lone Star State's margin of victory was the surge of Democratic support in the Dallas–Fort Worth metroplex, the largest metropolitan area in the state, which he also narrowly won. He scored nearly 65% of the vote in Dallas County, the highest percentage won by a Democrat since 1940. Additionally, Biden narrowly flipped Tarrant County, winning by fewer than 2,000 votes. Tarrant County is home to the fifth-largest city in Texas, Fort Worth, and had not been won by a Democrat since 1964, when favorite son Lyndon B. Johnson carried it. His growth in the heavily Republican Fort Worth suburbs, which historically kept Democratic candidates from capturing Tarrant, was a critical factor in winning the county and the Metroplex as a whole. Biden improved substantially in the large DFW suburbs of Collin County and Denton County, which have rapidly grown and diversified in the past decade, narrowing Trump's victory margins from 16.57% and 20% in 2016, down to 4.37% and 8.08%, respectively. Both of their county seats (the two suburban cities of McKinney and Denton, respectively) have trended leftward since 2016 due to the influx of younger professionals and families in the past decade, which shifted to the Democrats in this election. Biden also won the city of Plano, the largest city in Collin County, and narrowly won the city of Allen.

In 2021, Texas Attorney General Ken Paxton stated on Steve Bannon's podcast War Room that without blocking Harris County from sending out applications for mail-in ballots to registered voters, Trump would have lost the state.

=== Edison exit polls ===
2020 presidential election in Texas by demographic subgroup (Edison exit polling)
Demographic subgroup	Biden	Trump	% of total vote
Total vote	46.48	52.06	100
Ideology
Liberals	88	11	17
Moderates	66	32	38
Conservatives	13	86	45
Party
Democrats	96	4	30
Republicans	5	94	41
Independents	51	45	29
Gender
Men	40	57	45
Women	51	48	55
Race/ethnicity
White	33	66	60
Black	90	9	12
Latino	58	41	23
Asian	63	30	3
Other	42	56	2
Age
18–24 years old	58	38	8
25–29 years old	55	42	6
30–39 years old	50	47	14
40–49 years old	47	51	15
50–64 years old	43	56	30
65 and older	41	58	26
Sexual orientation
LGBT	72	27	5
Not LGBT	43	56	95
Education
High school or less	40	59	17
Some college education	42	57	28
Associate degree	51	47	16
Bachelor's degree	48	50	24
Postgraduate degree	54	44	15
Income
Under $30,000	52	47	12
$30,000–49,999	63	35	16
$50,000–99,999	44	55	35
$100,000–199,999	43	56	26
Over $200,000	54	42	10
Issue regarded as most important
Racial inequality	93	5	18
Coronavirus	88	10	14
Economy	15	84	40
Crime and safety	16	83	10
Health care	78	21	11
Region
East	26	72	14
Dallas/Ft. Worth	54	45	24
Houston area	53	46	21
South Central	51	48	15
West	22	76	11
Southwest	57	42	16
Area type
Urban	56	42	42
Suburban	41	57	51
Rural	25	74	7
Family's financial situation today
Better than four years ago	22	76	46
Worse than four years ago	89	11	18
About the same	70	29	35

== See also ==
- United States presidential elections in Texas
- Voter suppression in the United States 2019–2020: Texas
- 2020 Texas elections
- 2020 United States presidential election
- 2020 Democratic Party presidential primaries
- 2020 Republican Party presidential primaries
- 2020 United States elections

== Notes ==
Partisan clients

Samples
