= American Journalism Project =

American non-profit organization

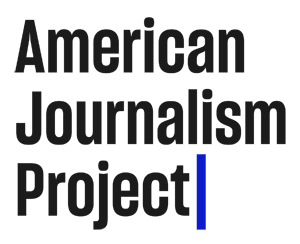
- Formation: 2019; 7 years ago
- Tax ID no.: 13-1656647
- Purpose: Local news
- Headquarters: Washington, D.C.
- Founders: John Thornton, Elizabeth Green
- Website: theajp.org

The American Journalism Project (AJP) is a not-for-profit organization dedicated to improving resources for local journalism. Its main function is to provide grants to 501(c)(3) organizations, specifically to news organizations that are underfunded, focusing on coverage of local issues such as politics and schools.

AJP was founded in 2019 by two journalists, Elizabeth Green of Chalkbeat and John Thornton of The Texas Tribune.

AJP is the recipient of grants to further their cause. Grantors include the Knight Foundation, and the MacArthur Foundation, AJP has partnered with OpenAI to explore how artificial intelligence can be used to strengthen local news coverage.

ProPublica's Nonprofit Explorer presents financial information from Form 990 tax filings by year for AJP

	Expenses	Net Income	Net Assets
2023	$20,350,451	$4,077,829	$56,860,671
2022	$20,645,281	$21,766,579	$52,577,354
2021	$12,811,430	$12,292,064	$30,728,893
2020	$8,044,834	$3,311,423	$18,477,806
2019	$2,883,492	$15,166,383	$15,166,383
