= Armstrong (content management system) =

Armstrong is an open source news publishing platform jointly developed by nonprofit online news organizations The Texas Tribune and The Bay Citizen with the assistance of a grant by the Knight Foundation. The core of the content management system's functionality was used by The Texas Tribune and The Bay Citizen since 2009, and it was released to the public in 2011. The Nieman Journalism Lab has described the project as "A Wordpress for news orgs." The grant for Armstrong's development expired in 2012, and by 2017 the software's homepage had not been updated since 2014. As of 2022 the website was parked and the most recent commits to its GitHub repository had been made in 2013.

Armstrong was designed primarily to simplify the publishing process for other nonprofit news organizations by giving them the option of a CMS specifically created for news. Focuses of the system include media management, search engine optimization, integration with social media, and development of revenue streams. Higinio Maycotte, CTO of The Texas Tribune, said that "literally hundreds of media companies around the globe have expressed interest in moving to Armstrong."

The project to release Armstrong as an open source CMS was fueled by a $975,000 grant from the Knight Foundation, which is devoted to media innovation, to The Texas Tribune and The Bay Citizen. The grant was announced at SXSW Interactive in March 2011.

Armstrong is written in Django, an open source framework for web applications in the Python programming language.
