= John Thornton (venture capitalist) =

American venture capitalist (1965–2025)

John Douglas Thornton
- Born: April 9, 1965; Wichita, Kansas
- Died: March 29, 2025 (aged 59); Austin, Texas
- Education: Trinity University, Stanford University

John Thornton (1965 – 2025) was an American venture capitalist. He was the co-founder of Elsewhere Partners and the American Journalism Project and the founder of The Texas Tribune.

Thornton was born on April 9, 1965 in Wichita, Kansas. In 1987 He received his bachelor’s degree from Trinity University in San Antonio, Texas and in 1991 he received his Master of Business Administration from Stanford University.

Thornton worked at McKinsey & Company and Austin Ventures. In the early 2000s as many local news organizations were losing money due to lack of advertising revenue, Thornton became interested in ways to sustain local news.

In 2008 Thornton founded The Texas Tribune, a non-profit news website that focuses on local news. In 2019 he cofounded the American Journalism Project which funds local digital nonprofit news outlets.

He died on March 29, 2025 in Austin, Texas.
