= The Bay Citizen =

- Type: Online newspaper
- Owner: Center for Investigative Reporting
- Founded: 2010
- Ceased publication: 2013
- Headquarters: 126 Post St., Suite 105; San Francisco, California
- Price: Free Online

The Bay Citizen was a non-profit news organization covering the San Francisco Bay Area. It was founded as the Bay Area News Project in January 2010 with money provided by Warren Hellman's Hellman Family Foundation. On May 26, 2010 the organization launched the website, baycitizen.org. In June 2010 The Bay Citizen began producing content for the newly added biweekly two-page Bay Area Report published in The New York Times.

The Bay Citizen was part of a small but growing number of similar news organizations across the country dedicated to locally focused public service journalism, including Voice of San Diego, Texas Tribune, and MinnPost.

== History ==
In early 2009 billionaire investor and Bay Area philanthropist Warren Hellman convened an advisory committee to explore a solution to the lack of strong local journalism. In January 2010, The Bay Area News Project was founded.

Lisa Frazier, formerly the head of McKinsey & Company’s West Coast Media and Entertainment practice, was appointed President and CEO. Jonathan Weber, formerly of The Industry Standard was recruited to lead the newsroom.

In addition to Weber, editorial staff includes Managing Editor for News Steve Fainaru, previously an investigative journalist with the Washington Post; Jeanne Carstensen, formerly of Salon.com, and SFGate.com, and 11 full-time journalists. Weber claims he received over 500 resumes for the editorial positions.

On March 23, 2010 the organization changed their name to "The Bay Citizen" and added the slogan "News/Culture/Community." CEO Lisa Frazier said in a news release that the name was chosen because "Our mission is to provide news and information that helps create more 'Bay Citizens.'"

According to the SF Business Times, The Bay Citizen raised $3.7 million from foundations and families. Don Fisher, Gap founder, and Value Act CEO Jeff Ubben donated $1 million each, but the site also raised money from less wealthy and prominent donors. The site received a $250,000 grant from the John S. and James L. Knight Foundation, which gives money to journalism projects. This came on top of the Hellman Family Foundation's $5 million in seed money.

The Bay Citizen alongside The Texas Tribune also recently received a joint $975,000 grant from the Knight Foundation to develop an open source publishing platform tailored for nonprofit news organizations. The system, named Armstrong, is based on technology The Bay Citizen has previously been employing.

Warren Hellman died on December 18, 2011, of complications from treatments for leukemia. Jeffrey Ubben, co-chairman of the board of directors, assumed the chairmanship.

In May 2012, The Bay Citizen merged with the Center for Investigative Reporting. In May 2013, The Bay Citizen newsroom merged into the CIR.

== Relationship with The New York Times ==
Starting in 2010, the Bay Citizen produced the Bay Area Report, a two-page section of The New York Times distributed to 65,000 households in the Bay Area. According to The Times, the Bay Citizen "has pledged that its newsroom will be strictly independent, nonpartisan and apolitical. Donors and board members can have no influence over news decisions..."

The relationship with The New York Times ended at the end of April 2012 as a result of the Bay Citizen's merger with the Center for Investigative Reporting.

== Board of directors ==
- Warren Hellman, Chairman of the Board and founder of Hellman & Friedman
- Neil Henry, Dean of the University of California, Berkeley Graduate School of Journalism
- Jeffrey Ubben, Founder of ValueAct Capital and Chair of the Posse Foundation
- Andrew Woeber, Partner/Managing Director at Greenhill & Co.
- Susan Hirsch, President of Hirsch & Associates, LLC
- Lisa Frazier, President and CEO of The Bay Citizen
