= Elise Hu =

American broadcast journalist

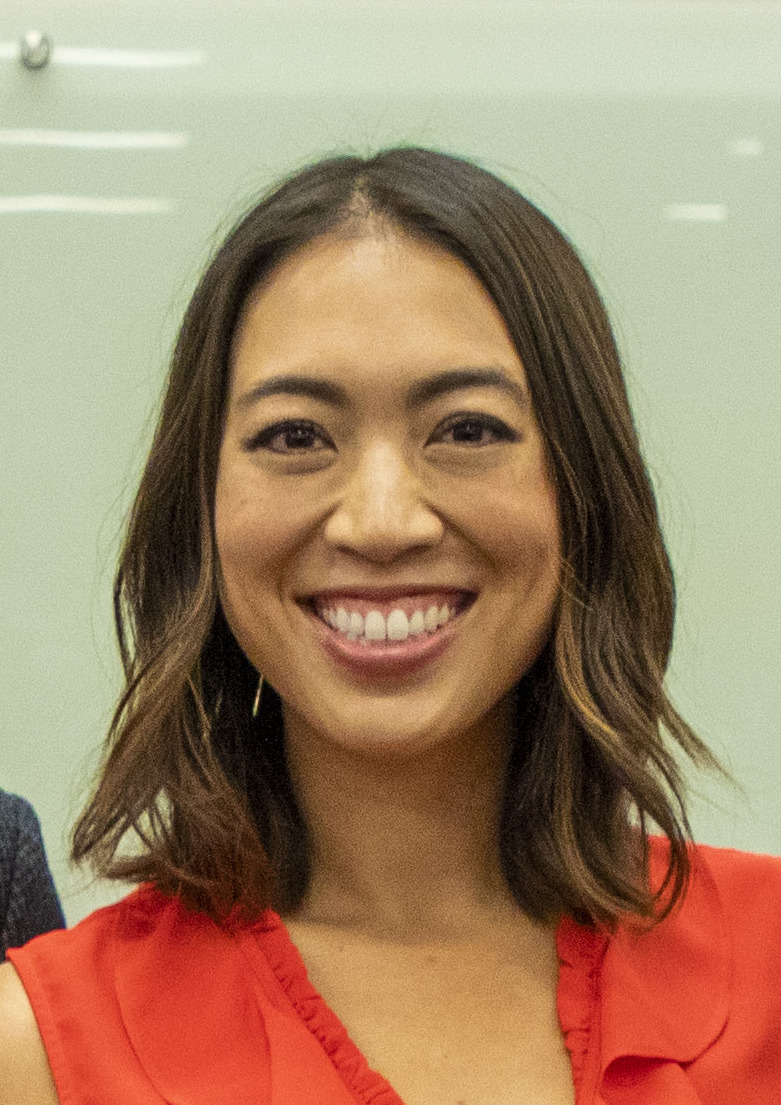
- Born: February 17, 1982 (age 44); St. Louis, Missouri, U.S.
- Education: University of Missouri (BA)
- Occupations: Journalist, writer
- Years active: 2002-present
- Employer(s): TED, National Public Radio, Vice News
- Spouse: Matt Stiles (div. 2021)
- Children: 3

Elise Hu (born February 17, 1982) is an American broadcast journalist. She hosts the TED Talks Daily podcast, co-hosts Forever35 and serves as host-at-large for NPR. From 2015 to 2018, she was NPR’s first bureau chief in Seoul, South Korea.

== Early life and education ==
Hu was born in St. Louis, Missouri, and grew up in suburban Missouri and Texas. Her father defected from China during the Cultural Revolution in the 1960s, and her mother is from Taiwan. She has a younger brother, Roger.

Hu graduated from Plano Senior High School in Plano, Texas. During high school, she and friends were paid $100 each to appear in national 7-Up advertisements, after which agents scouted Hu to work as a model for a few years into college.

Hu earned a bachelor's degree in broadcast journalism from the University of Missouri School of Journalism in 2003. During college, she interned at WFAA-TV in Dallas.

== Career ==
Hu began her career as a television reporter for stations including KWTX-TV, KVUE-TV and WYFF-TV, and then was among the founding journalists at the Texas Tribune, a digital news startup.

She joined NPR in 2011 and opened the Seoul bureau in early 2015, where she oversaw coverage of South Korea, North Korea and Japan. She hosted the NPR video series Elise Tries, which received a Gracie Award from the Alliance for Women in Media Foundation, and Future You with Elise Hu.

In 2020, Hu co-founded the podcast production company Reasonable Volume. She continued working at NPR as a host-at-large, filling in on programs such as It's Been a Minute. She also started contributing to Vice News as a correspondent.

Hu is on the board of directors for Grist.org and is a member of the Council on Foreign Relations.

Her book, Flawless: Lessons in Looks and Culture from the K-Beauty Capital was published by E.P. Dutton, an imprint of Penguin Random House, in May 2023. It explores South Korea's global influence in beauty and how a digital society narrows global appearance ideals.

== Awards and recognition ==
Hu’s reporting has been honored with a National Edward R. Murrow Award for Video, a Gannett Foundation Award for Innovation in Watchdog Journalism, and beat reporting awards from the Texas Associated Press. The Austin Chronicle twice named her "Best of Austin" for reporting and social media work.

== Personal life ==
Hu lives in Los Angeles, California. She has three daughters with Matt Stiles, a journalist; they divorced in 2021. She speaks Mandarin Chinese.
