= Evan Smith (journalist) =

American journalist (born 1966)

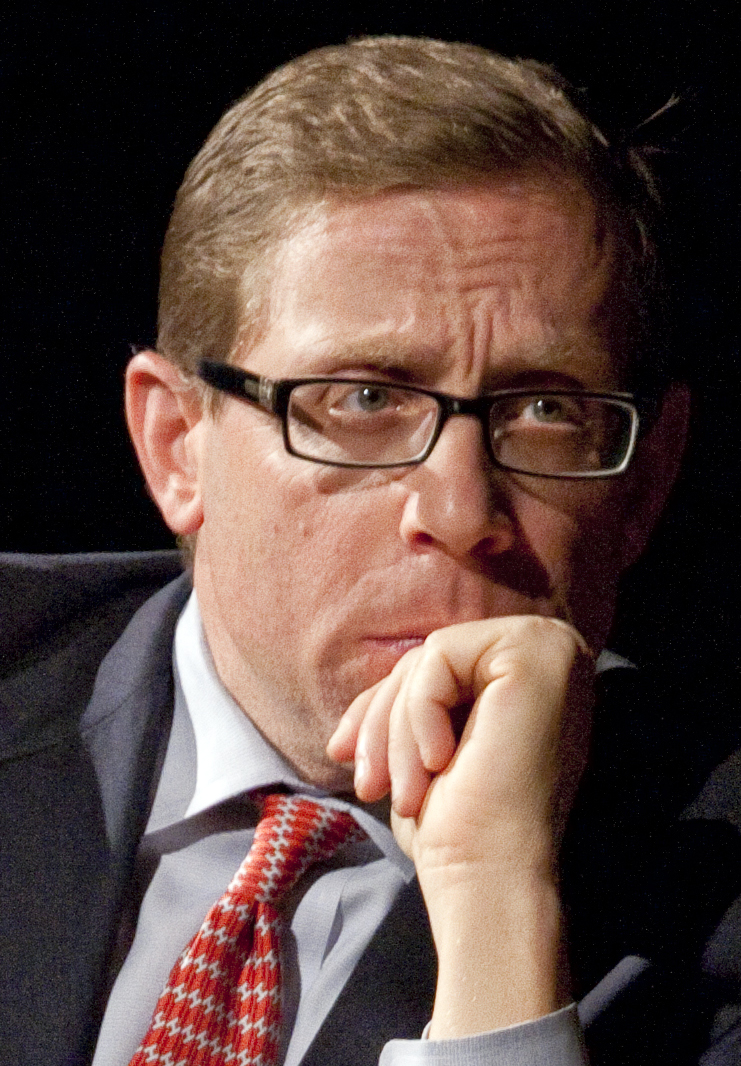
- Smith at the LBJ Presidential Library, 2012
- Born: April 20, 1966 (age 59); New York City, U.S.
- Occupation: Journalist
- Education: Hamilton College (BA); Northwestern University (MA)

Evan Smith (born April 20, 1966) is an American journalist. He is the former CEO of The Texas Tribune and host of the weekly interview program Overheard with Evan Smith.

== Early life and education ==
Born in New York, Smith has a bachelor's degree in public policy from Hamilton College and a master's degree in journalism from the Medill School of Journalism at Northwestern University (which inducted him into its Hall of Achievement in April 2006).

== Career ==
Since September 2010, he has hosted Overheard with Evan Smith, a weekly interview program produced by KLRU that airs on PBS stations nationally.

=== Texas Monthly ===
Smith joined the staff of Texas Monthly as a senior editor in January 1992. In February 1993, he was promoted to deputy editor, and in July 2000, he was made editor. In May 2002, he added the title of executive vice president. He announced his intention to resign on July 17, 2009, and stepped down on August 21, 2009.

=== Texas Tribune ===
Smith co-founded the Texas Tribune, an online, nonprofit, non-partisan public media organization, with Austin venture capitalist John Thornton and veteran journalist Ross Ramsey. It launched on November 3, 2009. In January 2022, Smith announced his intentions to step down from his role as CEO by the year's end.
