= The Texas Tribune =

Non-profit news organization covering politics and public policy in Texas

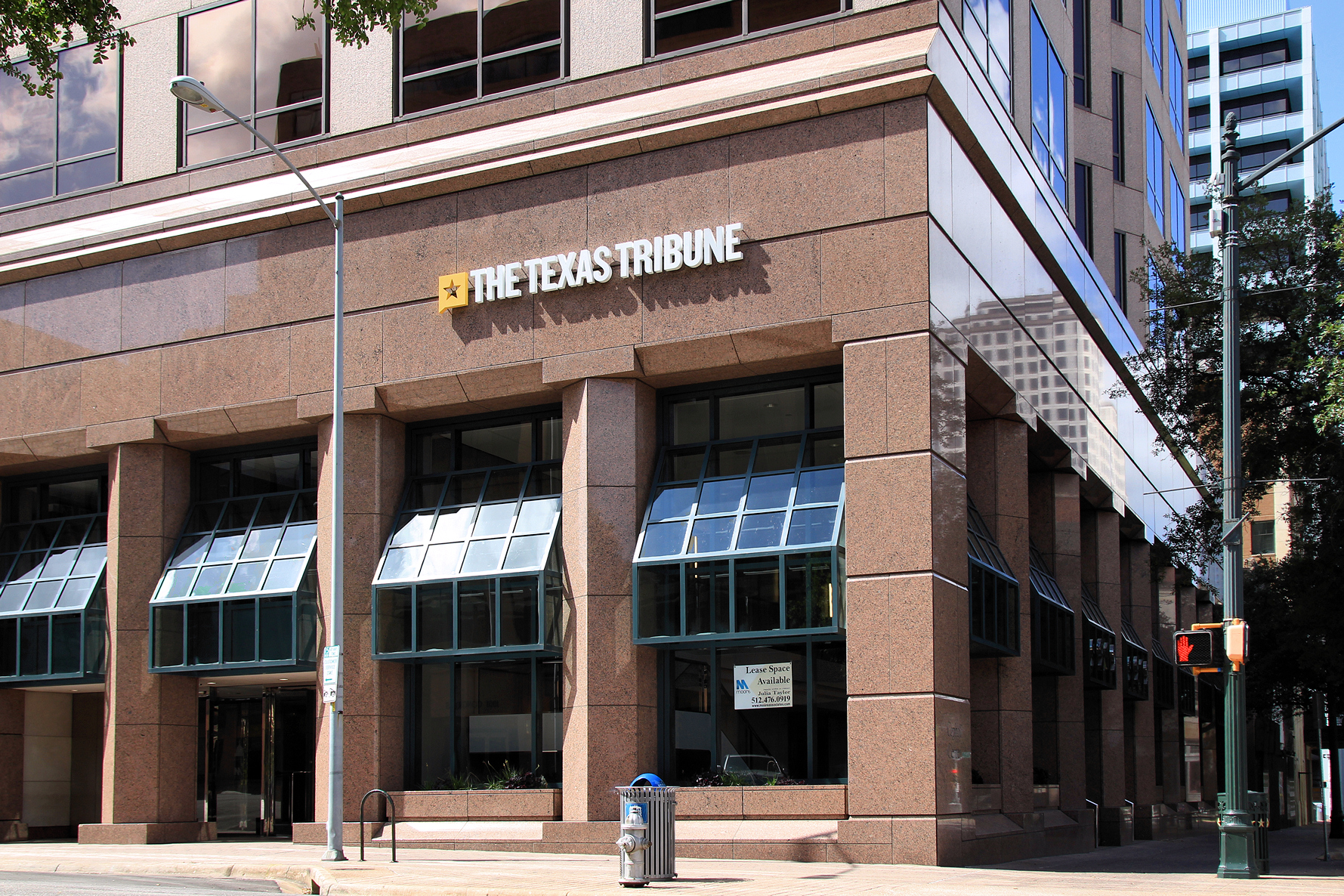
- Sign for the Texas Tribune offices at the Capitol Center in Downtown Austin
- Type: Nonprofit
- Format: Web
- Founder(s): John Thornton; Evan Smith; Ross Ramsey
- Editor-in-chief: Matthew Watkins
- CEO: Sarah Adler Hartman
- Founded: 2009; 17 years ago
- Headquarters: 919 Congress Avenue; Austin, Texas, United States; 30.271557°N 97.741243°W
- ISSN: 0897-2710
- OCLC number: 465271495
- Website: www.texastribune.org

The Texas Tribune is a nonprofit politics and public policy news website headquartered in Austin, Texas, United States. Its stated aim is to promote civic engagement through original, explanatory journalism and public events.

The Texas Tribune, like the Voice of San Diego and MinnPost before it, is part of a trend toward web-based, nonprofit journalism.

In addition to journalism published on its news website, the Tribune permits content re-publication both online and in print.

The Texas Tribune hosts various events and conferences including the Texas Tribune Festival, which attracts national journalists and politicians for interviews and forums.

== History ==
The organization was created in 2009 by venture capitalist John Thornton and veteran journalists Evan Smith and Ross Ramsey. The idea for the organization originated with Thornton, who spent much of 2008 and 2009 promoting public interest in the concept of journalism as a public good. Thornton wrote, in July 2009:

In Micro 101, we learn that such "public goods" as clean air and national defense will not be produced in sufficient supply exclusively by market forces. Allow for the sake of argument that what I'll call "capital J" Journalism – journalism that takes on serious, complex issues and puts them in the context of how citizens interact with their government – is such a good.

Thornton and his wife, Julie, seeded the venture with $1 million of their own money to fund the organization's nascent operations and began to raise money from around the state and around the country from individuals, corporations, and foundations.

An additional $2.5 million donated by various foundations and Texas philanthropists including former Democratic Lt. Governor Ben Barnes, financier T. Boone Pickens and businessman Red McCombs. Pickens in particular donated $150,000. Foundations donated about $1.1 million, including a total of $750,000 in grants from the Houston Endowment. The Sid W. Richardson Foundation of Fort Worth also gave a $100,000 operating grant beginning from 2015 and continues to provide an operating grant. The John S. and James L. Knight Foundation donated $250,000 in late 2009, and their subsequent donations totaled $2 million by December 2016. That month, they announced that they would match up to $25,000 in gifts of $1,000 or less pledged to the Tribune between then and January 19, 2017. Most of the 68 corporate sponsors made a $2,500 commitment as co-founders of the publication. Thornton stated in January 2010, "In the coming months, we intend to become far more sophisticated in the way we market corporate sponsorships of both our site and our events series, TribLive."

Thornton hired Smith, the longtime editor of Texas Monthly, to be CEO and editor-in-chief of the Tribune, and the two recruited Ramsey, the longtime editor and owner of Texas Weekly, to be managing editor. Smith and Ramsey subsequently hired several well-known members of the Capitol press corps to join the team: Matt Stiles, of the Houston Chronicle; Emily Ramshaw, of the Dallas Morning News; Brandi Grissom, of the El Paso Times; Elise Hu, of KVUE-TV; and Reeve Hamilton, who covered the Texas Legislature for The Texas Observer. Morgan Smith, formerly of Slate, started writing for the Tribune in January 2010.

Thornton raised more than US$2 million before the project was made public in July 2009. By the time The Texas Tribune debuted on November 3, 2009, it had raised $3.6 million from more than 1,000 individual donors and at least fifty corporate sponsors.

The Texas Tribune has been actively developing an open source publishing platform along with The Bay Citizen, specifically tailored for nonprofit news organizations like itself. The system, named Armstrong, was funded through a $975,000 grant from the John S. and James L. Knight Foundation. It is based on technology the Tribune has been using since 2009.

In March 2025, Tribune founder John Thornton died. He was 59.

== Personnel ==
Sarah Adler Hartman became chief executive officer of The Texas Tribune in 2026, succeeding Sonal Shah.

Brian Thevenot, a two-time Pulitzer Prize winner who was formerly special projects editor for The Times Picayune of New Orleans, joined the staff in October 2009. He has since left the Tribune, and is now business editor at the St. Louis Post-Dispatch. Elise Hu departed in 2011 to join NPR in Washington, D.C., and Matt Stiles later joined her at NPR.

In May 2011, the Tribune announced the hiring of Jay Root, formerly of the Fort Worth Star-Telegram and the Associated Press, who had twice been named Staff Writer of the Year by the Associated Press.

Effective October 18, 2021, Sewell Chan was named editor-in-chief. Following Chan's departure to the Columbia Journalism Review, Matthew Watkins was made editor-in-chief on September 9, 2024.

In August 2023, the Tribune underwent its first round of layoffs in the publication's history.

== Funders ==
The Texas Tribune is funded through donations from individuals, corporations, and foundations.

== See also ==
- CalMatters
- Institute for Nonprofit News
- States Newsroom
