= McMillen High School =

C.A. McMillen High School

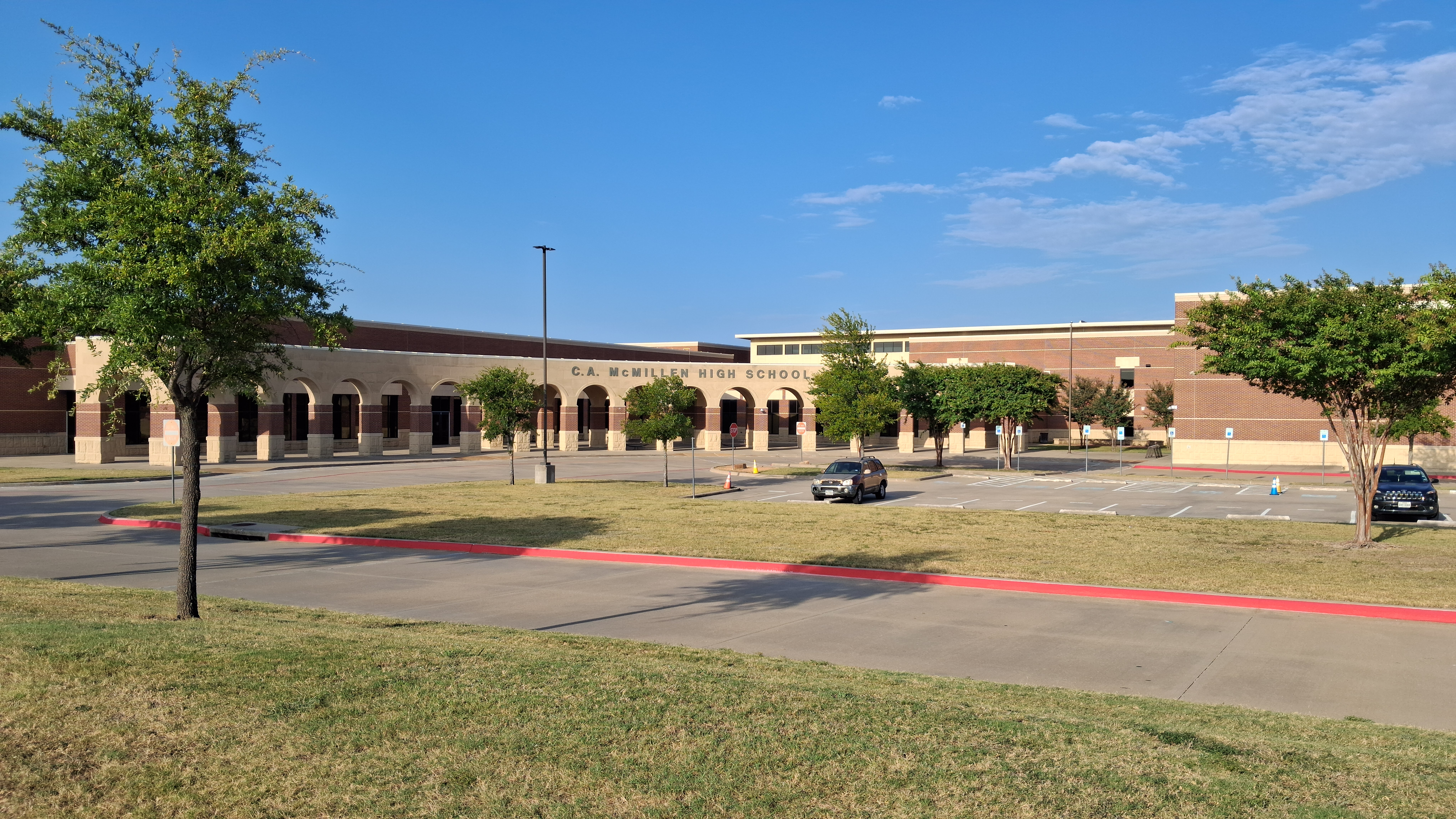
- A stone arcade at the front entrance of McMillen High School.

Location
- 750 North Murphy Road; Murphy, Texas; United States; 33.028133°N 96.610598°W

Information
- Type: Free public
- Motto: Cultivating our potential yields a thoughtful revolution.
- Established: 2011
- School district: Plano Independent School District
- Principal: John Tedford
- Faculty: 66.46 (FTE)
- Grades: 9th and 10th
- Enrollment: 1,100 (2023-2024)
- Student to teacher ratio: 16.55
- Campus size: 282,000 square feet
- Campus type: Suburban
- Colors: Black and Gold
- Mascot: Panther
- Website: mcmillen.pisd.edu

C.A. McMillen High School, commonly known as McMillen High School, McMillen, or MHS, is a secondary school serving grades nine and ten, located in the East Cluster of the Plano Independent School District. Murphy Middle School and Armstrong Middle School feed into McMillen. Students graduating from McMillen will attend Plano East Senior High School for the eleventh and twelfth grades. For the 2021–2022 school year, the school received a rating of "C" by the Texas Education Agency.

== History ==
C.A. McMillen High School is named in honor of Comfort Allen McMillen, a farmer who owned large tracts of land in what is now the city of Murphy, Texas and founder of the Corinth Presbyterian Church.

McMillen High School's inaugural year was 2011–2012, with doors opening in August 2011. It is Plano Independent School District's sixth (and last) 9-10 high school and was built to relieve overcrowding at nearby T. H. Williams High School. The first principal, George King, helped to plan and oversee the design and construction of the campus.

== Design and construction ==
The 282,000 square-foot two-story high school was designed by the SHW architectural firm, and the construction of the school was given to the Cadence McShane Companies, who completed the project under-budget at $37,074,743. Situated on the same site as Murphy Middle School and Tom Kimbrough Stadium, McMillen High School was designed to complement the architectural style of the adjacent facilities.

The high school's exterior façade is composed of structural steel, masonry, and cast stone. McMillen has a total of 67 classrooms, 10 science laboratories, band and music spaces, library, competition and practice gymnasiums, an auditorium, and a full-service cafeteria and kitchen. The campus also has several athletic venues, such as a practice softball and baseball field, batting cages, a running track, and practice football fields. McMillen athletes compete at the adjacent Tom Kimbrough Stadium in sports such as football and track. The school also has a parking lot with 224 parking spaces.

Because McMillen was built in 2011, the campus features many unique design and architectural aspects that are not found at any other school in the district. SHW Group designed the 278,800 SF building to include a series of both formal and informal learning spaces. Each education wing is intended to promote collaboration between students and teachers in both the "pod" (an innovative learning and gathering area featuring whiteboards, study tables, and chairs) and the classrooms surrounding it. The pods were designed to provide flexibility and additional space for instruction, discussion, and project work. The campus also features comfortable seating areas and café tables for the students.

Instead of having dry erase boards, each classroom at McMillen has one wall coated in IdeaPaint, which allows the whole wall, from floor to ceiling, to be written on. The "board" also doubles as a projection screen and allows teachers and students to write on the images shown on the wall.

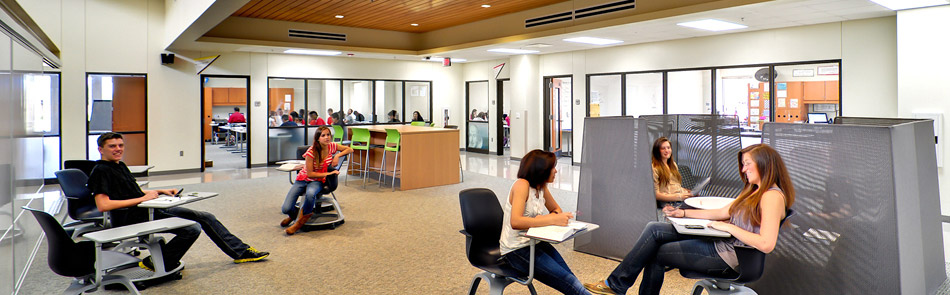
One of the campus's learning centers.

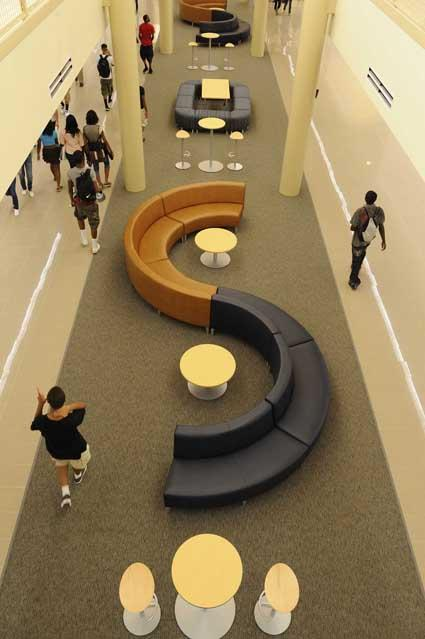
The main hallway of McMillen.

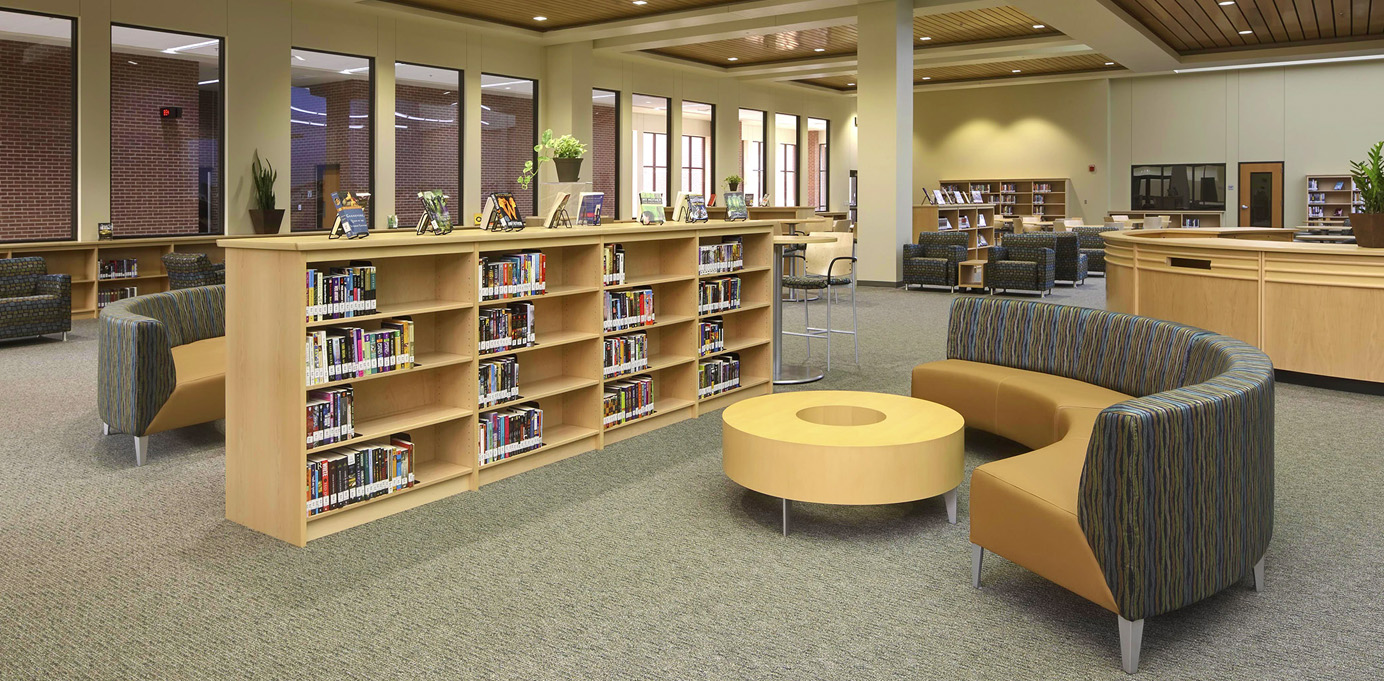
The library.

== Principals ==
Brad Bailey is the current head principal, taking the lead in November 2023. Todd Williams was the former head principal from the fall of 2021 until November 2023. He replaced Brian Lions, who is now the current head of Plano ISD's Director for Diversity, Equity & Inclusion.

Current assistant principals are Nick King, Kamden Kneisel, Mary Cabrera, and Kamili Carthlege.

== Students ==
In 2023, the enrollment at McMillen is about 1,220.

In the 2015–2016 school year, McMillen High School, along with two other Plano ISD 9-10 campuses (Jasper High School and Shepton High School), piloted a block lunch program, in which all students are on lunch at the same time during the day. "Lions Lunch" at McMillen is 72 minutes long and was designed as an opportunity for failing students to attend tutorials. In Spring 2016, McMillen instituted mandatory academic tutorials during the first half of "Lions Lunch" for students failing 2 or more classes.

A small handful of middle school students (often from adjacent Murphy Middle School) take 7th period mathematics courses at McMillen that are not offered at their middle school. These courses include Geometry and Algebra 2. Exceptional mathematics students also have the option of sitting in on one of McMillen's Pre-Calculus classes.

School hours are 9:00 AM–4:25 PM, with doors opening at 8:00 AM and the building usually remaining open until about 5:30 PM for after school activities. McMillen High School is a closed campus, meaning that all students must remain inside the building during school hours.

== Academics ==
Like most other Plano ISD 9-10 high schools, McMillen offers 4 AP (Advanced Placement) classes; AP Human Geography, AP World History, and AP European History (elective), AP Computer Science Principles. AP students at McMillen can choose to take the AP exam for their corresponding classes, offered each May by the College Board. Students earning a 3, 4, or 5 on the AP exam may be eligible for college credit.

Like the other five Plano Independent School District 9-10 high schools, McMillen offers a Humanities class for gifted-and-talented (GT) students as a continuation from the elementary school and middle school PACE (Plano Academic Creative Education) program. Humanities is a one-period class that students take for two years. Though both 9th and 10th grade students are sitting in the same classroom and learning the same content, 9th grade students earn a Pre-AP English I credit (4.5 GPA) and 10th grade students earn an AP World History credit (5.0 GPA). The Humanities course curriculum follows the AP World History course but is split between two years (Humanities I and Humanities II).

In addition to the AP courses McMillen High School offers, the campus also has a range of On-Level and Pre-AP (Honors) courses for students to choose from, as well as various electives such as Advancement Via Individual Determination (AVID), Peer Assistance and Leadership (PALs), fine arts, art, engineering, and computer technology.

McMillen students can choose from a variety of foreign language classes, including Spanish, French, German, Latin (available online), Chinese, and American Sign Language.

== Extracurricular activities ==
McMillen offers band, choir, orchestra, theater, PALS, athletics, Student Senate, HOSA Future Health Professionals, National Honor Society (NHS), Library Teen Advisory Board, Drill Team, [National Art Honor Society] (NAHS) and Marching Band (named the Golden Roar Marching Band). Other organizations have been founded by McMillen students in recent years, including COBALT (Corporation of Business and Law Technology), Mock Trial and McMillen UNICEF.

=== Athletics ===
The school colors are black and gold, and the school mascot is the Panther as of the 2023–2024 school year. Plano East Senior High School, McMillen High School, and Williams High School all now don the black and gold for the Panthers.

The McMillen Panthers compete in the following sports:

- Baseball
- Basketball
- Drill Team (the McMillen Dazzlers)
- Football
- Soccer
- Tennis
- Volleyball
- Wrestling

Athletes in select sports, such as swimming, must travel to Plano East Senior High School to compete. Students with stellar athletic ability may choose to compete with the Plano East athletic teams instead of with the McMillen athletic teams.

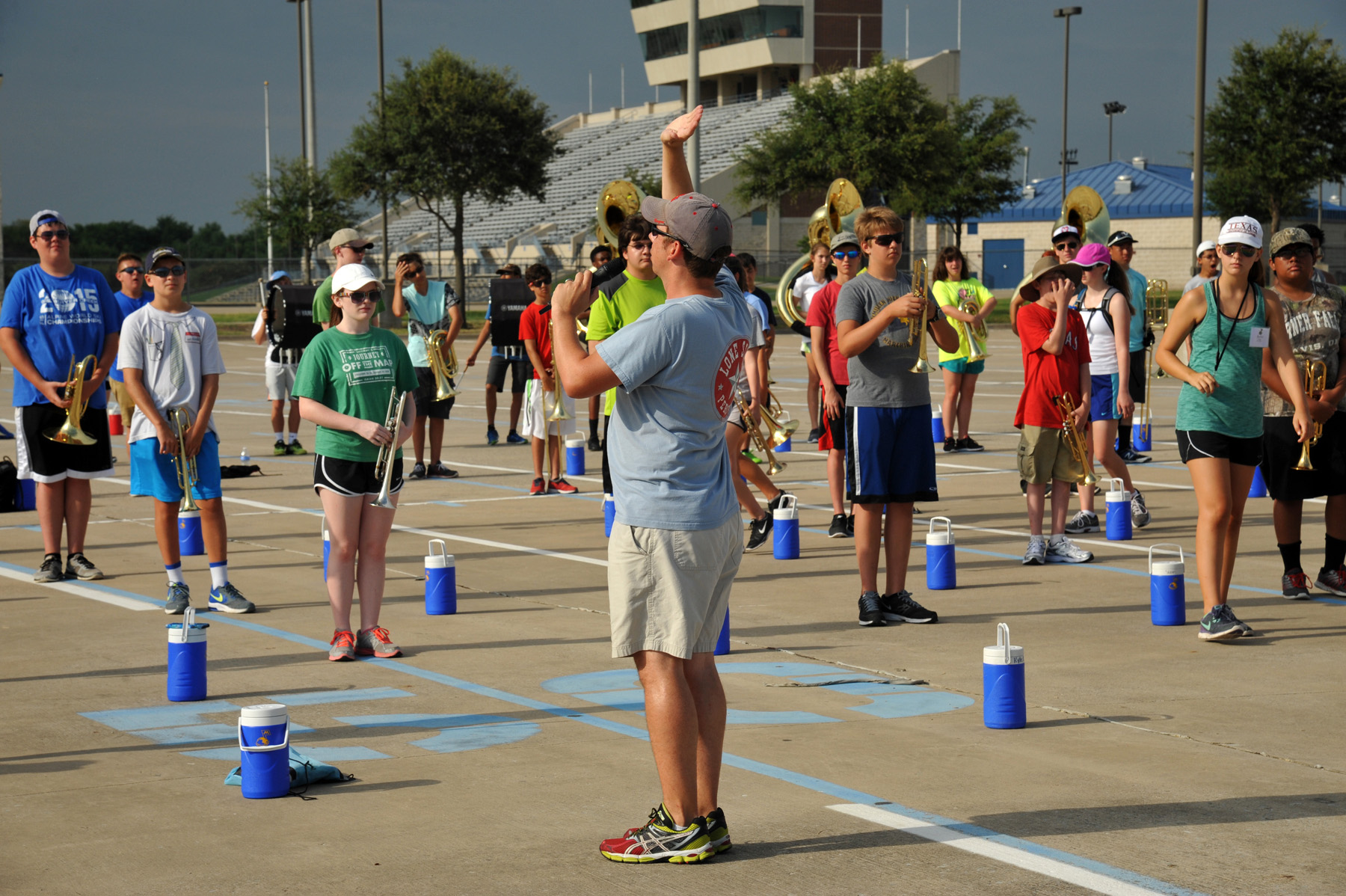
The 2015-2016 McMillen marching band practices its marching routine in the summer months.

=== Music programs ===
McMillen offers Band, Orchestra and Choir classes. Their marching shows over the past years were Pirates of the Caribbean (2012), Arabian Nights (2013), Frozen (2014), Holst's The Planets (2015), New World Symphony (2016), Time (2017), and Blend (2018)

The bands, orchestras, and choirs perform in University Interscholastic League (UIL) festivals, as well as local music contests, such as the Choice Music Events. McMillen also hosts the Plano Independent School District East Cluster Solo & Ensemble Festival each spring for orchestra students.

== See also ==
- Clark High School
- Jasper High School
- Shepton High School
- Vines High School
- Williams High School
- Plano East Senior High School
- Plano Senior High School
- Plano West Senior High School
