= Shepton High School =

Location
- 5505 West Plano Parkway; Plano, Texas 75093; United States; 33.01724°N 96.81169°W

Information
- School type: Free public
- Motto: Teamwork for Excellence in a Caring Atmosphere
- Established: 1984
- School district: Plano ISD
- NCES School ID: 483510006028
- Principal: Andrew Jacob
- Teaching staff: 83.03 (FTE)
- Grades: 9th and 10th
- Enrollment: 1,360 (2024-2025)
- Student to teacher ratio: 15.99
- Colors: Blue, Black, and White
- Mascot: Wolf
- Website: https://www.pisd.edu/shepton

Shepton High School is a secondary school in Plano, Texas (USA), serving grades nine (9) and 10 as part of the Plano Independent School District (PISD).

In Plano ISD, high school freshmen and sophomores attend one of six high school campuses —Shepton, Jasper, Clark, Williams, Vines, and McMillen — before advancing to one of the district's three senior high schools for grades 11 and 12. Renner and Frankford middle schools feed into Shepton High School, which in turn feeds into Plano West Senior High School along with Jasper High School.

Shepton High School maintains a population of over 1,500 students. Kathy King was the principal for eight years ending with the 2005-2006 school year. Burt Smith held the role from 2006–12, during which he won the Texas Association of School Administrators "Administrator of the Year" award for the region.

As of the 2024-2025 school year, Shepton enrolled approximately 1,360 students, making it the largest of PISD's six freshman/sophomore campuses by enrollment, with a student-to-teacher ratio of roughly 16 to 1.

The current principal of Shepton High School is Andrew Jacob, who was appointed in 2025.

== History ==
=== Founding and early years ===
Shepton High School opened in 1984 at its current campus on West Plano Parkway, built on land once owned by Joseph W. Shepard. To accommodate growth in the district, the school relocated in 1990 to a larger facility on Parker Road—later the site of Plano West Senior High School—before returning to its original campus in 1998.

=== Leadership ===
Currently, the principal of Shepton High School is Andrew Jacob, in addition to four assistant principals – Stacy Whisenhunt Guerra, Brian Vincer, Tiffany Alexander, and Derek Phillips.

- Kathy King

Kathy King served as principal for eight years, through the 2005-06 school year.

- Burt Smith

Burt Smith served as principal from 2006 to 2012; during his tenure he was named Region 10 High School Principal of the Year for 2010-2011.

- William McLaughlin

William McLaughlin served as principal from 2013 to 2016 before moving into a district-level human resources role.

- Courtney Washington

Courtney Washington was appointed principal in 2023 and served through the 2024-2025 school year.

- Andrew Jacob

Andrew Jacob was appointed principal beginning with the 2025-2026 school year; his prior roles in the district included administrative intern at Shepton and assistant/associate principal at Plano Senior High School.

=== 2016 bond and renovation ===
In May 2016, Plano ISD voters approved a $481 million bond package by a margin of nearly 79 percent (79%), which funded major renovations at Shepton High School and Robinson Middle School along with projects at other district campuses including refurbishments at Barksdale, Gulledge, Rosemary Haggar Elementary, Haun, Miller and Skaggs Elementary Schools, Bowman and Wilson Middle Schools and Jasper and Williams High Schools.

Other specific proposed uses by the Facilities and Technology Task Force (appointed by the Plano ISD Board of Trustees in August 2015) included:

- Construction of a Plano ISD performing arts and multipurpose facility;
- District-wide improvements to technology infrastructure and additional equipment to support classroom technologies;
- Plans for a fourth early childhood center in conjunction with planned expansion of pre-k opportunities;
- Safety and security upgrades spanning access control systems, security camera systems, emergency communication equipment, campus panic alarms, security upgrades for senior high schools, and safety upgrades for Clark Stadium;
- Funding allocated to replace 90 school buses as they reach the end of their 15-year useful life; and
- Proposed upgrades to athletic facilities such as replacing artificial turf at Clark Stadium and the three senior high school indoor practice facilities, adding artificial turf at the Clark Triple Fields, Williams High School Field and the three senior high school outdoor practice fields, replacing the scoreboard at Clark Stadium, adding locker rooms on home/visitor sides of Clark East Field, a locker room renovation at Plano East Senior High School and baseball bleacher enhancements/expansions.

== Academics ==
=== Curriculum ===
Shepton offers Advanced Placement coursework, including nine AP courses with open self-selection enrollment, alongside a Project Lead The Way (PLTW) engineering and technology pathway and a Gifted and Talented program. The school also offers Advancement Via Individual Determination (AVID), career and technical education, English as a second language instruction ("ESL"), and special education services.

=== Performance ===
For the 2024-2025 accountability cycle, the Texas Education Agency ("TEA") assigned Shepton a state accountability rating of "D", based on student achievement, school progress, and closing performance gaps; Plano ISD as a whole received a "B" rating during the same cycle.

As of the 2023-24 school year, the campus enrolled 1,404 students, of whom 47.6 percent (47.6%) were identified as "at risk of dropping out" and 30.1 percent (30.1%) were enrolled in bilingual or English-language-learning programs.

Enrollment stood at 1,190 students as of 2026, a decline of 22.5 percent (22.5%) since 2016.

Since Shepton is a 9th/10th-grade-only campus with no graduating class, standard four-year graduation-rate metrics don't apply to it directly.

== Student life ==
=== Athletics ===
As a freshman and sophomore campus, Shepton does not field its own UIL varsity athletic program; students compete at the varsity level through its feeder school, Plano West. The campus fields its own freshman and junior varsity teams, including football and basketball, which feed into Plano West's varsity program.

==== 2023 mascot change (from Stallions to Wolves) ====
In 2023, Plano ISD undertook a district-wide "athletic alignment program" intended to unify branding between its freshman/sophomore campuses and their feeder senior high schools; as part of this initiative, Shepton's athletic mascot changed from the Stallions to the Wolves, matching Plano West, effective with the 2023-24 school year.

==== 'Stallionettes' cheer and drill teams ====
The campus fields its own cheerleading and drill team programs; the drill team, known as the Stallionettes, perform at football games, pep rallies, and an annual spring show..

=== Fine arts ===
The Shepton Chamber Orchestra received a Mark of Excellence in a national competition during the 2010-11 school year.

==== Thespian troupe ====
The school's theatre program has participated in the UIL's One Act Play competition and shares a Thespian troupe (Troupe 6101) with Plano West and Jasper High Schools; 10 Shepton students reportedly attended the 2025 Texas Thespian State Festival as part of that troupe.

==== Debate ====
Shepton's speech and debate program shares faculty with Plano West's, which is independently ranked among the top 10 high school speech and debate programs in the country by the National Speech & Debate Association.

== Awards ==
Shepton has received recognition for student participation in athletics, business, fine arts, and other programs.

- 2010-2011
  - Shepton's Chamber Orchestra, under director Joshua Thompson, was named a National Winner in the National Orchestra Honors Project, which was part of the Foundation for Music Education's Mark of Excellence competition.
  - Principal Burt Smith was named TASSP Region 10 High School Principal of the Year.
- 2023
  - Teacher Melanie Lin, a ninth- and tenth-grade instructor and AVID coordinator at Shepton, was recognized by the Texas House of Representatives as the school's 2023 Teacher of the Year.

== See also ==
- Jasper High School
- Plano West Senior High School
- Plano East Senior High School
- Plano Senior High School
- Plano Independent School District
