= Tom Kimbrough Stadium =

Stadium in Murphy, Texas, USA

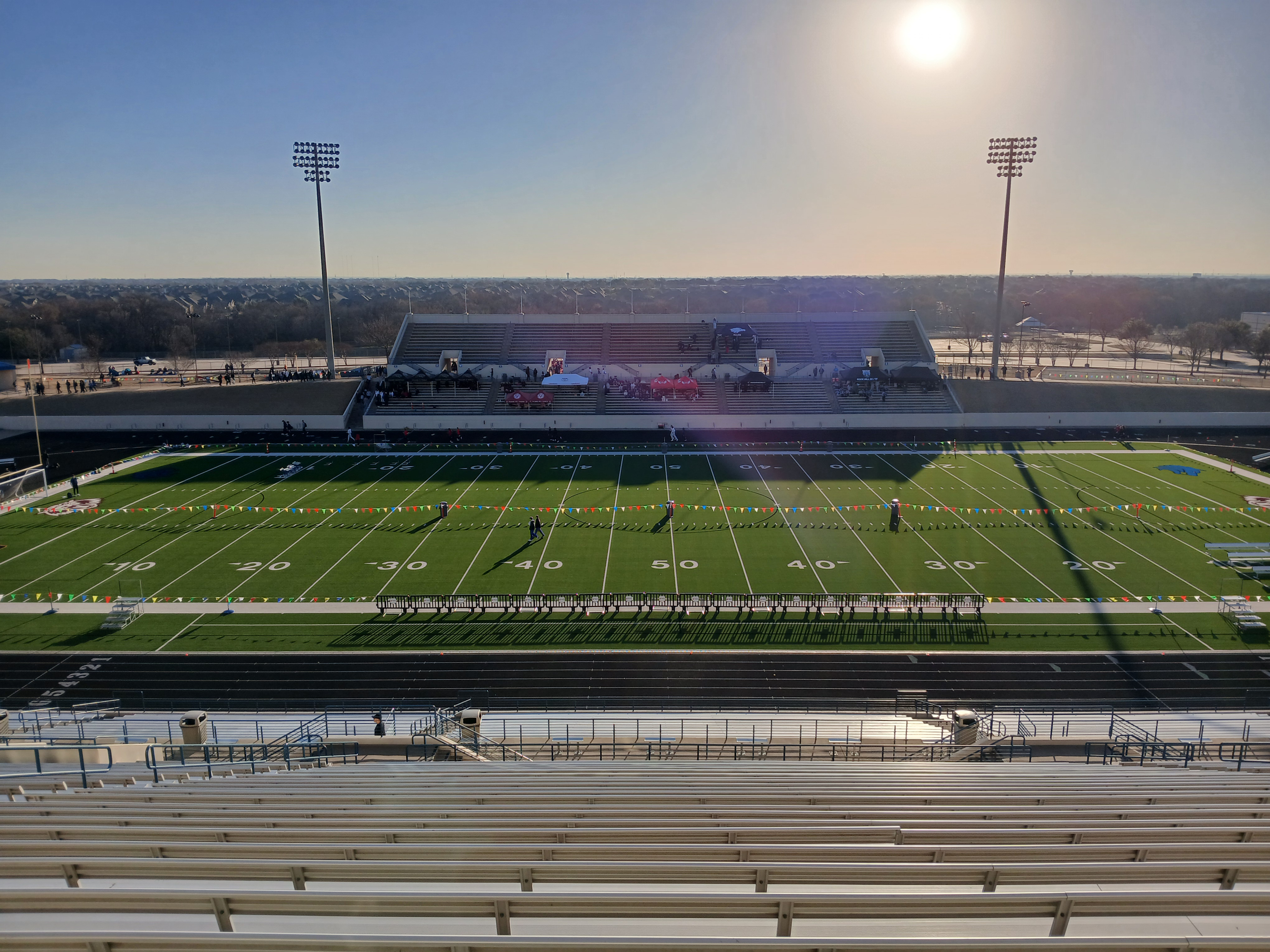
- Interactive map of Tom Kimbrough Stadium
- Location: Murphy, TX
- Owner: Plano ISD
- Capacity: 9,800

Construction
- Built: 2003
- Opened: Fall 2003

Tenant
- Plano East Panthers (UIL) (2003–present)

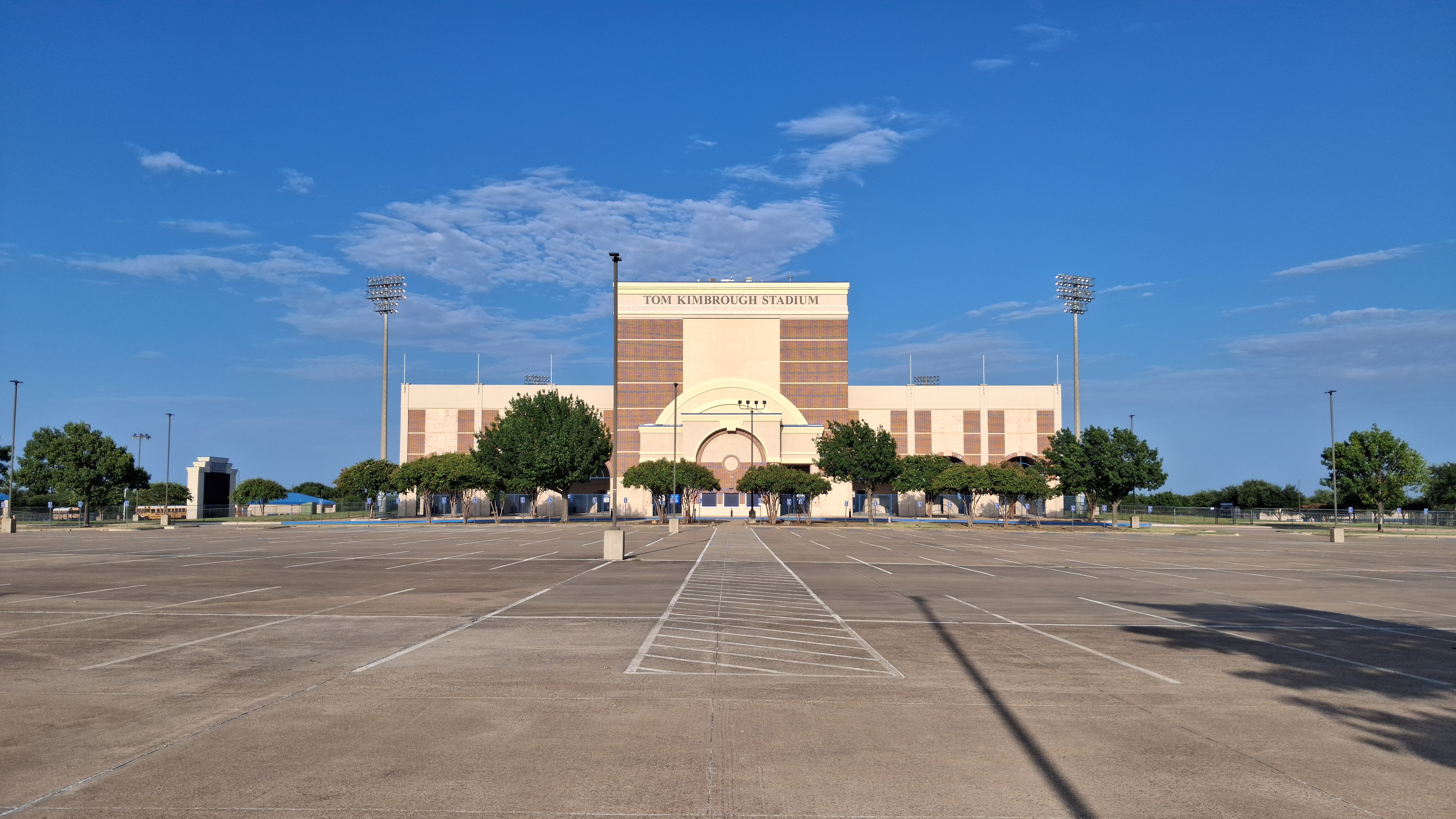
front building entering

Tom Kimbrough Stadium is a 9,800-capacity multi-use high school football stadium in Murphy, Texas. Mostly used for high school football, soccer, and track, the stadium was built in 2003 and is owned by the Plano Independent School District. It is the home stadium of Plano East Senior High School.

== Namesake ==
The stadium was named after Tom Kimbrough, the former Head Football Coach of Plano Senior High School and Plano ISD Athletic Director. He succeeded John Clark the coach and athletic director for whom John Clark Stadium was named. Under Kimbrough's direction, the Plano Wildcats football team won three state championships.
