= Comfort Allen McMillen =

Comfort Allen "C.A." McMillen was born on January 12, 1818, in Washington County, Arkansas, to Lewis McMillen and Charlotte Joy. McMillen married Lydia Maxwell. McMillen and Lydia started their journey to Texas in 1845 and arrived on January 1, 1846, on the banks of a creek (now called Maxwell Creek). The McMillen family were able to get land at the cost of 25 cents an acre. The families near the creek built a robust farming community called Old Decator (present day Murphy, Texas).

Large amounts of his land were given to the city of Murphy for industrial usage. Some of his land was given to the Corinth Presbyterian Church (one of the oldest church congregations of Collin County, which was founded on August 2, 1846) in Parker, Texas, where he was a founding member known for his pious nature and devotion to the Bible. His wife, Lydia, died in 1907. McMillen died on September 16, 1914. He was the oldest citizen in Collin County and passed away at the age of 96.

McMillen High School, founded in 2011, in Plano, Texas, is named in honor of the farmer, businessman, and church founder.

== Sources ==
- "About Murphy - Murphy Chamber of Commerce, TX". murphychamber.org.
- "Schools & Other Facilities / McMillen High School Landing Page". Plano Independent School District.
- "Churches". rootsweb.ancestry.com.
- "Oldest Citizen Died Tuesday Night". Courier-Gazette. McKinney, Texas.
