= Plano Archgate Park =

Park in Plane, Texas, USA

Coordinates: 33°3′42″N 96°47′5″W

Archgate Park is located in the city of Plano, Texas. The park is adjacent to Jasper High School in Plano. The park is situated in middle-class neighbourhood and is very popular with kids, walkers, joggers and bicyclists. It has multiple playgrounds with ample car parking, drinking fountain, restrooms, hike/bike trail, shade pavilion and a small pond. There is a basketball court and kids play area as well. The park is well maintained and is very safe and secure. Bluebonnet recreational trail passes through this park.
