= Plano ISD Academy High School =

Location
- 1701 Alma Drive; Plano, Collin County, Texas; United States; 33.022714°N 96.719444°W

Information
- Type: STEAM, Interdisciplinary, and Project-Based Learning Public High School
- Established: 2013
- School district: Plano ISD
- Superintendent: Sara Bonser
- NCES School ID: 483510012675
- Principal: Josh Howard
- Grades: 9–12
- Enrollment: 275 (2026–2027 school year)
- Student to teacher ratio: 11.56 (2026–2027 school year)
- Colors: Blue and Silver
- Mascot: Titan
- Feeder schools: Plano ISD Middle Schools
- Website: www.pisd.edu/academy

Plano ISD Academy High School, commonly referred to as Academy High School, is a STEAM, interdisciplinary and project-based learning high school. The school serves students from grades 9-12. This school is not a regular secondary school because this school uses a selection process to draw eighth graders from various middle schools in Plano ISD. The school is an alternative to the regular high school experience by offering collaborative team projects, more STEAM classes and the ability to attend classes without structured class periods. This school is one of the four Academy Programs in Plano ISD. The others are the Plano ISD Health Sciences Academy, Plano Wildcat Collegiate Academy and The IB World School at Plano East.

== Campus ==
The building is a three-story, former office building that belonged to Bell South, and later, AT&T.

In the summer of 2013, the PISD renovated the building and turned the building into a creative learning school. The school is an open floor plan school with classrooms that are dubbed Learning Spaces. There are three science labs, a fabrication lab, three presentation rooms, library, and conference rooms. The school also contains two dedicated soundproof rooms for student and club use.

== Curriculum ==
The Plano Academy was designed for experimental project learning and advanced studies. Because of the project-based learning, students are able to work independently or in a group with less teacher management. Graduating students are required to have at least one internship by their senior year. As part of the curriculum, all students graduate with the same foundational coursework. There is 1:1 technology at the Academy, meaning every student is provided with a school-issued MacBook Air. Some notable projects include developing and zoning a plan for the city of Plano, creating and managing a company with innovative products, designing a video game, and launching projectiles. In their senior year, students are required to make an in-depth and wide-reaching capstone project that spans the entire year.

=== Academics ===
The school offers the basic classes required to graduate in the state of Texas. Seniors have the option to not take an art course to give more time towards their capstone. Unique types of classes called "project time" or "capstone time" are used to give students independent work times with teacher facilitation. Advanced Placement is offered for most classes.

=== Unique terminology ===
The Academy has adopted traditions of using unique terms to describe people and places in the school:

- Grade levels, rather than being called "freshman, sophomores, etc.," are referred to as "first-years, second-years, etc."
- Due to the unique space of the Academy, rather than calling each divided space a classroom, they are called "learning spaces", "Project Areas", and "Labs" depending on the purposes of the area; furthermore, some of these names are commonly abbreviated, such as "LS" and "PA".
- Students are commonly referred to as "learners."
- Teachers are referred to as "facilitators." This is because they do more than teach; they facilitate learning.

== History ==
The Academy Visioning Committee started designing the plan for the school in 2010. Texas Instruments and other companies endowed the new school. In 2013, PISD held a lottery to determine which students are able to attend. In the first year of Academy's opening, students were learning multiple classes combined into a single project. Student-led organizations and PTSA also hosted several fundraising and school events such as the Winter Social, and the paintball tournament. The Academy has also allowed visitors from around the Dallas community to see the school's learning environment. The Academy's first graduating class graduated in the spring of 2016.

== Elevators ==
Academy High School has two elevators. They are next to each other and near to the entrance. While the school has 3 floors, the elevator has buttons going up to the fourth floor. There are several theories on the origin of this fourth floor, such as it bringing the elevator to the roof, and that the button was disabled for the safety of the students.

== Clubs ==
The Academy offers over 20 clubs. Most clubs meet during school time. NHS and student council meet after school each week as well. Clubs include journalism, film, motorsports, and many other interests.

=== Theater Club ===
The Theater Club has tech and does plays and musicals.

=== Dnd Club ===
The D&D Club is a student organization dedicated to role-playing games (RPGs), including Dungeons & Dragons and other RPGs. Members arrange sessions with their campaign groups.

=== E-Sports Club ===
The E-Sports club is a competitive club that offers an opportunity for Learners to practice their skills in a variety of video games, including Valorant and Rocket League.

=== Dance Club ===
The Dance Club is a club where Learners work on school spirit routines, ballet, hip-hop, and acro. At first starting out as a club for former, current, and new dancers to refine their skills and routines, the Dance Club morphed into a school spirit/cheer squad, performing during pep rallies and spirit events.

=== PEPC ===
PEPC or Personal Electronics Projects Club is a club run at AHS. PEPC is a cloud focused on everything electronic, from high-voltage to Linux. PEPC first started by taking over the old RC club assets and now gets electronic donations to recycle, reuse, and use as a teaching tool to teach people all about sorts.

=== RC Club ===
The RC Club of AHS was a club from 2023 to 2025. RC Club was a club for members to do many RC-related things, like diving, repairing, and learning all about RC cars, plans, and boats. RC Club was available in the 2023-2024 and 2024-2025 school seasons: RC Club was disbanded because new rules regarding clubs in the 2025-2026 school year.

=== Robotics Club ===
The Titan Robotics Club won the Rookie All-Star Award at the 2015 Dallas Regional FRC Competition. Team 5431 went on to Nationals in St. Louis, Missouri (from April 22–25, 2015) and made to Carver Field Quarterfinals.

Titan Robotics entered in the Lone Star and Dallas Regional FRC competition in 2016. Team 5431 went on to Nationals in St. Louis, Missouri (from April 22–25, 2016) and made to Carver Field Quarterfinals.

In 2017, Titan Robotics competed in the FIRST Steamworks competition, going to the Dallas and Brazos Valley regionals. They were wild-carded and went on to Nationals in Houston, Texas and made it to the Hopper field playoffs.

In 2018, Titan Robotics competed in the FIRST Power Up Competition. This year they went to Dallas and El Paso regionals.

For the 2019 Season, Titan Robotics competed in the FIRST Destination: Deep Space competition. After competitive play and points for awards, the team had enough points to qualify for Nationals in Houston. They competed in the Galileo division. Once the team finished their qualification matches they had seeded 15th overall. They were picked up into the 4th alliance captain. (Team 3128 – Aluminum Narwhals) Titan Robotics was knocked out in the quarterfinals.

== See also ==
- Plano ISD
- STEAM
