= Jasper High School =

Jasper High School can refer to:

- Jasper High School (Alabama), Jasper, Alabama
- Jasper High School (Arkansas), Jasper, Arkansas
- Jasper High School (Indiana), Jasper, Indiana
- Jasper High School (Missouri), Jasper, Missouri
- Jasper High School (Jasper, Texas), Jasper, Texas
- Jasper High School (Plano, Texas), Plano, Texas
- Jasper County High School (Georgia), Monticello, Georgia
- Jasper County High School (South Carolina), Ridgeland, South Carolina
- Jasper–Troupsburg High School, Jasper, New York
