= Murphy, Texas =

- City
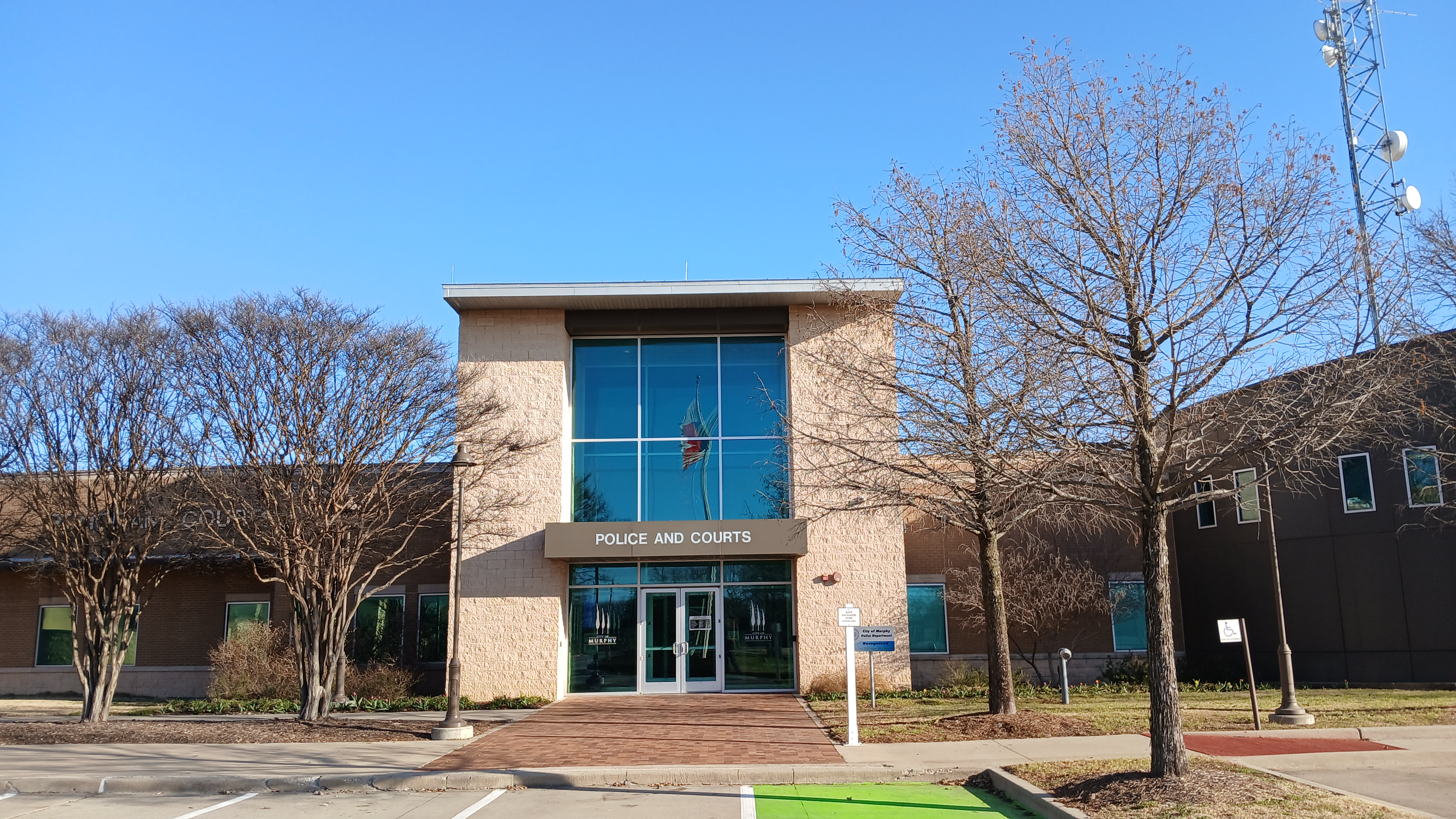
- Murphy Municipal Court and Police

- Location of Murphy in Collin County, Texas
- Coordinates: 33°01′51″N 96°36′47″W
- Country: United States of America
- State: Texas
- County: Collin

Government
  - Type: Council-Manager
  - Mayor: Scott Bradley

Area
  - Total: 5.70 sq mi (14.76 km^{2})
  - Land: 5.70 sq mi (14.75 km^{2})
  - Water: 0.0039 sq mi (0.01 km^{2})
- Elevation: 581 ft (177 m)

Population (2020)
  - Total: 21,013
  - Density: 3,686.49/sq mi (1,423.36/km^{2})
- Time zone: UTC-6 (CST)
  - Summer (DST): UTC-5 (CDT)
- ZIP codes: 75074, 75094
- Area codes: 214, 469, 945, 972
- FIPS code: 48-50100
- GNIS feature ID: 2411197
- Website: murphytx.org

Murphy is a suburban city in Collin County, Texas, United States. The 2020 census reported the population as 21,013 compared to 3,099 in 2000. Murphy is located northeast of Dallas and has a history that goes back to the late 1800s.

== History ==
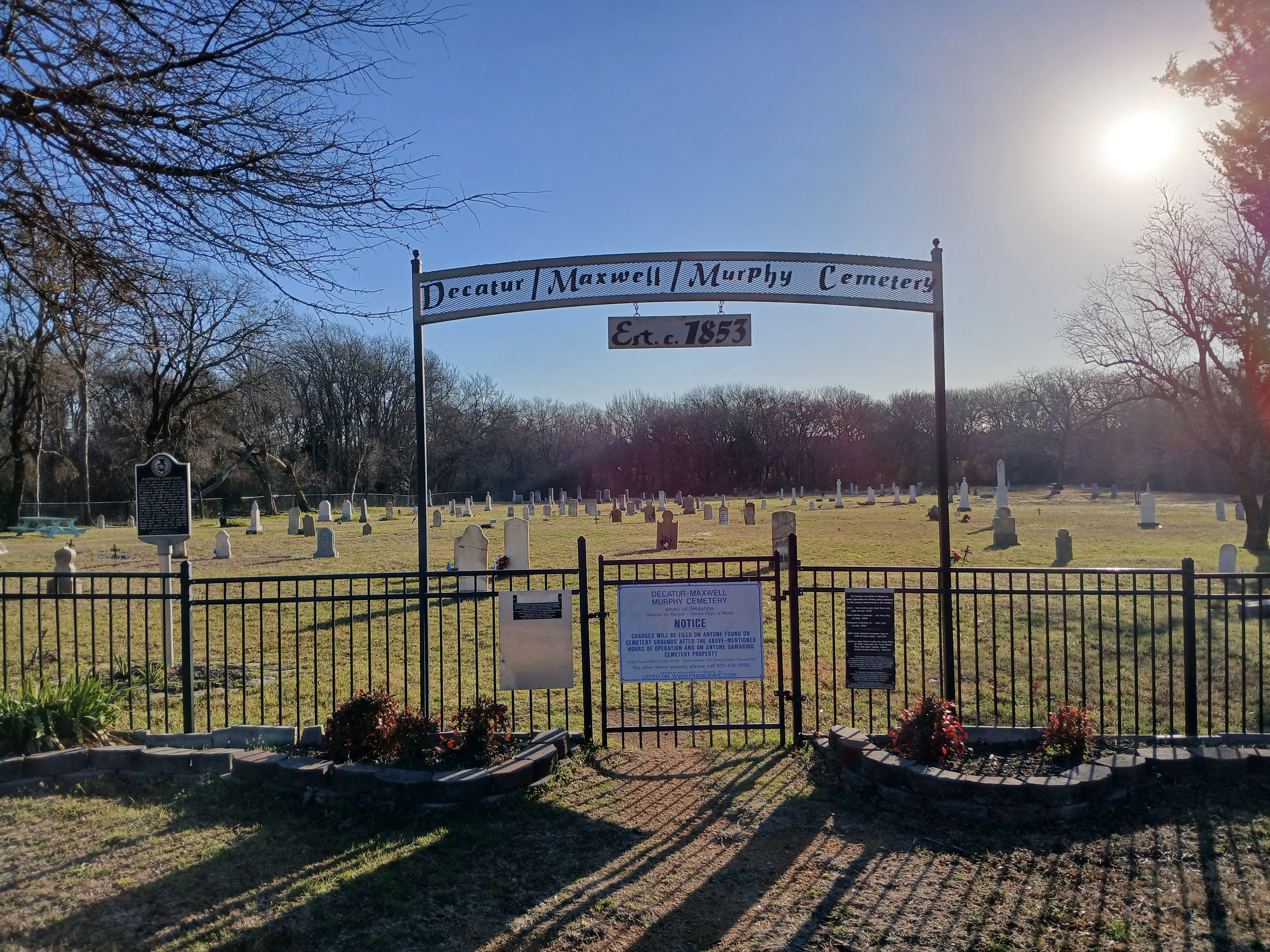
Decatur Maxwell Murphy Cemetery

Attracted by the offer of land grants from the Peters colony, the first settlers of the community arrived in the area in 1846. The original townsite, located on land owned by C. A. McMillen, was first called "Old Decator," after McMillen's hometown.

== Geography ==
Murphy is located in southern Collin County, within the Dallas–Fort Worth metroplex. Situated midway between Plano and Wylie on FM 544, Murphy is 2 miles (3 km) south of the famous Southfork Ranch. Murphy shares borders with Plano to the west, Richardson to the southwest, Sachse to the south, Wylie to the east, and Parker to the north. It is 22 miles (35 km) northeast of downtown Dallas and about 34 miles (55 km) east of Dallas/Fort Worth International Airport.

Several subdivisions have begun building and are occupied. The newest approved development is 470 acres (1.9 km^{2}) on the northeast side of the city along Maxwell Creek. The country living theme is expressed in this development by a linear park, which includes a hike-and-bike trail. Murphy Marketplace is the dominant shopping center in the city. Built-in 2008, the center now contains numerous restaurants and services and encompasses the northeast quadrant of the North Murphy Road and East FM 544 Intersection. The municipal complex comprises a total of five buildings to serve Fire, Police, City Administration, and Public Works, as well as a 2014 addition of the PSA Murphy sports center.

With the opening of the President George Bush Turnpike, access to the West became a reality in 1999. Highways are a significant factor in the growth of the economy of southeast Collin County. The impact on Murphy was seen in rapid expansion of new homes built after 1999. The population in late 2002 was about 6,500, and grew to around 12,000 in 2006. The 2010 census reported a population of 17,708. The city was rated #7 in the "Best Places to Live" survey of Dallas Suburbs in the July 2008 D Magazine and #9 in the 2010 edition of the article. (By comparison, Dallas was #54, and neighboring Plano was #18.) In 2011, the city was rated #27 in America by "Money's list of America's best small towns". In 2017, Murphy was ranked #2 among over 35,000 US cities and towns, without regard to size, by the "Area Vibes" website.

According to the United States Census Bureau, the city has a total area of 5.6 square miles (14.6 km^{2}), of which 0.004 square miles (0.01 km^{2}), or 0.08%, is water.

=== Climate ===
Murphy is considered to be part of the humid subtropical region.

== Demographics ==
Historical population
Census	Pop.	Note	%±
1960	135		—
1970	261		93.3%
1980	1,150		340.6%
1990	1,547		34.5%
2000	3,099		100.3%
2010	17,708		471.4%
2020	21,013		18.7%
2023 (est.)	20,920		−0.4%

=== 2020 census ===
As of the 2020 census, there were 21,013 people, 5,964 households, and 5,143 families residing in the city.

The median age was 39.0 years, 30.2% of residents were under the age of 18, and 10.0% of residents were 65 years of age or older. For every 100 females there were 98.1 males, and for every 100 females age 18 and over there were 95.8 males.

100.0% of residents lived in urban areas, while 0.0% lived in rural areas.

There were 5,964 households in Murphy, of which 55.9% had children under the age of 18 living in them. Of all households, 79.8% were married-couple households, 7.0% were households with a male householder and no spouse or partner present, and 11.3% were households with a female householder and no spouse or partner present. About 7.5% of all households were made up of individuals and 3.4% had someone living alone who was 65 years of age or older.

There were 6,083 housing units, of which 2.0% were vacant. The homeowner vacancy rate was 0.8% and the rental vacancy rate was 2.9%.

Racial composition as of the 2020 census
Race	Number	Percent
White	10,219	48.6%
Black or African American	2,111	10.0%
American Indian and Alaska Native	83	0.4%
Asian	6,366	30.3%
Native Hawaiian and Other Pacific Islander	18	0.1%
Some other race	407	1.9%
Two or more races	1,809	8.6%
Hispanic or Latino (of any race)	1,711	8.1%

=== 2000 census ===
As of the census of 2000, there were 3,099 people, 1,030 households, and 909 families residing in the city. The population density was 589.7 inhabitants per square mile (227.7/km^{2}). There were 1,126 housing units at an average density of 214.3 per square mile (82.7/km^{2}).

Per the 2000 census, the racial makeup of the city was 76.06% White, 9.52% African American, 1.10% Native American, 9.07% Asian, 2.00% from other races, and 2.26% from two or more races. Hispanic or Latino of any race were 4.94% of the population.

There were 1,030 households, out of which 82.7% had children under the age of 18 living with them, 83.8% were married couples living together, 2.9% had a female householder with no husband present, and 10.8% were non-families. 8.3% of all households were made up of individuals, and 6.5% had someone living alone who was 65 years of age or older. The average household size was 2.73 and the average family size was 3.18.

The median age for residents in Murphy is 33.9 (this is younger than the average age in the U.S.).

Families (non-single residences) represent 88.3% of the population, giving Murphy a higher-than-average concentration of families.

In the city, the population was spread out, with 29.7% under the age of 18, 5.1% from 18 to 24, 37.8% from 25 to 44, 20.5% from 45 to 64, and 5.0% who were 65 years of age or older. The median age was 33.9 years. For every 100 females, there were 100.5 males. For every 100 females age 18 and over, there were 100 males.

=== Income and poverty ===
By 2019, the average household income had risen to $146,779, and the average income for a family was $147,818. The median income for men was $86,601, and the median for women was $61,221. The per capita income for the city was $39,934. About 4.7% of the population were below the poverty line, including 2.8% under age 18 and 5.9% over the age of 65.

== Parks and recreation ==
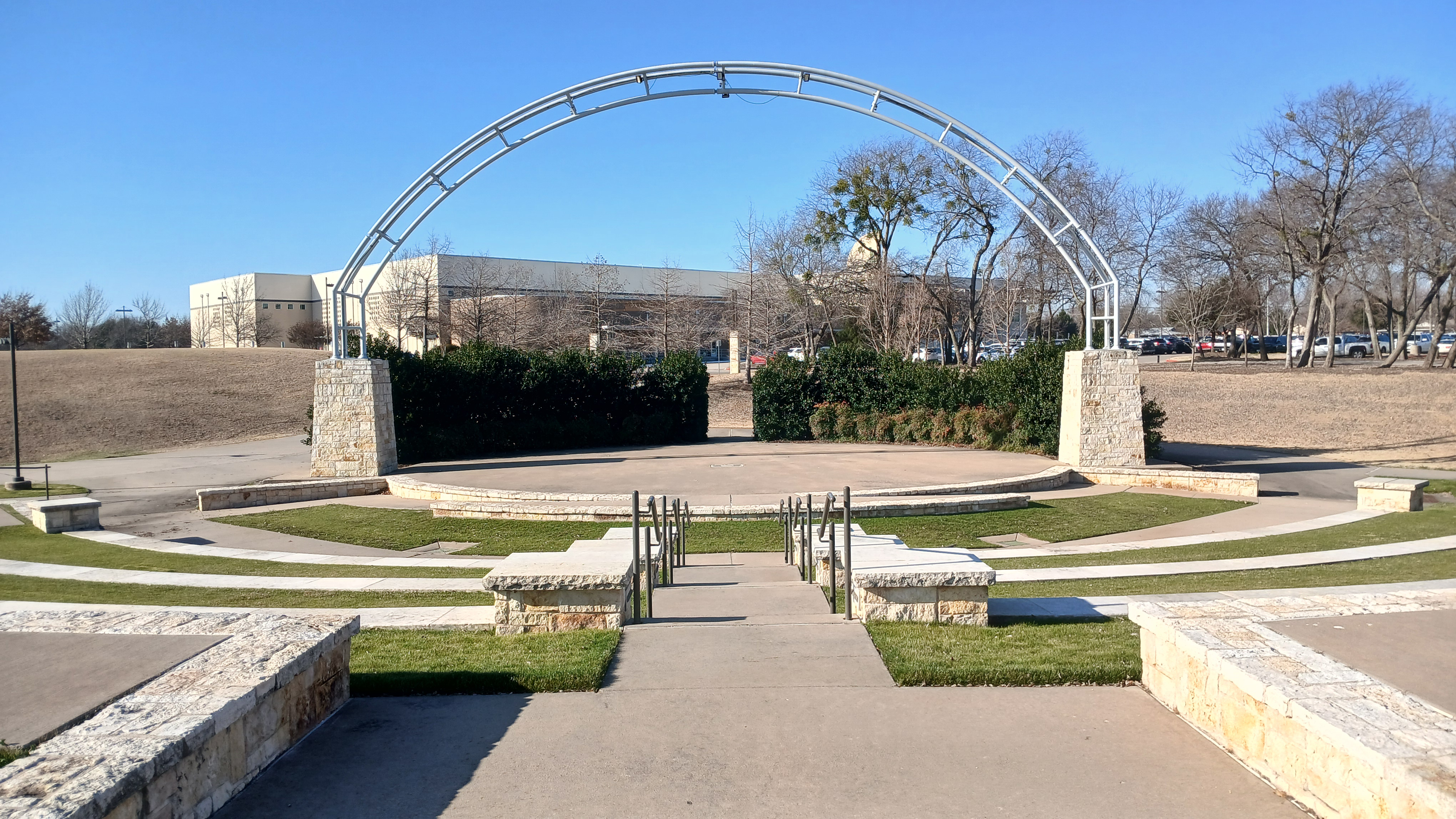
Amphitheater at Murphy Central Park

The city of Murphy operates and maintains 10 parks totaling to 195.5 acres (0.8 km^{2}) of land. The largest of these parks is Murphy Central Park operates on 60 acres of land. The park contains an amphitheater, a 2 acre pond, and 5 acres of sports fields. In addition, the park contains 0.6 miles of trail that connect to the Maxwell Creek Trail.

== Government ==
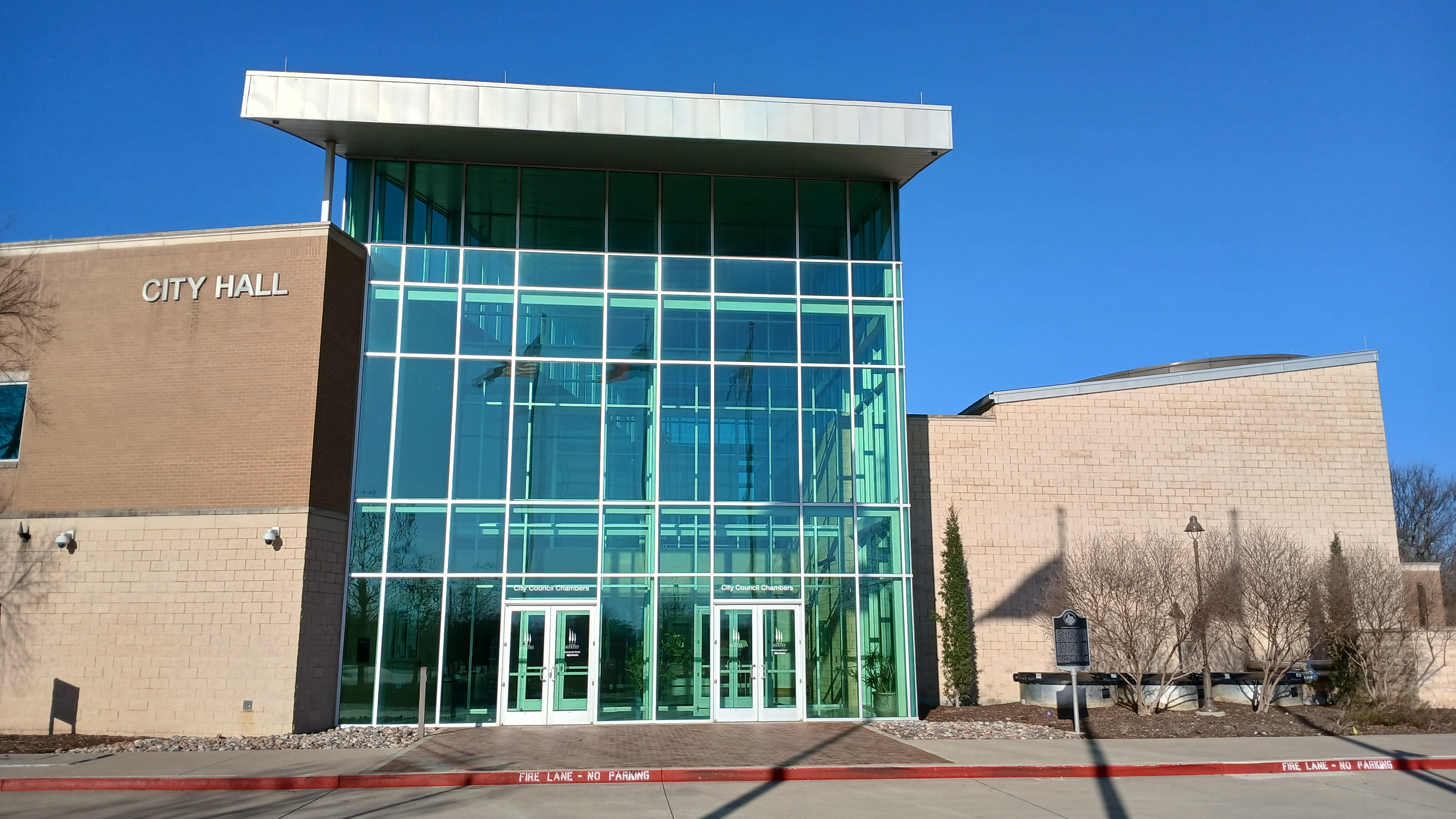
Murphy City Council

The city of Murphy adopted a Home Rule Charter in 2003, and the city's power is vested in a council of elected individuals who regulate, legislate, and appoint other officials, such as the City Manager, who heads the executive branch. The city council members as of 2026 are Scott Bradley (Mayor), Jene Butler, Scott Smith, Debbie Ison, Kevin Kelley, Ken Oltmann, and Elizabeth Abraham. Scott Bradley was elected mayor in 2017. Aretha Adams is the City Manager, who was appointed to this position in February 2024.

=== Politics ===
Murphy, like the rest of Collin County, was solidly Republican throughout the early 2000s. Still, it has shifted significantly towards the Democratic Party in recent elections, culminating in Democrat Joe Biden's narrow victory in the city in 2020.

Murphy city vote by party in Presidential elections
Year	Democratic	Republican	Third Parties
2020	51.04% 5,518	47.36% 5,120	1.60% 173
2016	43.73% 3,575	51.94% 4,246	4.33% 354
2012	36.12% 2,460	62.32% 4,244	1.56% 106
2008	37.80% 2,787	60.98% 4,497	1.22% 90
2004	28.19% 1,322	71.00% 3,329	0.81% 38
2000	23.14% 323	74.57% 1,041	2.29% 32

=== NBC Dateline deal ===
The Murphy police department made a deal with "Dateline" in 2006 to allow NBC camera crews to record stings of alleged Internet sexual predators and to let people hired by "Dateline" actually set up and run the sting. The production ended tragically when one of the alleged offenders, Louis Conradt, an assistant district attorney from a neighboring county, died by suicide when Dateline NBC cameras showed up at his home in the company of Murphy police after the man failed to show up to the sting house.

== Education ==
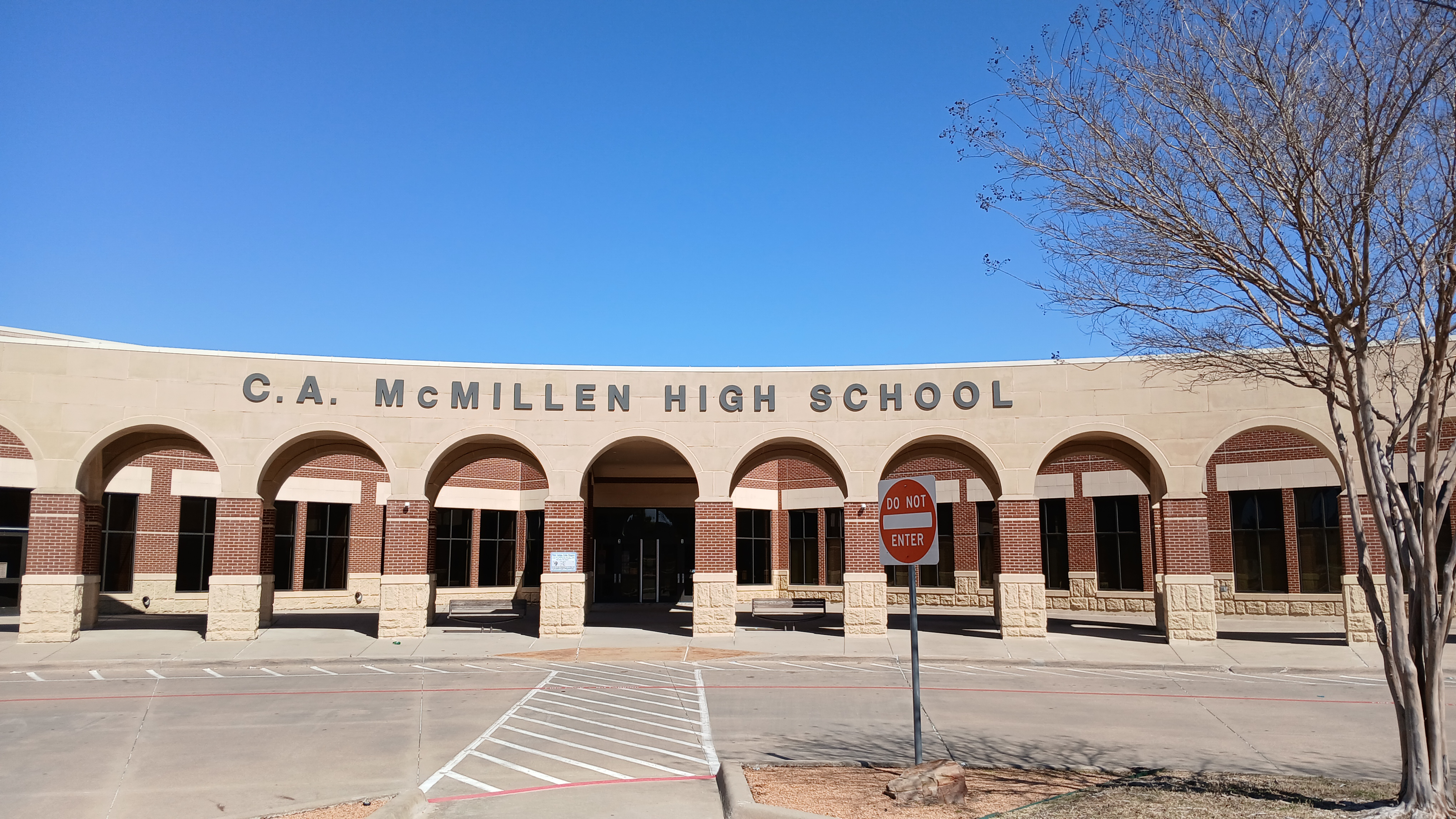
McMillen High School

=== Primary and secondary schools ===
==== Public schools ====
A portion of Murphy is served by the Plano Independent School District, while another portion is served by the Wylie Independent School District.

===== Plano Independent School District =====
The Plano ISD section of Murphy is served by the following schools:

Elementary schools (separate attendance boundaries):

- Boggess Elementary School (Murphy)
- Martha Hunt Elementary School (Murphy)
- Miller Elementary School (Richardson)

Middle schools (separate attendance boundaries):

- Murphy Middle School (Murphy)

High schools:

- McMillen High School (Grades 9–10) (Murphy) (opened fall 2011)
- Plano East Senior High School (Grades 11–12) (Plano)

Prior to the opening of McMillen, T. H. Williams High School in Plano served Murphy.

===== Wylie Independent School District =====
The Wylie ISD section of Murphy is served by the following schools:

Elementary schools (separate attendance boundaries)

- Harry and Retha Tibbals Elementary School (K–4) (Murphy)
- Don Whitt Elementary School (K–4) (Wylie ISD, located in Sachse)

Secondary schools

- Draper Intermediate School (5–6) (Wylie)
- Raymond B. Cooper Junior High School (7–8) (Wylie)
- Wylie High School (9–12) (Wylie)
