= Clark High School (Plano, Texas) =

R.C. Clark High School
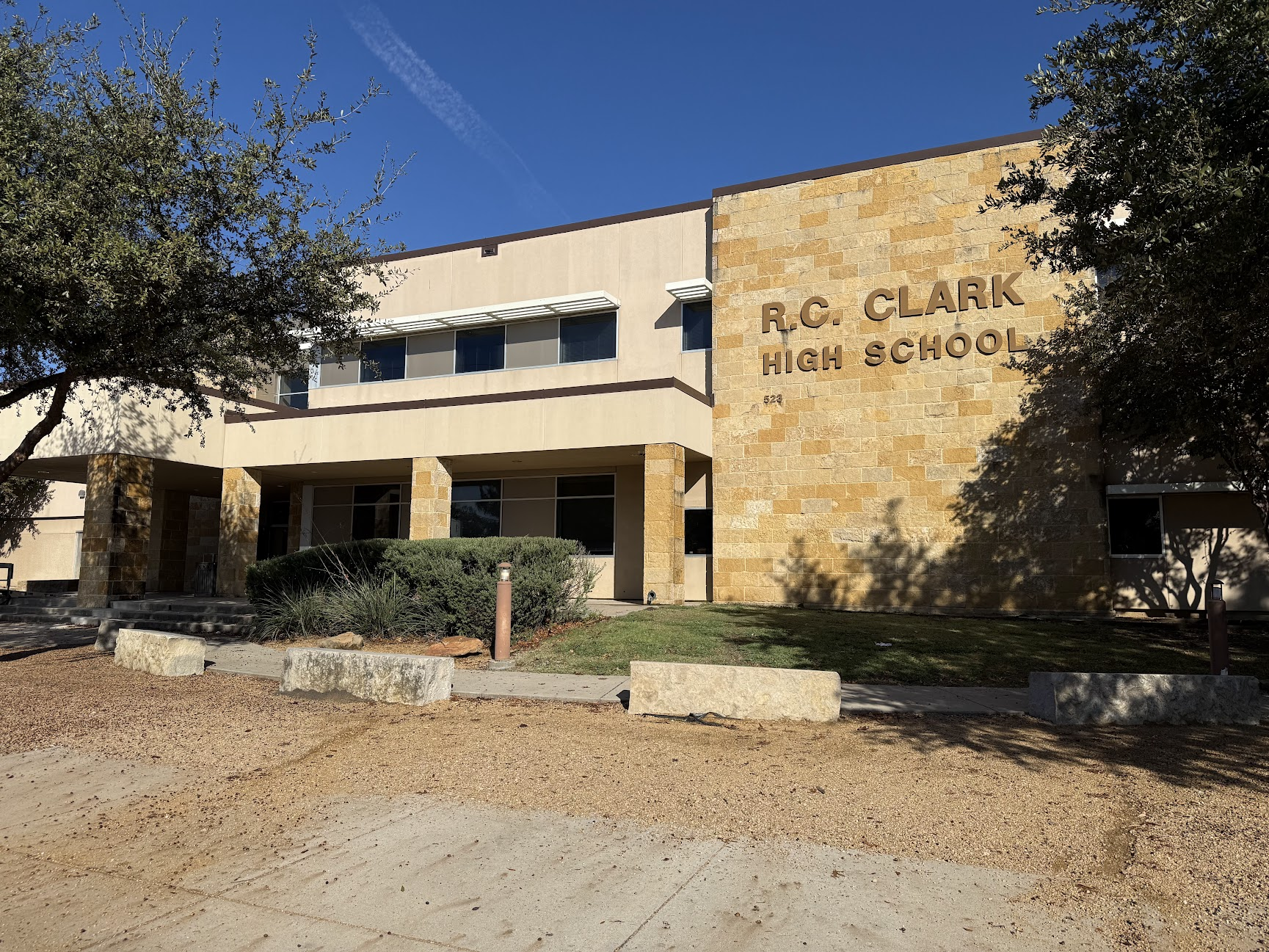

Location
- 523 West Spring Creek Parkway; Plano, Texas; United States; 33.0585°N 96.7031°W

Information
- Type: Free public
- Established: 1979
- School district: Plano Independent School District
- Principal: Gregory Pierce
- Teaching staff: 81.18 (FTE)
- Grades: 9th and 10th
- Enrollment: 1,241 (2023-2024)
- Student to teacher ratio: 15.29
- Campus type: Suburban
- Colors: Maroon
- Mascot: Wildcat
- Website: clark.pisd.edu

R. C. Clark High School is a co-educational secondary school in Plano, Texas (USA) serving grades nine and ten. Founded in 1979, the school is part of the Plano Independent School District. Hendrick Middle School and Schimelpfenig Middle School feed into Clark. Students leaving Clark go on to attend Plano Senior High School. The school colors are red, white, and black, and the school mascot is the Wildcats.

The high school added a new wing to the building for the 2012-2013 school year due to overcrowding in the old building. The new building houses science, art, and foreign language classes.

== History ==
Clark High School is named in honor of Richard Calhoun Clark, a pioneer, and farmer who served in the Civil War under General R.W. Carpenter after the death of his father.

=== Previous feeder schools ===
Previously, only Carpenter and Hendrick Middle Schools fed into Clark High School and were zoned to Plano East Senior High until 2011-2012. In the 2011-2012 school year, Schimelpfenig students got to choose whether to go to Clark or Jasper High School. In the 2012-2013 school year, after school population debate, Schimelpfenig was zoned only to Clark High School.

== Courses ==
As of the 2026–2027 school year, Clark High School offers six AP courses: AP Human Geography, AP World History: Modern, AP Seminar, AP Precalculus, AP Spanish IV, and AP Computer Science Principles. Additionally, starting in the 2027–2028 school year, AP Seminar will award students an additional English II credit. If there are enough students registered for the course, Clark High School will offer AP Environmental Science, AP European History, or both. Furthermore, if a student has exhausted Clark High School's available math courses, they may take AP Calculus BC at Plano Senior High School. If they have completed AP Calculus BC, they may take multivariable calculus at Collin College online via dual credit.

Clark also offers on-level, honors, and extracurricular courses along with different athletic programs. Student-athletes may choose to play for the Plano Senior High School teams.

== School awards ==
- 1992–93 National Blue Ribbon School
