= Plano West Senior High School =

Public high school in Texas, US

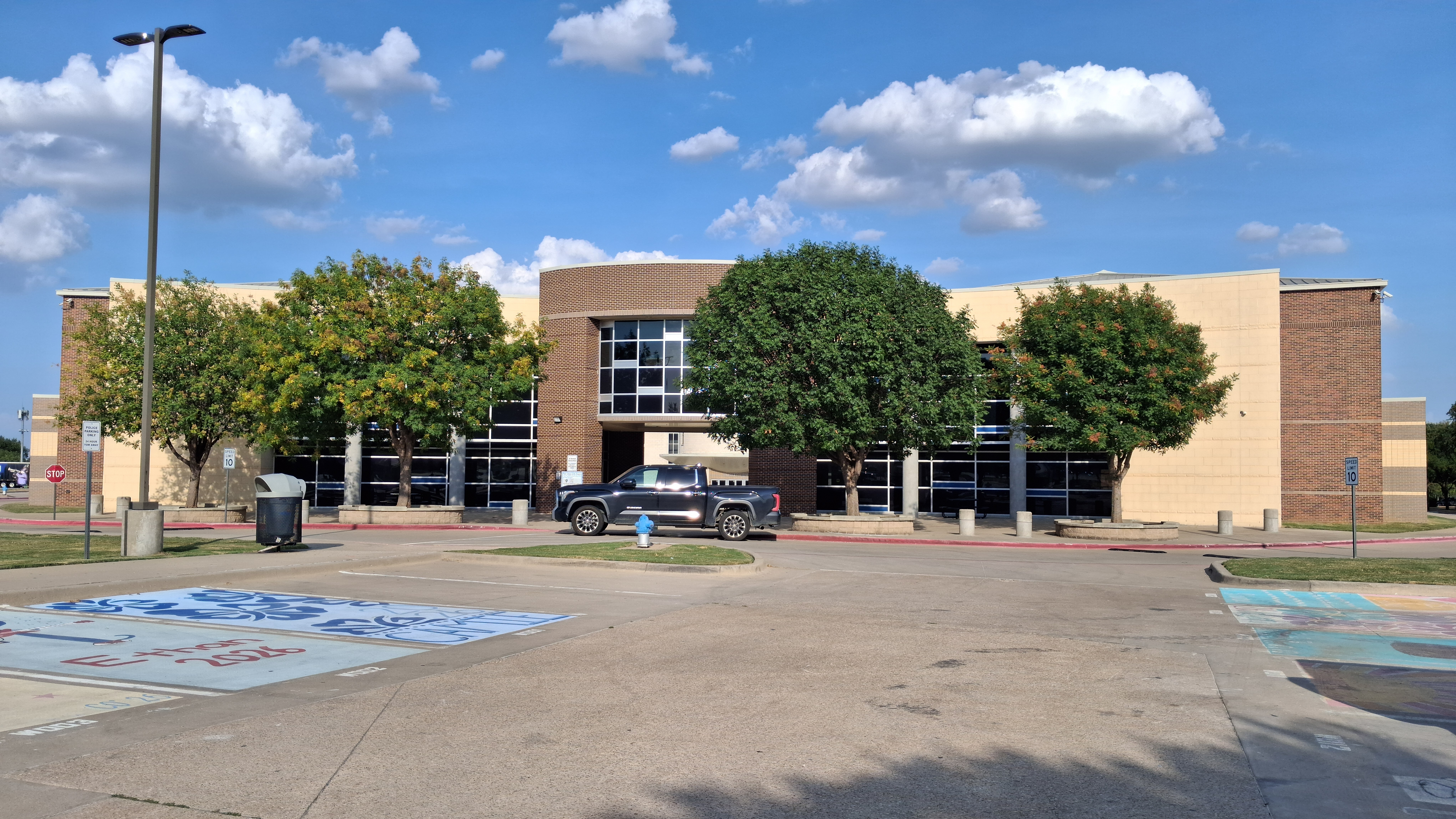

Location
- 3377 Willow Bend Drive; Plano, Texas 75093; United States; 33°02′37″N 96°48′48″W

Information
- Type: Public high school
- Motto: Leading With Pride
- Established: 1999; 27 years ago
- School district: Plano Independent School District
- Principal: Billie-Jean Lee
- Teaching staff: 146.69 (FTE)
- Grades: 11–12
- Enrollment: 2,618 (2023-2024)
- Student to teacher ratio: 17.85
- Campus: Suburban
- Colors: Royal blue Black; White
- Mascot: Wolf
- Rivals: Plano Senior High School, Plano East Senior High School
- Feeder schools: Jasper and Shepton
- Website: www.pisd.edu/pwsh

Plano West Senior High School (commonly known as West, Plano West, or PWSH) is a public high school in Plano, Texas serving high school juniors and seniors. Plano West is named after its geographic location within West Plano. The school is part of Plano Independent School District (PISD) and enrolls students based on the locations of students' homes, with junior high school (grades 9-10) feeder schools being Jasper and Shepton, both located west of Coit Road. Additionally, Plano West is physically adjacent to Renner Middle School.

The annual graduating class size typically ranges from 1300–1500 students. For the 2022-2023 school year, the enrollment totaled 1,304 juniors and 1,318 seniors. Plano West was established in the fall of 1999 on the campus of the newly renovated Shepton High School. Plano West is accredited by the Texas Education Agency, done through its accreditation of Plano ISD. The school colors are royal blue, black, and white, and the mascot is a wolf; the students refer to themselves as "the Wolf-Pack."

== History ==
Plano West Senior High School opened its doors for the 1999–2000 school year as the third Senior high school in the Plano Independent School District. Its opening foreshadowed the impending population boom in Collin County over the next several decades. The following year, Plano West began fielding full teams for varsity sports, cutting into the talent pipeline to rivals Plano Senior High School (PSHS) and Plano East Senior High School (PESH).

Plano West attracted national attention in the summer of 2003, when Plano West baseball player Taylor Hooton hanged himself. Hooton's suicide brought attention to teenage steroid use.

After a widely publicized and vitriolic battle, PISD in 2009 approved boundary changes that would potentially expand PWSH's enrollment from 2,000 to 3,400 students over 3 years, due to growth patterns in the area's middle schools, eventually making Plano West the largest in Texas. The plan was met with opposition from parents, as PWSH would have enrolled 44% of 11th and 12th graders in the school district. In the early 2010s, due to concerns about rising enrollment at PWSH compared to PSHS and PESH, the district considered options such as adding a fourth senior high school or spending $17 million to expand Plano West.

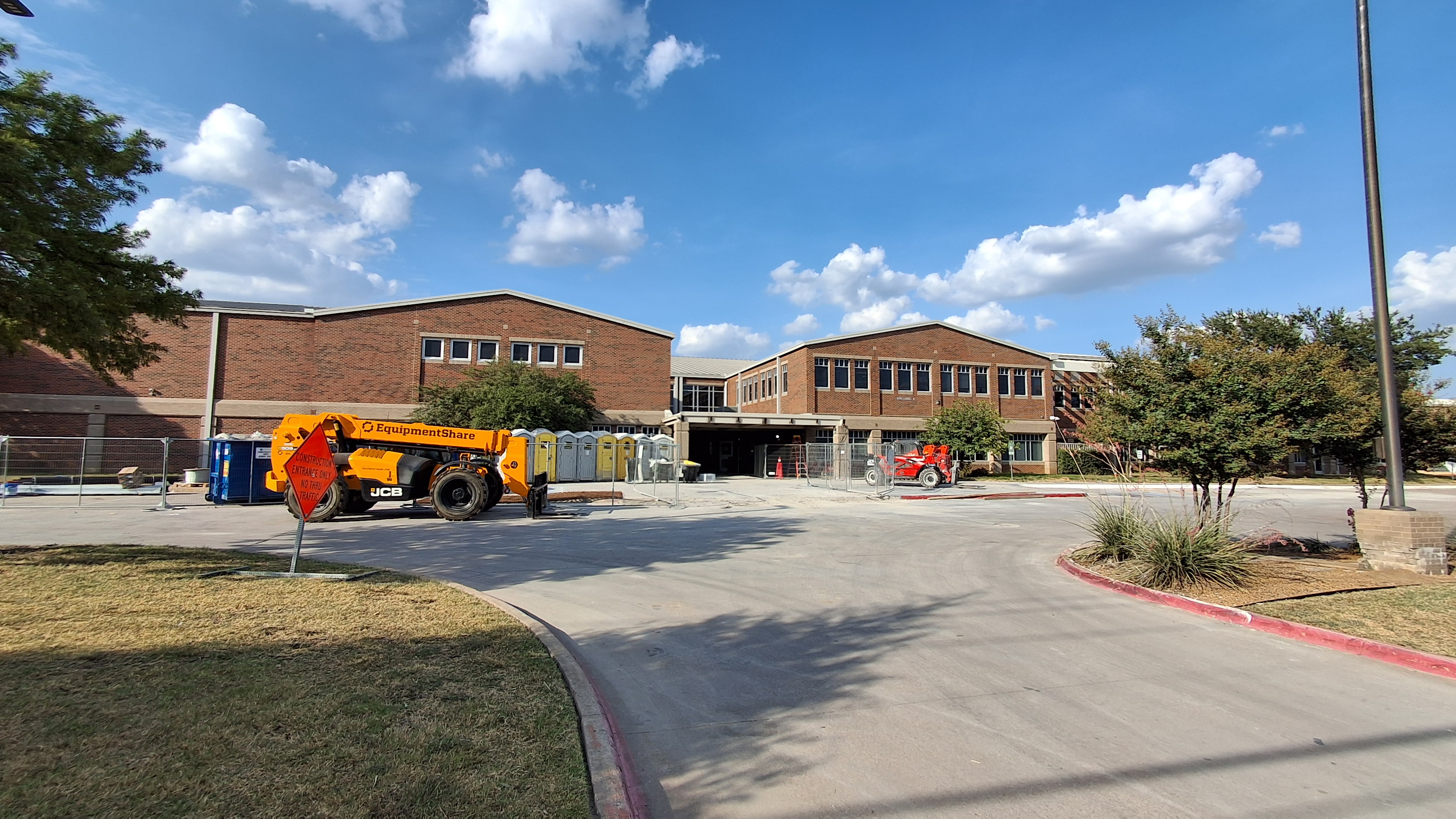
Recontruction view July 2026

In 2026, Plano West Senior High School renovations included a new structure for automotive classes, a two-story expansion of the gym, and a two-story addition to connect two buildings on campus, which will be completed in 2027.

== Academics ==
Plano West has a total enrollment of over 2,600 students and includes students in the eleventh and twelfth grades. After completing tenth grade at Jasper High School or Shepton High School, students matriculate to Plano West for the final two years of high school.

Newsweek ranked Plano West the 22nd best high school in the United States and the #1 comprehensive high school in Texas in 2016.

According to an analysis by PolarisList, Plano West sent the most graduates to MIT, Princeton, and Harvard of any public school in North Texas and the second-most of any public school in the state of Texas.

Plano West led the state with 77 National Merit Semifinalists in 2017, representing the top 1 percent of scores of high schoolers who took the PSAT.

In 2018, 1,223 Plano West students earned college credit through dual enrollment courses or by scoring high enough on Advanced Placement exams, the most of any school in Texas. The next highest was Allen High School, with 962 students earning college credit.

The class of 2023 had an average SAT score of 1166 out of 1600 and an average ACT score of 27.3.

== Student life ==
=== Athletics ===
Plano West's mascot is the Wolves, and its colors are blue, white, and black. Starting in the 2023–2024 school year, the mascot and colors were aligned with its feeder schools of Jasper and Shepton. Plano West fields 13 varsity teams, including baseball, basketball, cross country, football, golf, soccer, softball, swimming & diving, tennis, track & field, volleyball, wrestling, lacrosse, drill team, and cheerleading.

==== Tennis ====
The school is considered a team tennis powerhouse in Texas. The program has 18 state tournament championship appearances, winning five, the fourth most in UIL history. From the school's founding in 1999 until 2017, it won every district match it competed in, a total of 144 matches. Plano West won 20 consecutive district championships from 1999 to 2019.

Team Tennis State Championship Matches
Year	Winning Team		Losing Team		Location (all in Texas)	Class
2001	Plano West	10	El Paso Coronado	8	Lakeway World of Tennis, Austin	5A
2004	Plano West	10	Austin Westlake	5	Lakeway World of Tennis, Austin	5A
2005	Plano West	11	San Antonio Churchill	5	Lakeway World of Tennis, Austin	5A
2006	Plano West	11	Austin Westlake	6	Lakeway World of Tennis, Austin	5A
2016	Plano West	10	Houston Memorial	6	Texas A&M University, College Station	6A
2021	Plano West	10	Austin Lake Travis	3	Texas A&M University, College Station	6A

==== Football ====
The school's football team sent dozens of players to the NCAA Division I Football Bowl Subdivision, including David Lofton, Jordan Pugh, Kyle Bosworth, and Jackson Jeffcoat. In 2012, the football team advanced to the fourth round of the Texas high school playoffs, the furthest in school history. Plano West did not make the playoffs between 2014 and 2020, a period of time which included multiple winless seasons.

==== Boys Basketball ====
After beginning the 2014–2015 season ranked as the #5 boys' basketball team in the United States, Plano West won the 6A state basketball championship on a buzzer beater from D. J. Hogg. The team also included Division I recruit Tyler Davis.

Boys Basketball State Championship Games
Year	Winning Team		Losing Team		Location (all in Texas)	Class	Ref.
2015	Plano West	56	Clear Lake	54	Alamodome, San Antonio	6A	

==== Girls Basketball ====
The girls' basketball team became a state power during 14 seasons under founding coach Don Patterson, winning 364 games including the 2006 state championship. The team also advanced to the state semi-finals in 2014.

Girls Basketball State Championship Games
Year	Winning Team		Losing Team		Location	Class	Ref.
2006	Plano West	54	Rockwall	47	Frank Erwin Center, Austin	5A	

==== Championships ====
Girls Soccer State Championship Games
Year	Winning Team		Losing Team		Location (all in Texas)	Class
2000	Plano West	2	Katy Taylor	1	Round Rock ISD Stadium, Round Rock	5A
2001	Plano West	3	Katy Taylor	0	Round Rock ISD Stadium, Round Rock	5A
2002	Plano West	3	Humble Kingwood	0	Round Rock ISD Stadium, Round Rock	5A
2007	Plano West	3	Deer Park	0	Round Rock ISD Stadium, Round Rock	5A
2012	Plano West	1	Katy Seven Lakes	0	Birkelbach Field, Georgetown	5A
2013	Plano West	4	Southlake Carroll	1	Birkelbach Field, Georgetown	5A

Hockey State Championship Games
Year	Winning Team		Losing Team		Location (all in Texas)
2004	Plano West	2	Clear Lake High School	1	Deja Blue Arena, Frisco
2005	Plano West	1	Highland Park High School	0	Deja Blue Arena, Frisco
2007	Plano West	2	Allen High School	1 (OT)	Deja Blue Arena, Frisco
2011	Plano West	4	Southlake Carroll	2	Starscenter, Farmers Branch
2012	Plano West	4 (OT)	Arlington High School	3	Starscenter, Farmers Branch
2014	Plano West	6	Plano Senior	3	Starscenter, Farmers Branch

Baseball State Championship Games
Year	Winning Team		Losing Team		Location (all in Texas)	Class
2008	Plano West	10	Southlake Carroll	8	Dell Diamond, Round Rock	5A

Lacrosse State Championship Games
Year	Winning Team		Losing Team		Location (all in Texas)	Class
2005	Plano West	13	Plano East	12	Houston, TX	D2

=== Debate ===
The Plano West Debate Team's most recent win was at the National Speech and Debate Tournament in 2020, for the event Congressional Debate.

=== Music ===
The Plano West Chamber Orchestra is currently made up of 50 musicians. It won 1st place in the Texas Music Educators Association (TMEA) String Honor Orchestra competition (recognizing the top high school string orchestras in Texas) 5 consecutive times, in 2002, 2004, 2006, 2008, and 2010 (TMEA rules prohibit a school from entering the competition the year after it has won), along with several top-5 finishes from 2011 to 2015. The orchestra achieved the TMEA "String Honor Orchestra" designation again in 2016, 2019, and 2025. The Plano West Symphony Orchestra, composed of members of the Chamber Orchestra and the Wind Ensemble, also received the "Full Honor Orchestra" designation in 2018 and 2023. The orchestra has also been featured on the Disney Channel series "Totally in Tune" which aired in 2001. In 2005, the orchestra won a Cappie Award for Outstanding Pit Orchestra in a musical for the school production of Les Misérables.

The Choir Program performs at the annual Texas Music Educators Association Convention.

The Plano West Mighty Wolf Band has a marching and concert season and also has a winter guard program. In the 2009–2010 school year, the band had approximately 95 members; by 2015–2016, this had increased to about 195.

Plano West has taught a jazz band alongside its normal band program since the school's opening. In the 2018–2019 school year, due to increased membership, the school added a second jazz band. The Plano West Jazz Orchestra has been named a finalist for the Essentially Ellington High School Jazz Band Competition seven times: in 2017 and every year from 2020–2025. The Jazz Orchestra was the invited high school Jazz Ensemble at the 2016 Texas Music Educators Association Convention.

In 2011, Plano West was named one of only seven Gold Grammy Signature Schools for its music program. The award recognizes top U.S. public high schools making an outstanding commitment to music education.

=== Quiz Bowl ===
The Plano West A Quiz Bowl team won the 2018 High School National Championship Tournament, hosted by National Academic Quiz Tournaments.

== Notable alumni ==
- Ben Bass (Class of 2007) — NFL defensive end with the Dallas Cowboys and New England Patriots, formerly at Texas A&M University.
- Kyle Bosworth (Class of 2005) — NFL linebacker with the Jacksonville Jaguars and Dallas Cowboys
- Natalie Chou (Class of 2016) — NCAA shooting guard with the UCLA Bruins
- T. J. Cline (Class of 2012) — American-Israeli basketball player
- Geoffrey Groselle (Class of 2011) — professional basketball player.
- D. J. Hogg (Class of 2015) — professional basketball player
- Jackson Jeffcoat (Class of 2010) — NFL linebacker with the Washington Redskins, formerly defensive end at University of Texas at Austin. Currently with the Winnipeg Blue Bombers.
- David Lofton (Class of 2002) — NFL defensive back with the Miami Dolphins, formerly at Stanford University.
- Billy McKinney (Class of 2013) — MLB outfielder with the Los Angeles Dodgers
- Jordan Pugh (Class of 2006) — NFL defensive back with the New Orleans Saints. Drafted in the 6th round out of Texas A&M University.
- Tyson Sullivan (Class of 2004) — actor
- Leon Taylor (Class of 2011) — forward with Bodens BK and Tampa Bay Rowdies.
- Vickiel Vaughn (Class of 2002) — NFL defensive back with the Denver Broncos, formerly at the University of Arkansas.
- Titus Wall (Class of 2017) — CFL defensive back with the Calgary Stampeders

== See also ==
- Plano East Senior High School
- Plano Senior High School
- Shepton High School
- Jasper High School
