= Plano Independent School District =

School district in Texas, United States

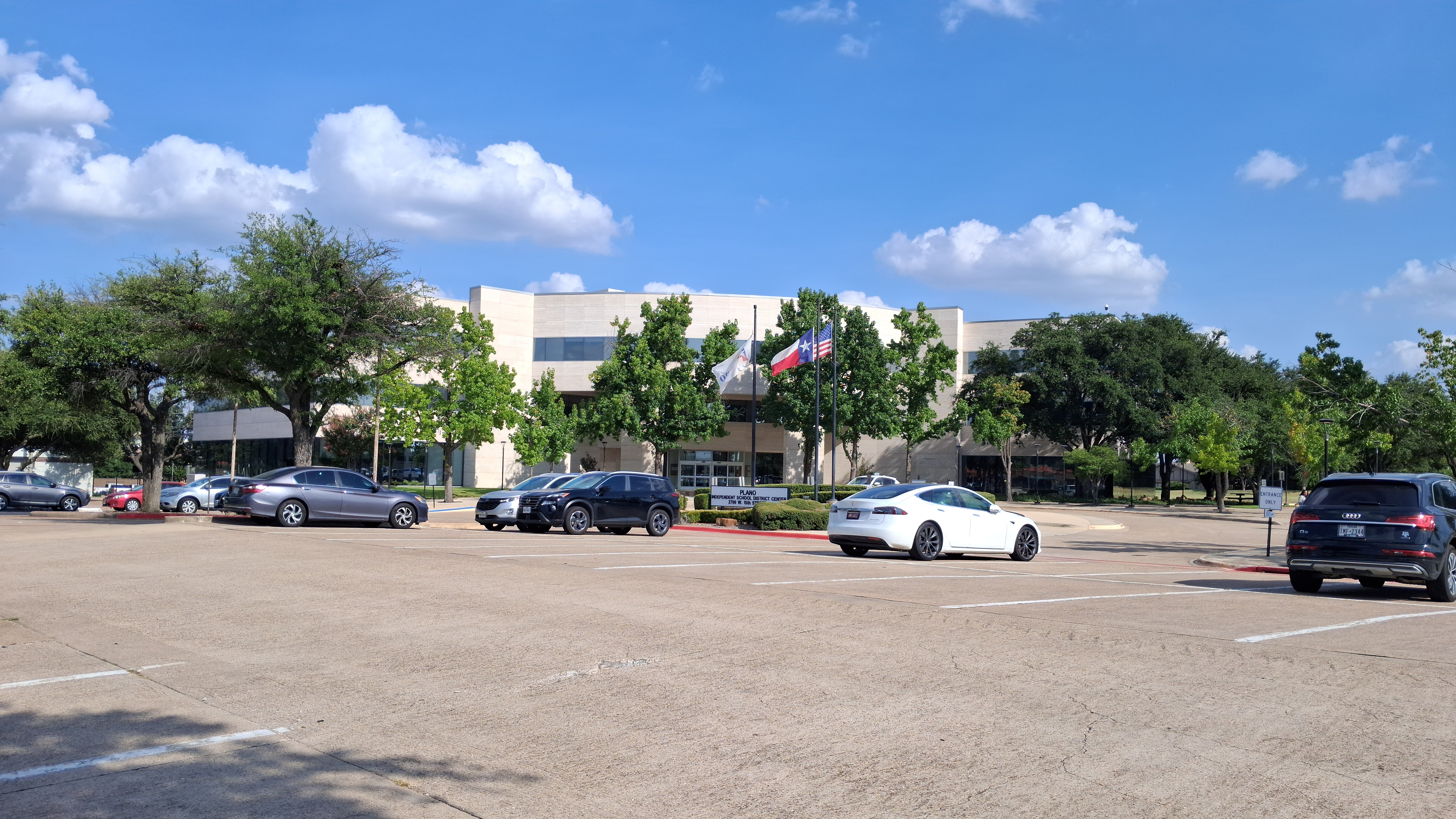

Address
- 2700 West 15th Street Plano, Collin County, Texas, 75075-7524; United States

District information
- Type: Independent school district
- Motto: Teamwork for Excellence
- Grades: PK-12
- Established: 1891 (135 years ago)
- Superintendent: Theresa Williams
- Asst. superintendent(s): Selenda Freeman, Johnny Hill, Lisa Wilson, Courtney Gober, Jed Reed, Patrick Tanner
- School board: Nancy Humphrey, Jeri Chambers, Lauren Tyra, Angela Powell, Tarrah Lantz, Michael Cook, Katherine Chan Goodwin
- Chair of the board: David Stolle
- Governing agency: Texas Education Agency
- Schools: 82
- Budget: US$707,660,000 (2015-2016)
- NCES District ID: 4835100

Students and staff
- Students: 46,612
- Teachers: 3,390.91 (on an FTE basis)
- Staff: 7,000
- Student–teacher ratio: 14:1

Other information
- Website: www.pisd.edu

Plano Independent School District (PISD or Plano ISD) is an independent school district in southwestern Collin County, Texas, United States, based in Plano.

PISD is the 18th largest school district in Texas and the 82nd largest in the United States. The school district serves over 50,000 students and employs approximately 3,800 faculty members spread across 73 schools and 2 special and 4 early education centers. PISD's operating budget was US$683.9 million as of 2021.

The district named Sara Bonser as Interim Superintendent in November 2017. On March 6, 2018, Bonser became Superintendent of Plano ISD, becoming the first woman to hold the title of superintendent for the district. She retired in early 2022. Theresa Williams was voted in as superintendent in early 2022.

In 2010, the school district was rated "recognized" by the Texas Education Agency.

Plano ISD serves about 100 square miles (260 km^{2}) of land, with 66 square miles (170 km^{2}) of it within the City of Plano. The district also takes students from northern portions of Dallas, Richardson, Allen, Carrollton, Garland, Lucas, Murphy, Parker, and Wylie.

There are two areas in North Dallas that are in Plano ISD, both in Collin County: one that is east of Midway Road, south of the George Bush Turnpike, and west of Waterview Parkway; and a group of apartments around Horizon North Parkway. These areas, annexed into the City of Dallas after 1960, are generally high-income.

== Educational structure ==
Plano ISD's educational structure differs from the typical U.S. educational pattern. Primary education in PISD, following the typical U.S. structure, consists of 44 elementary schools that serve the kindergarten through fifth grades. However, PISD's system of secondary education consists of 13 middle schools that serve the sixth through eighth grades, 6 'high schools' that serve the ninth and tenth grades, and 3 'senior high schools' that serve the eleventh and twelfth grades. The 'high school' and 'senior high school' system is a departure from the standard U.S. high school that serves the ninth through twelfth grades.

PISD students attend schools based primarily on the geographic location of their homes. Schools of a lower level feed into specific schools at the next highest level. The three exceptions to the feeder system is for students wishing to participate in the International Baccalaureate program, the Health Sciences Academy, or the STEAM Academy. Parents of students may also request transfers out of their students' assigned schools for various reasons (such as to take classes unique to a particular school).

This system leads to very large graduating classes and overall student populations. At Plano Senior High School, Plano East Senior High School, and Plano West Senior High School, the current student populations are listed as 2,567, 2,795, and 2,160 students, respectively. Each year's graduating class is approximately half of each number. Previous years' Graduation Commencement Ceremonies have taken place at Ford Center and the Dallas Convention Center.

=== Board of trustees ===
The Board of Trustees includes seven at-large elected members that oversee the district. Elections are held in May in odd-numbered years for either three or four candidates. An election was held in May 2019, for seats 4, 5, 7 and the remaining two years for seat 6. The board elects a president, vice president and secretary.

== Academics and Honors ==
All three of PISD's senior high schools were recently listed in the top 250 of Newsweek's list of 1000 top high schools in America. In the 2012 list, Plano West Senior High School was ranked as 63rd in the country, Plano Senior High School was ranked 108th, and Plano East Senior High School was ranked 243rd. In 2011, Plano West Senior High had been ranked 98 on Newsweek's "America's Best High Schools," and Plano East Senior High had been ranked 461.

Plano ISD opened three academies (4-year high schools) in the 2013–2014 school year. The first "Academy High School", a STEAM, project based, high school that serves grades 9–12.

The second magnet focuses on Health science, and is housed at Williams High School for grades 9–10, and will continue at Plano East Senior High School for grades 11–12.

Additionally, the district has modified its existing International Baccalaureate program so that all four grades will be housed at Plano East Senior High as a "school within a school".

The mean SAT score (math plus reading) for the district is 1152 out of 1600, and the mean ACT (test) composite score is 25.7, with 83.5% of district students taking the SAT or ACT. 43.4% of district students take AP or IB courses, and 84.3% of those students pass their AP or IB exam(s). Plano ISD offers all AP courses except AP Italian Language and Culture and AP Japanese Language and Culture to students.

In the 2012–2013 school year, Plano ISD had 128 students named National Merit Semifinalists, more than any other Texas school district. Also in the 2012–2013 school year, ten PISD students were named semifinalists in the Siemens Competition, and two were named as finalists. In the state of Texas, a total of thirty eight and eleven students, respectively, captured those honors in the Siemens competition. In the 2011–2012 school year, 76 students were selected as All-state musicians.

== Demographics ==
Plano ISD ethnicity data 2018–2019
Ethnicity	Percent
White	33.6%
Asian	24.1%
Hispanic	25.3%
African American	12.6%
American Indian	0.3%
Pacific Islander	0.1%
Two or more races	4.0%

In the 1990s, Plano ISD received many non-Hispanic white families leaving urban areas. However, this changed in the period from 1997 to 2015, as the number of non-Hispanic white children in Plano ISD declined by 10,000.

== Bilingual programs ==
In 1991 Plano ISD began a Chinese bilingual program for preschool and kindergarten students developed by Donna Lam. It is one of two Chinese bilingual programs in the State of Texas, along with the one established by the Austin Independent School District. It was established after Chinese professionals began to settle Plano.

== Controversies ==
On the December 9, 2005, edition of The O'Reilly Factor, as part of his "War on Christmas" segment, news commentator, Bill O'Reilly falsely claimed that the district had banned students from wearing red and green clothing "because they were Christmas colors." An attorney from the school district requested a retraction. O'Reilly later retracted his allegation on 20 December. He had mistakenly included clothing among the items banned by PISD, while the ongoing lawsuit against the district only alleges the banning of the distribution of written religious materials.

That lawsuit was originally filed against PISD on December 15, 2004 (Jonathan Morgan, et al., v. the Plano Independent School District, et al.). On December 16, 2004, prior to the school "winter parties, Judge Paul Brown of the US District Court for the Eastern District of Texas issued a temporary restraining order, requiring PISD to lift these restrictions. The Morgan, et al., v. Plano Independent School District (PISD) case began in 2003, with school officials even banning students from using red and green napkins and paper plates to a school-sponsored "holiday" party.

In another more serious legal dispute, Plano ISD was found to have violated First Amendment rights of parents during public meetings about the implementation of a controversial new math curriculum, "Connected Math". During several years of appeals by PISD, the ruling was consistently upheld at all levels, including the 5th U.S. Circuit Court of Appeals (in July 2003). The district briefly considered an appeal to the United States Supreme Court, but instead reached a settlement of US$400,000. This was a settlement of the judgment, not the ruling of a First Amendment rights violation by the district.

The most recent Federal lawsuit against PISD was filed in March 2006, by a religious group, Students Witnessing Absolute Truth (SWAT), alleging religious discrimination. In a Decision of the US District Court granting a preliminary injunction against Plano ISD, the judge said, "The issue in this case is not one of sponsorship or the lack thereof, but of the flagrant denial for equal access guaranteed to S.W.A.T. ... The harm at issue is irreparable because it inhibits the exercise of Plaintiff's First Amendment freedoms of speech and religion." On April 26, 2006, Plano ISD offered, and SWAT accepted, an Offer of Settlement, which included the district's promise to change its discriminatory policy.

In November 2010, following a complaint by the parents of a student, the Plano ISD textbook board decided to remove the textbook Culture and Values: A Survey of the Humanities: Alternative Volume, from its Humanities curriculum because the illustrations of works of art included nudity and various sex acts. After a public outcry, the decision was reversed within days.

On March 2, 2021, PISD became the subject of criticism due to its response to the racially motivated assault of an eighth-grade student of Haggard Middle School at the hands of his classmates during a "non-school-related, off-campus" event. The victim stated that he was forced to drink urine and shot at with a BB gun, while social media posts alleged racist and homophobic abuse.

On February 18, 2022, a walkout was staged at Plano East Senior High School, protesting the administrative conduct of the school in an incident involving sexual harassment. No incidents were reported during the demonstration, and PISD officials have not yet acknowledged the incident.

== List of schools ==
Each household in Plano ISD is zoned to an elementary school, a middle school, a high school, and a senior high school. High schools serve grades 9–10 while senior high schools serve grades 11–12; however, any 9th or 10th grader may participate in extracurricular sports at the senior high level. There are 67 schools: 42 elementary schools, 11 middle schools, six high schools, three senior high schools, and one alternative STEM-based high school, Plano ISD Academy High School. Out of the 67 schools, 55 are located within the city of Plano. There are four schools in both Murphy and Richardson, three in North Dallas, and one in Allen.

High schools (Grades 9-12)
School Name	Location	Grade Level	Year Opened	Additional Information
C. A. McMillen High School	Murphy	9-10	2011	
Plano East Senior High School	Plano	11-12	1981	Plano East Senior High School offered the IB Diploma Programme since 1995. Starting in the 2013—2014 school year, the program expanded to freshmen and sophomores a preparatory program for the IB Diploma Programme (International Honors Preparatory Program).
Plano Senior High School	Plano	11-12	1892	
Plano West Senior High School	Plano	11-12	1999	
R. C. Clark High School	Plano	9-10	1979	
Shepton High School	Plano	9-10	1984	
T. C. Jasper High School	Plano	9-10	1996	
T. H. Williams High School	Plano	9-10	1961	
W. A. Vines High School	Plano	9-10	1976	

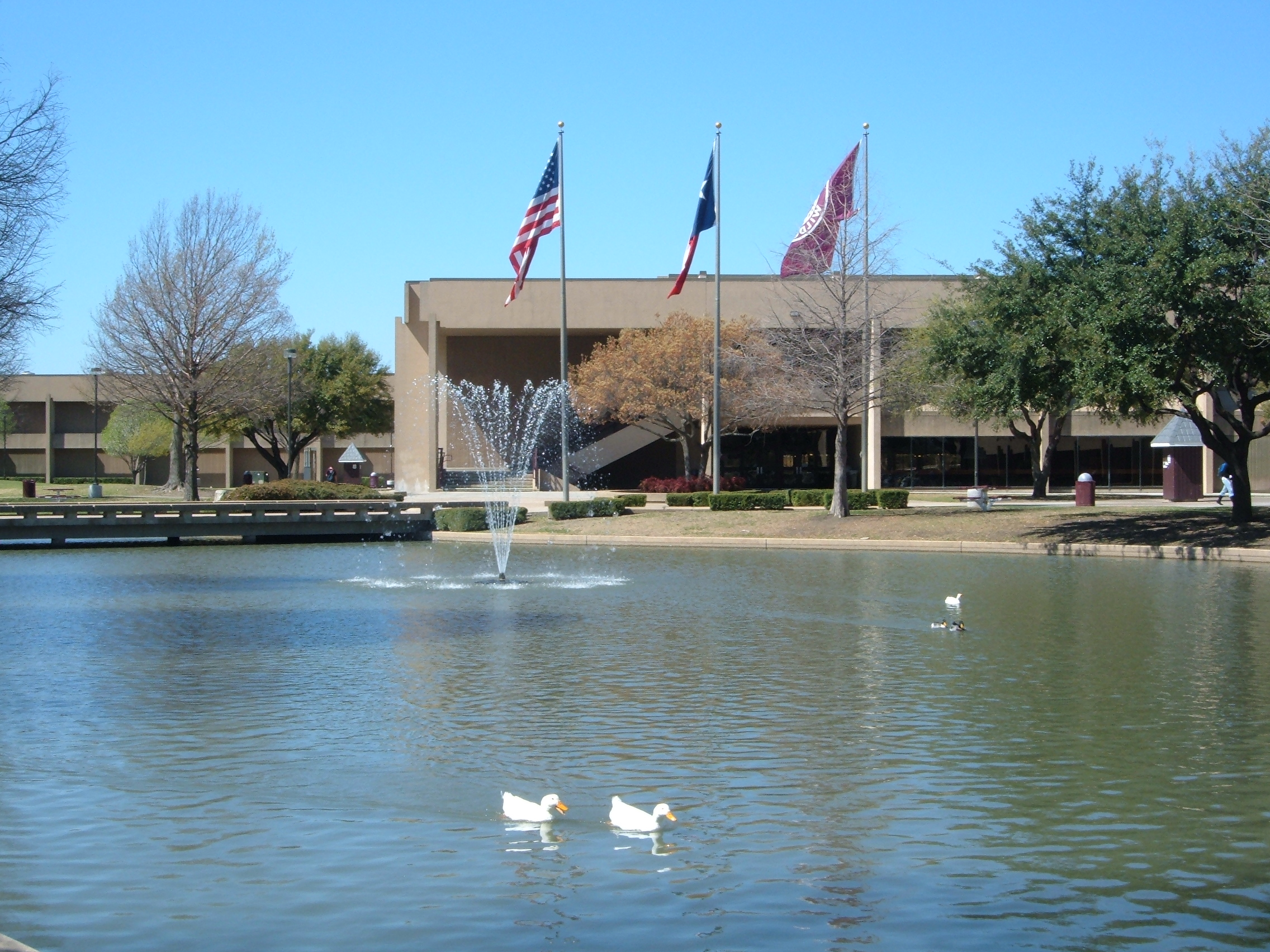
Plano Senior High School

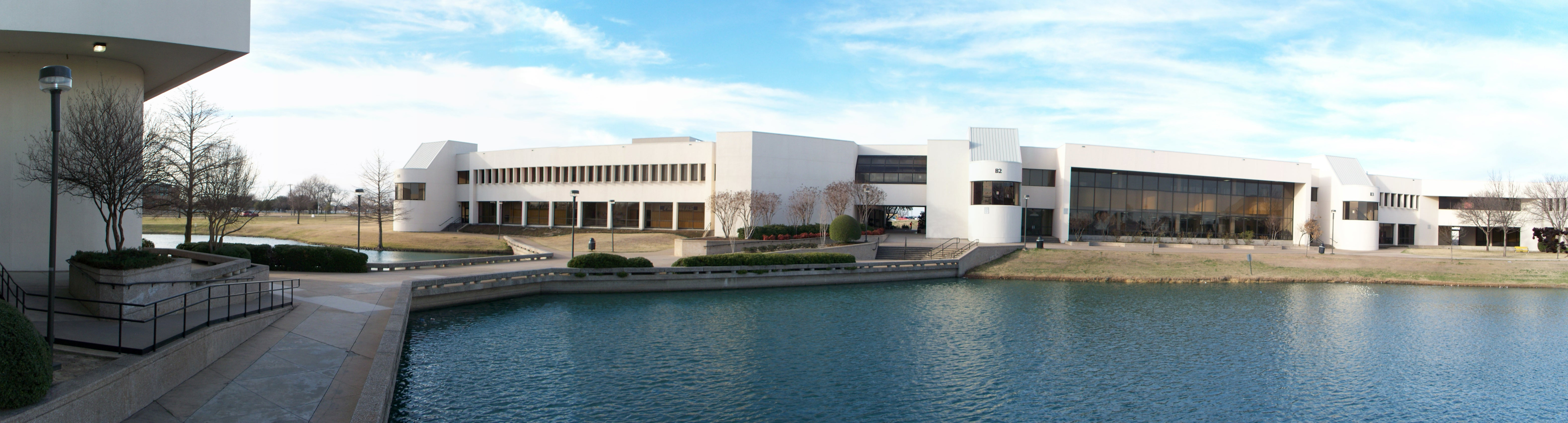
Plano East Senior High School

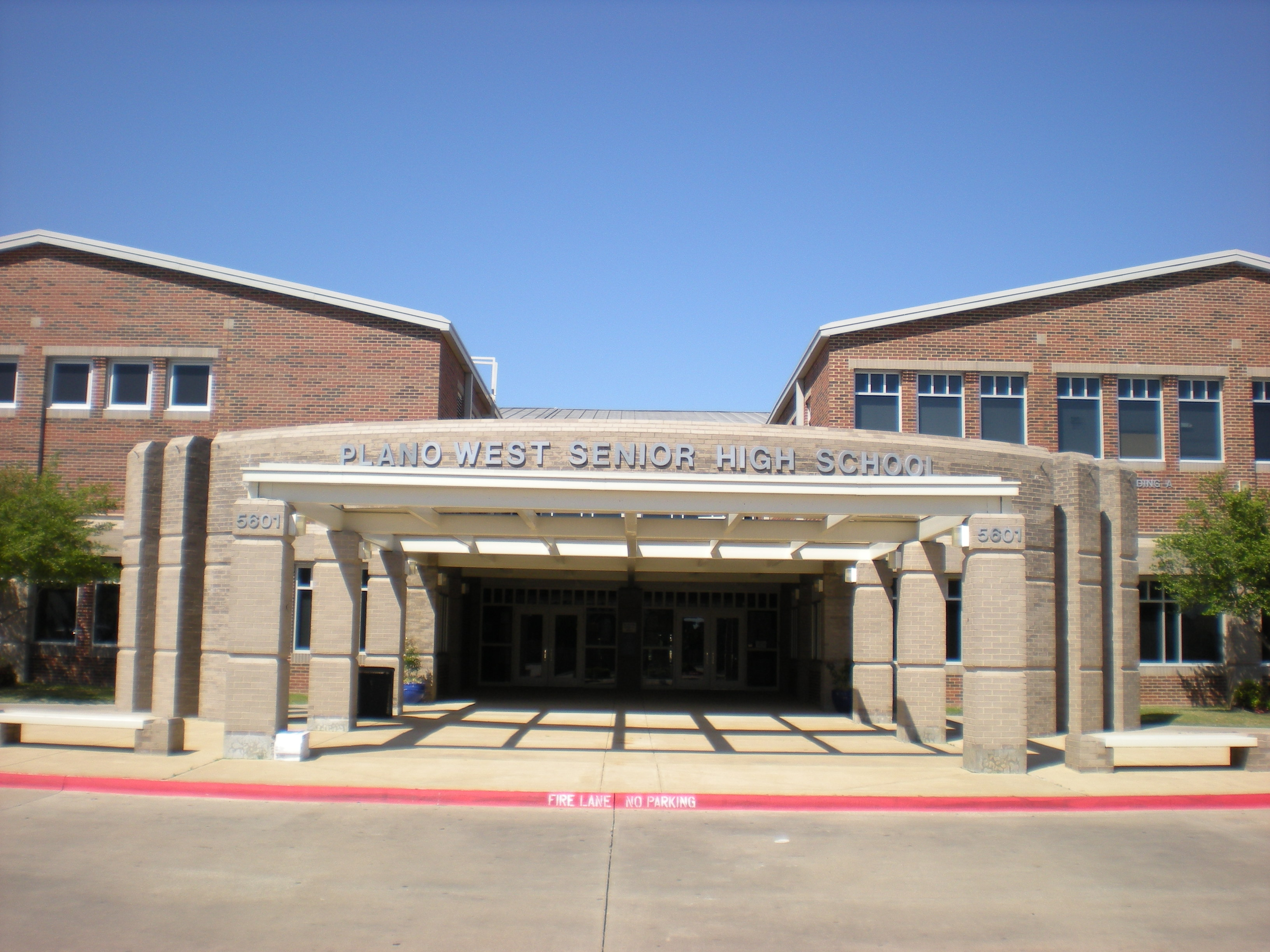
Plano West Senior High School

Middle Schools (Grades 6-8)
School Name	Location	Year Opened	Additional Information
Bowman Middle School	Plano	1968	
Frankford Middle School	Dallas	1998	
Haggard Middle School	Plano	1974	1999–2000 National Blue Ribbon School
Hendrick Middle School	Plano	1987	
Murphy Middle School	Murphy	2003	
Otto Middle School	Plano	2010	
Renner Middle School	Plano	1998	1994–96 National Blue Ribbon School
Rice Middle School	Plano	1999	
Robinson Middle School	Plano	1994	
Schimelpfenig Middle School	Plano	1980	1988–89 National Blue Ribbon School
Wilson Middle School	Plano	1970	1988–89 National Blue Ribbon School

Elementary Schools (Grades K-5)
School Name	Location	Year Opened	Additional Information
Aldridge Elementary School	Richardson	1968	
Andrews Elementary School	Plano	2002	
Barksdale Elementary School	Plano	1996	
Barron Elementary School	Plano	1971	
Bethany Elementary School	Plano	1993	
Beverly Elementary School	Allen	1998	2006 National Blue Ribbon School
Boggess Elementary School	Murphy	2002	
Brinker Elementary School	Plano	1988	1996–97 National Blue Ribbon School
Carlisle Elementary School	Plano	1984	1987–88 National Blue Ribbon School
Centennial Elementary School	Plano	1999	
Christie Elementary School	Plano	1973	1998–99 National Blue Ribbon School
Daffron Elementary School	Plano	1990	
Dooley Elementary School	Plano	1981	1989–90 National Blue Ribbon School
Gulledge Elementary School	Plano	1995	
Harrington Elementary School	Plano	1978	
Haun Elementary School	Plano	1997	
Hedgcoxe Elementary School	Plano	1990	1993–94 National Blue Ribbon School
Hickey Elementary School	Plano	2002	
Hightower Elementary School	Plano	1998	
Huffman Elementary School	Plano	1984	1991–92 National Blue Ribbon School. Huffman Elementary offered the IB Primary Years Programme since the 2019-2020 school year.
Hughston Elementary School	Plano	1975	
Hunt Elementary School	Murphy	2005	
Jackson Elementary School	Plano	1975	
Mathews Elementary School	Plano	1987	2000–01 National Blue Ribbon School and 2005
McCall Elementary School	Plano	2005	
Meadows Elementary School	Plano	1963	1996–97 National Blue Ribbon School
Memorial Elementary School	Plano	1967	
Mendenhall Elementary School	Plano	1952	
Miller Elementary School	Richardson	1995	
Mitchell Elementary School	Dallas	1992	
Rasor Elementary School	Plano	1992	
Rose Haggar Elementary School	Dallas	1995	
Saigling Elementary School	Plano	1977	1991–92 National Blue Ribbon School and 2005
Schell Elementary School	Richardson	2007	
Shepard Elementary School	Plano	1971	1991–92 and 2008 National Blue Ribbon School
Sigler Elementary School	Plano	1963	
Skaggs Elementary School	Plano	1996	2006 National Blue Ribbon School
Stinson Elementary School	Richardson	2000	
Thomas Elementary School	Plano	1978	
Weatherford Elementary School	Plano	1974	
Wells Elementary School	Plano	1978	1991–92 National Blue Ribbon School and 2007
Wyatt Elementary School	Plano	2000	

Academy Programs (Grades K-12)
Academy Name	Year Opened	Information
Academy High School	2013	9-12 STEAM (Science, Technology, Engineering, Arts and Math)
Health Science Academy		location with Plano East Senior High School. Four-year program for careers in healthcare.
Huffman IB World School	1984	IB Primary Years Programme
IB World School	July 1, 1995	International Honors in 9-10 to IB Diploma Programme in 11-12 location with Plano East Senior High School
Industries Academy	1984	
Wildcat Collegiate Academy		Partnership with Collin College pathway to college success career.

Early Childhood Schools (Pre-K)
School Name	Year Opened	Additional Information
Head Star	1965	Government-funded educational program to teach preschoolers from low-income families.
Beaty Early Childhood School	2002	
Isaacs Early Childhood School	2009	
Pearson Early Childhood School	2002	

Alternative Campuses
Center Name	Year Opened	Information
Charmaine Solomon Adult Transition Center	2016	Special Education age 18-22 for Post-secondary education, Vocational training, Integrated employment, continuing and adult education, Independent living, and Community participation.
Guinn Special Programs Center	1995	Academic Integrity, Responsible Decision-Making, Self-Awareness and Management, Social Awareness and Relationship Skills
Holifield Science Center		
Plano ISD Career & Technical Education Center	2026	

=== Former schools ===
Middle School (Grade 6-8)
School Name	Year Opened	Year Closed	Additional Information
Armstrong Middle School	1976	2024	1992–93 National Blue Ribbon School. Decline enrollment.
Carpenter Middle School	1978	2024	1992–93 National Blue Ribbon School. Decline enrollment.

Elementary schools (grades K-5)
School Name	Year Opened	Year Closed	Additional Information
Davis Elementary School	1972	2024	1993–94 National Blue Ribbon School. Decline enrollment.
Forman Elementary School	1971	2024	1993–94 National Blue Ribbon School. Plans to new location Fire Station 3

Early childhood schools (PreK)
School Name	Year Opened	Year Closed	Additional Information
Jupiter Center		2017	Jupiter Center closed due to mold issues.

== Feeder schools chart ==
- 3-5 elementary schools feed into a middle school
  - Note that Bowman Middle School takes students from 6 elementary schools.
- 2 middle schools feed into a high school
  - Note that Bowman Middle School solely feeds into Williams High School.
- 2 high schools feed into a senior high school

The district has had its feeder-school boundary lines redrawn at times in the recent past,

In 2009, the development of more schools in Plano's eastern region, as well as more students attending them, reignited a boundary-line debate. Certain issues, such as socio-economic integration and ethnic balance in the schools, became points of intense discussion that became very publicized and heated. Distance from McMillen and Williams also caused debate against the socioeconomic balance. Eventually, it was settled with mixed socioeconomic and ethnic balance between the two high schools. The following year, the School Board settled the debate so as to affect feeder schools going into Plano West: due to the high student populations of Plano and Plano East as compared to the lower population of Plano West, two of the most populated high schools were approved to feed into Plano West, and Schimelpfenig Middle School students could choose between two tracks, leading either to Plano Senior or Plano West. However, this prompted some parents to be concerned about possible future overcrowding at Plano West. In 2011, the School Board agreed to tweak their plan to ease worries about Plano West overcrowding: Schimelpfenig Middle School students would not be allowed to choose tracks, but instead would all go to Clark High and then Plano Senior High, with the option to transfer.

In 2016, the enrollment boundaries for Mendenhall, Aldridge, and Brinker Elementary Schools were redrawn so as to allow smoother transitions into their appropriate feeder schools.

In the summer 2025, Davis and Forman Elementary Schools and Armstrong and Carpenter Middle Schools closed prompting new boundaries. The students of Plano Regional Day School Program for the Deaf at Davis Elementary had to shift to Harrington Elementary School.

Elementary	Middle	High	Senior high
Beverly	Hendrick	Clark	Plano
Hedgcoxe	Hendrick	Clark	Plano
Rasor	Hendrick	Clark	Plano
Thomas	Hendrick	Clark	Plano
Bethany	Schimelpfenig	Clark	Plano
Carlisle	Schimelpfenig	Clark	Plano
Christie	Schimelpfenig	Clark	Plano
Mathews	Schimelpfenig	Clark	Plano
Harrington	Haggard	Vines	Plano
Hughston	Haggard	Vines	Plano
Saigling	Haggard	Vines	Plano
Wells	Haggard	Vines	Plano
Aldridge	Wilson	Vines	Plano
Jackson (east of Coit)	Wilson	Vines	Plano
Shepard	Wilson	Vines	Plano
Sigler	Wilson	Vines	Plano
Weatherford	Wilson	Vines	Plano
Boggess	Murphy	McMillen	Plano East
Hunt	Murphy	McMillen	Plano East
Miller	Murphy	McMillen	Plano East
Mendenhall	Otto	McMillen	Plano East
Schell	Otto	McMillen	Plano East
Stinson	Otto	McMillen	Plano East
Barron	Bowman	Williams	Plano East
Dooley	Bowman	Williams	Plano East
Hickey	Bowman	Williams	Plano East
McCall	Bowman	Williams	Plano East
Meadows	Bowman	Williams	Plano East
Memorial	Bowman	Williams	Plano East
Andrews	Rice	Jasper	Plano West
Skaggs	Rice	Jasper	Plano West
Wyatt	Rice	Jasper	Plano West
Daffron	Robinson	Jasper	Plano West
Gulledge	Robinson	Jasper	Plano West
Haun	Robinson	Jasper	Plano West
Barksdale	Renner	Shepton	Plano West
Brinker	Renner	Shepton	Plano West
Centennial	Renner	Shepton	Plano West
Huffman	Renner	Shepton	Plano West
Hightower	Frankford	Shepton	Plano West
Jackson (west of Coit)	Frankford	Shepton	Plano West
Mitchell	Frankford	Shepton	Plano West
Rose Haggar	Frankford	Shepton	Plano West

== See also ==
- List of school districts in Texas
