= Vines High School =

Public school in Texas, United States

W.A. Vines High School
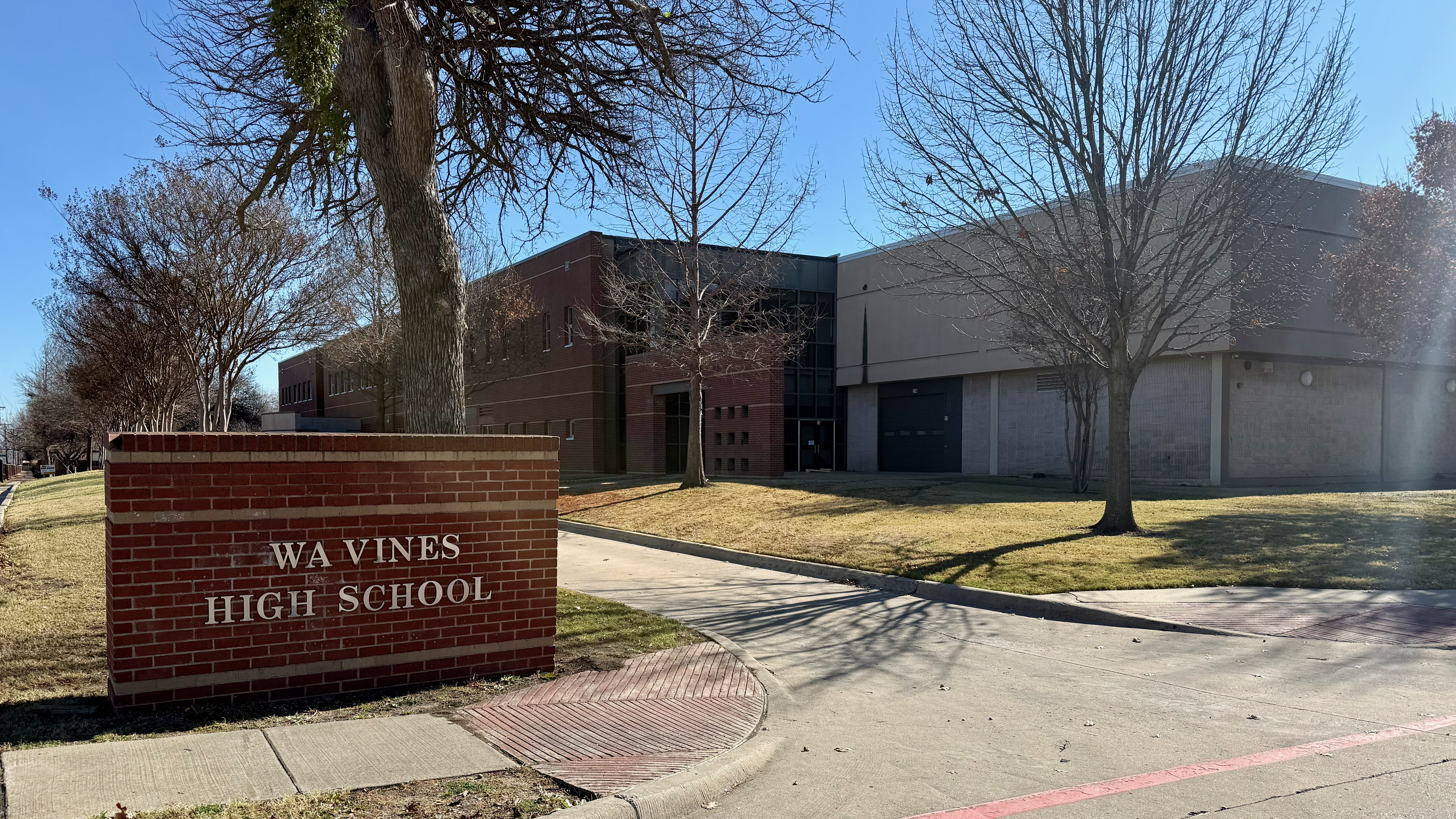

Location
- 1401 Highedge Drive; Plano, Texas 75075; United States; 33.017934°N 96.743766°W

Information
- School type: Free public
- Motto: Valor Honor Scholarship
- Established: 1976
- School district: Plano Independent School District
- NCES District ID: 4835100
- CEEB code: 445567
- NCES School ID: 483510003974
- Principal: Nemisha Bhakta
- Teaching staff: 58.49 (on an FTE basis)
- Grades: 9th and 10th
- Enrollment: 984 (2023–2024)
- Average class size: 20-30
- Student to teacher ratio: 16.82
- Campus: Suburban
- Colors: Maroon and white
- Fight song: University of Texas Fight Song
- Mascot: Wildcats
- Website: vines.pisd.edu

W. A. Vines High School (commonly Vines or VHS) is a free co-educational secondary school in Plano, Texas, United States, serving grades nine and ten. Wilson and Haggard middle schools feed into Vines. Founded in 1976, the school is part of the Plano Independent School District, which is accredited by the Texas Education Agency. The school colors are maroon and white, and the school mascot is the Wildcat. Vines is one of six high schools in PISD, and is one of two that feed into Plano Senior High School.

== History ==
Vines High School opened in 1976 and was built on the former farmland of William Asa Vines for $3.3 million.

=== Mascot and colors ===
For 46 years Vines High School's mascot was "The Viking" and its school colors were purple and white. The school's drill team performed as "The Vikettes". Beginning in the 2023-24 school year the Plano Independent School District initiated an effort to unify 9th and 10th grade high schools with their senior high counterparts. The overall goals of the initiative included improving student engagement, amplifying school pride, and simplifying overall extracurricular administration. Accordingly, Vines High School's mascot was changed to the Wildcat and the school colors were changed to maroon and white in order to align with its senior high school counterpart Plano Senior High School.

== Academics ==
Vines now offers four Advanced Placement (AP) classes: Human Geography, European History, Principles of Computer Science, and World History.

== Wildcat Collegiate Academy ==
Starting with the 2024-2025 school year, Vines began offering a collegiate academy in partnership with Collin College. Students who are in this program become Collin College students, and receive an associate's degree along with their high school diploma after four years. They spend their 9th and 10th grade years at Vines, and their 11th and 12th grade years at Plano Senior High School.
