= AP Human Geography =

Advanced Placement course and exam

Logo of AP Human Geography as of 2025

Advanced Placement (AP) Human Geography (also known as AP Human Geo, APHG, HGAP, APHuG, or AP Human) is an Advanced Placement social studies course in human geography for high school (usually freshman) students in the US, culminating in an exam administered by the College Board. It is designed to be equivalent to a one-semester college course in human geography.

The course introduces students to the systematic study of patterns and processes that have shaped human understanding, use, and alteration of Earth's surface. Students employ spatial concepts and landscape analyses to analyze human social organization and its environmental consequences while also learning about the methods and tools geographers use in their science and practice.

== Exam ==
The AP Human Geography Exam consists of two sections. The first section consists of 60 multiple choice (MCQ) questions and the second section consists of 3 free-response (FRQ) questions, the first with no stimulus, the second with one stimulus, and the third with two stimuli. To receive full points, students must interpret the stimuli, if included with the question. Common stimuli are data, images, or maps. The sections are 60 and 75 minutes long, respectively. It is not necessary to answer the free-response (FRQ) questions in essay form; instead, points are awarded for keywords, examples, and other responses. As of May 2025, the AP Human Geography Exam will be online.

== Curriculum and course outline ==
The curriculum consists of informational book-related homework, which often requires students to strive to learn information independently. The curriculum teaches about diffusion, human traits, religion, and population clusters.

The topics covered by the exam are as follows:

Topic	Percent
Thinking Geographically	8-10%
Population and Migration Patterns and Processes	12-17%
Cultural Patterns and Processes	12-17%
Political Patterns and Processes	12-17%
Agriculture and Rural Land-Use Patterns and Processes	12-17%
Cities and Urban Land-Use Patterns and Processes	12-17%
Industrial and Economic Development Patterns and Processes	12-17%

=== Course Outline ===
Unit 1 - Thinking Geographically
Topic Number	Topic
1.1	Introduction to Maps
1.2	Geographic Data
1.3	The Power of Geographic Data
1.4	Spatial Concepts
1.5	Human-Environmental Interaction
1.6	Scales of Analysis
1.7	Regional Analysis

Unit 2 - Population and Migration Patterns and Processes
Topic Number	Topic Description
2.1	Population Distribution
2.2	Consequences of Population Distribution
2.3	Population Composition
2.4	Population Dynamics
2.5	The Demographic Transition Model
2.6	Malthusian Theory
2.7	Population Policies
2.8	Women and Demographic Change
2.9	Aging Populations
2.10	Causes of Migration
2.11	Forced and Voluntary Migration
2.12	Effects of Migration

Unit 3 - Cultural Patterns and Processes
Topic Number	Topic Description
3.1	Introduction to Culture
3.2	Cultural Landscapes
3.3	Cultural Patterns
3.4	Types of Diffusion
3.5	Historical Causes of Diffusion
3.6	Contemporary Causes of Diffusion
3.7	Diffusion of Religion and Language
3.8	Effects of Diffusion

Unit 4 - Political Patterns and Processes
Topic Number	Topic Description
4.1	Introduction to Political Geography
4.2	Political Processes
4.3	Political Power and Territoriality
4.4	Defining Political Boundaries
4.5	The Function of Political Boundaries
4.6	Internal Boundaries
4.7	Forms of Governance
4.8	Defining Devolutionary Factors
4.9	Challenges to Sovereignty
4.10	Consequences of Centrifugal and Centripetal Forces

Unit 5 - Agriculture and Rural Land Use Patterns and Processes
Topic Number	Topic Description
5.1	Introduction to Agriculture
5.2	Settlement Patterns and Survey Methods
5.3	Agricultural Origins and Diffusions
5.4	The Second Agricultural Revolution
5.5	The Green Revolution
5.6	Agricultural Production Regions
5.7	Spatial Organization of Agriculture
5.8	Von Thünen Model
5.9	The Global System of Agriculture
5.10	Consequences of Agricultural Practices
5.11	Challenges of Contemporary Agriculture
5.12	Women in Agriculture

Unit 6 - Cities and Urban Land Use Patterns and Processes
Topic Number	Topic Description
6.1	The Origin and Influences of Urbanization
6.2	Cities Across the World
6.3	Cities and Globalization
6.4	The Size and Distribution of Cities
6.5	The Internal Structure of Cities
6.6	Density and Land Use
6.7	Infrastructure
6.8	Urban Sustainability
6.9	Urban Data
6.10	Challenges of Urban Changes
6.11	Challenges of Urban Sustainability

Unit 7 - Industrial and Economic Development Patterns and Processes
Topic Number	Topic Description
7.1	The Industrial Revolution
7.2	Economic Sectors and Patterns
7.3	Measures of Development
7.4	Women and Economic Development
7.5	Theories of Development
7.6	Trade and the World Economy
7.7	Changes as a Result of the World Economy
7.8	Sustainable Development

== Grade distribution ==
The exam was first held in 2001. Grade distributions for the Human Geography scores since 2002 were:

Final Score	1	2	3	4	5	% of scores 3 or higher	Mean score	Standard deviation	Number of students
2002	22.60%	15.70%	24.80%	20.50%	16.40%	61.70%	2.92	1.38	5,286
2003	20.30%	14.70%	24.10%	22.00%	19.00%	65.10%	3.05	1.39	7,329
2004	21.20%	17.10%	22.70%	22.20%	16.90%	61.80%	2.97	1.38	10,471
2005	24.50%	16.90%	23.20%	20.80%	14.70%	58.70%	2.84	1.38	14,139
2006	25.60%	16.00%	21.80%	19.70%	16.90%	58.40%	2.86	1.43	21,003
2007	32.90%	16.30%	21.80%	17.90%	11.20%	50.90%	2.58	1.39	29,005
2008	30.20%	18.30%	21.50%	17.90%	12.10%	51.50%	2.63	1.39	39,878
2009	33.20%	16.60%	21.90%	16.70%	11.60%	50.20%	2.57	1.39	50,730
2010	35.70%	17.40%	20.60%	16.50%	9.70%	46.90%	2.47	1.37	68,397
2011	31.50%	17.50%	21.20%	18.20%	11.70%	51.00%	2.61	1.39	83,841
2012	29.80%	17.80%	20.40%	19.50%	12.50%	52.40%	2.67	1.4	98,679
2013	28.30%	18.60%	20.70%	20.30%	12.00%	53.00%	2.69	1.38	114,361
2014	29.60%	18.40%	21.00%	20.00%	11.00%	52.00%	2.64	1.37	136,448
2015	29.50%	16.70%	21.10%	20.50%	12.20%	53.80%	2.69	1.39	159,609
2016	29.00%	19.10%	19.80%	20.10%	11.90%	51.80%	2.67	1.39	184,663
2017	33.90%	17.10%	21.00%	17.30%	10.70%	48.90%	2.54	1.38	199,756
2018	28.60%	17.00%	21.50%	19.80%	13.00%	54.40%	2.72	1.4	216,783
2019	34.10%	16.70%	20.10%	18.20%	10.80%	49.10%	2.55	1.39	225,235
2020	30.10%	10.90%	24.80%	22.40%	11.80%	59.00%	2.75	1.39	218,333
2021	32.40%	15.10%	18.30%	19.70%	14.40%	52.50%	2.69	1.46	211,735
2022	31.80%	15.00%	19.60%	18.70%	14.90%	53.20%	2.7	1.45	221,815
2023	31.60%	14.00%	18.40%	20.00%	16.00%	54.40%	2.75	1.48	247,043
2024	29.50%	14.30%	17.80%	20.50%	17.90%	56.10%	2.83	1.49	262,253
2025	9.90%	25.40%	22.50%	25.20%	17.00%	64.70%	3.14	1.25	282,781
2026	10%	24%	21%	26%	19%	66%			300,000
