= Jasper High School (Plano, Texas) =

T.C. Jasper High School
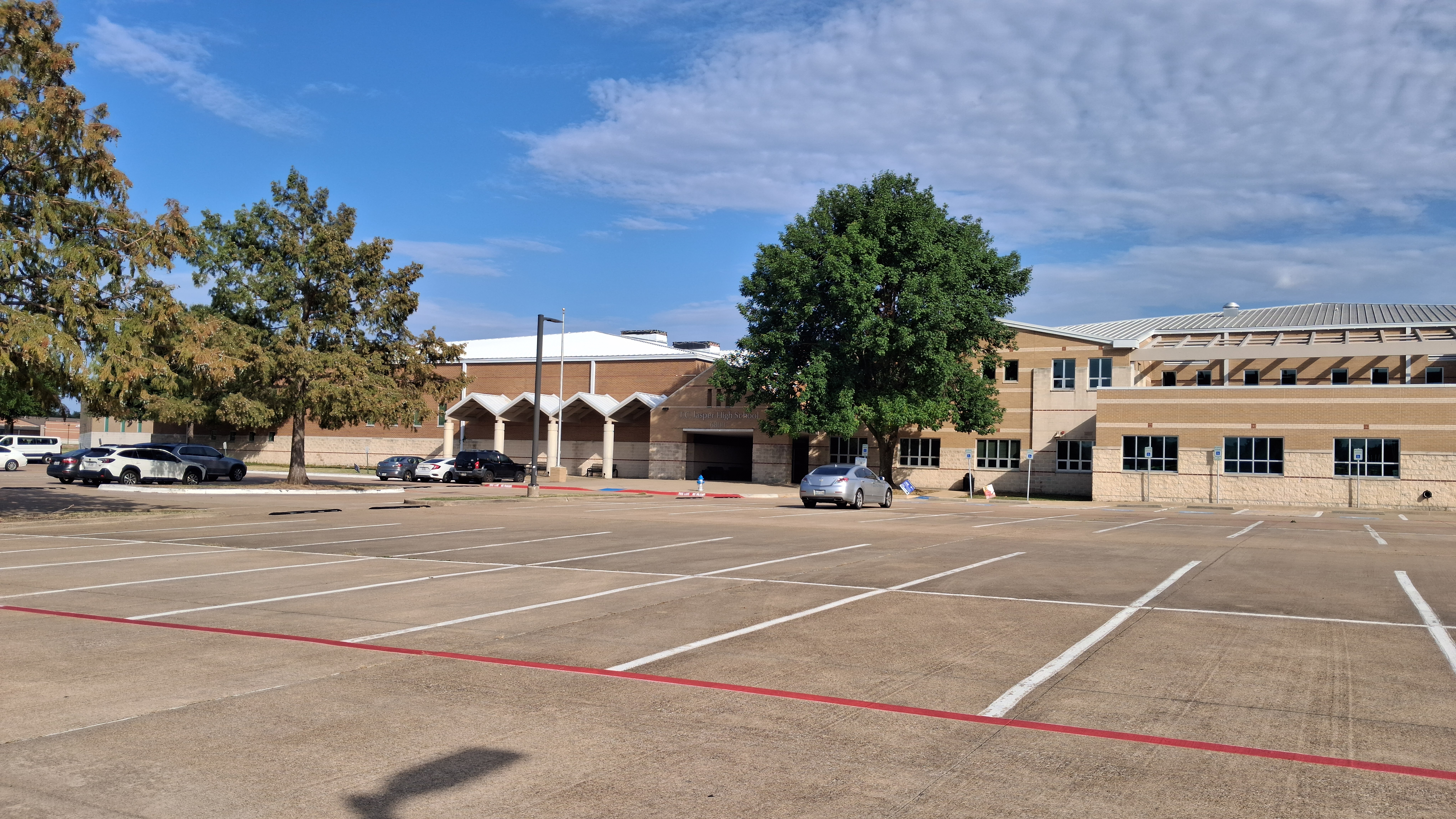
- The main entrance to Jasper High School

Location
- 6800 Archgate Drive; Plano, Texas 75024; United States; 33.0676°N 96.7832°W

Information
- School type: Public, High school
- Established: 1996; 30 years ago
- School district: Plano Independent School District
- NCES School ID: 483510007221
- Principal: Brooks Baca
- Teaching staff: 72.21 (on an FTE basis)
- Grades: 9–10
- Gender: Co-ed
- Enrollment: 1,301 (2024-2025)
- Student to teacher ratio: 18.02
- Campus size: 104 acres (0.42 km^{2})s (0.4 km^{2}) (shared)
- Campus type: Suburban
- Colors: Blue; Black; White
- Mascot: Wolf
- Website: jasper.pisd.edu

T. C. Jasper High School (also known as Jasper or JHS) is a public co-educational secondary school in Plano, Texas (USA) serving grades nine and ten. Founded in 1996, the school is part of the Plano Independent School District. Robinson Middle School and Rice Middle School feed into Jasper. Students leaving Jasper will attend Plano West Senior High School. The school colors are blue, black, and white, and the school mascot is the wolf.

In 2022, the school was rated an "A" by the Texas Education Agency.

== History ==
Jasper was the third school built on the 104-acre (0.42 km^{2}) parcel of land shared with Gulledge Elementary School and Robinson Middle School. Jasper was constructed in time for the 1996–1997 school year; however, the completion of the 240,000-square-foot (22,000 m^{2}), two-story building was not finished until July 1999. The company estimates that the construction cost was US$17,000,000. Jasper was the newest of the five 9–10 high schools in the Plano Independent School District. Jasper opened with an enrollment of 1,172 students, and a functional capacity of approximately 1,758 students.

In 2002, the Professional Development center was vacated. The area was then renovated, creating 7 classrooms and two offices, along with the enclosure of the outdoor dining area to create a dance room. The project, with a contract price of $700,157, was designed by Corgan Associates, Inc. and built by Tywell Construction Corporation. During the 2003 Bond Election held on August 23, 2003, a $3,500,000 addition of eight temporary classrooms was approved by a vote of 3,643 for to 1,499 against, in order to combat overcrowding in the school, which had reached 1,980. This was part of a $33,550,000 bond proposal of PISD.

On March 25, 2004, Big Sky Construction was chosen out of eight contractors to build an orchestra/band/choir hall. The company's proposal of $1,999,900 was more than $30,000 less expensive than the next cheapest bid to the school district. It was completed in that same year for a price of $2,000,000.

On November 28, 2005, the Plano Independent School District announced the beginning of an addition of a science wing to assist in increasing Jasper's functional capacity, as the population of the school had already exceeded 2,000 students. The addition was approved in a 2004 Facility Program Bond vote by the citizens of Plano. It was a project given to the Cadence McShane Companies, and was built along with new additions to Williams High School. The addition to Jasper was completed in July 2006, costing the school district approximately $7,501,893. Also added under the contract was a fourth cafeteria line and a multipurpose room. The wooden gym floors were redone during this same time.

On March 30, 2023, the Plano Independent School District announced the decision to align the feeder high schools with the senior high schools to increase cohesion and unity. This meant unifying the mascots, brands, and colors of Jasper High School with its feeder senior high school Plano West Senior High School. As a result, the mascot changed from a jaguar to a wolf, and the colors changed from green, black, and white to blue, black, and white. District uniform changes were implemented starting in 2023−2024, with facility changes following over the next three years.

=== Namesake ===
Jasper High School is named in honor of Plano banker and businessman Thomas Chilton "T.C." Jasper. Jasper was born on January 11, 1844, in Middleburg, Kentucky. He served in the Civil War in Company C, 6th Regiment Kentucky Cavalry. After the war, he returned to Kentucky and taught school. On January 8, 1874, T.C. married Mary Wilmoth Jones. The couple established a prosperous general store in nearby Mount Salem, Kentucky. Two of his children, Claude and Davie, were born there as well.

In 1887, T.C. moved his family to Plano, Texas, where his third child, Roy, was born. He quickly organized the Plano National Bank, investing out of his own pocket $40,000 of the $50,000 needed for new bank stock. The bank was chartered July 27, 1882, and T.C. served as cashier for 25 years before retiring in March 1913.

In addition to owning business properties in and around Plano, T.C. Jasper was a co-founder of the Plano Cotton Oil Company (established in 1902 and dissolved in 1916). In 1904, T.C., along with seven other men, formed the "44 Club"; its members were Confederate veterans and were all born in 1844.

He served as treasurer of the Texas Electric Railroad, was a deacon in the First Baptist Church, a Mason for 55 years (as well as a charter member of the Plano chapter), and an honorary member of the Lions Club. T.C. died in 1924 at the age of 80, after 50 years of marriage. His wife, Mary, died in 1940.

=== Previous feeder schools ===
Before 2009, Schimelpfenig Middle School students were zoned to go to Jasper. In 2009, Plano ISD voted that they could choose between Plano Senior High School and Plano West High School. In 2011, after a controversial debate on future overcrowding, the Plano ISD board voted that Schimelpfenig should be zoned to Plano Senior High, which meant they had to be zoned to Clark. Currently, Rice and Robinson feed to Jasper High School.

== Extracurricular activities ==
=== Academic competition ===
Jasper has a speech and debate team that competes up to the state level in the TFA (Texas Forensics Association), national level in the NSDA (National Speech and Debate Association), and the international level in IPPF (International Public Policy Forum). In 2019, Jasper was the runner up in the IPPF Finals competition. In 2024, Jasper was one of the co-champions of Public Forum Debate at the TFA's State Championship, closing out the round to Plano West Senior High School.

Jasper used to have a quizbowl club, until the program was discontinued by Plano ISD in 2024. Jasper qualified for the 2019, 2021, and 2022 NAQT (National Academic Quiz Tournaments) High School National Championship Tournaments.

=== Athletics ===
Jasper fields 13 teams in six different sports; 7 men's teams and 6 women's teams: football (9th and 10th grades), volleyball (9th and 10th grades), basketball (9th and 10th grades), tennis (9th and 10th grades), baseball, golf and track (9th and 10th grades). Students in Marching Band receive athletic credit towards graduation, as do students in the JROTC program.

=== Music program ===
==== Orchestra ====
The Legacy Orchestra has made 10 straight appearances as a finalist in the TMEA String Honor Orchestra competition and 19 appearances in 22 years, with 14 appearances in the top five. In 2012-2013, the Jasper Symphony Orchestra (Legacy Orchestra and Wind Ensemble members) won the title of 2014 Texas Honor Full Orchestra, becoming the first 9–10 grade full orchestra to be named Honor Orchestra in the state of Texas.

In 2023, Jasper's Legacy string orchestra was invited to the Midwest Clinic International Band and Orchestra Festival, being the first 9–10 grade school invited.

== Awards ==
- In October 2006, Jasper was one of eight PISD schools and 268 Texas public schools (out of 7,519, or the top 3%) to earn recognition on the Texas Business and Education Coalition Honor Roll.
- In 2019, Jasper High School was declared a National Speech and Debate Association School of Excellence in Speech.
