= Cypress Creek High School (Orlando, Florida) =

Secondary school in Florida, US

Location
- 1101 Bear Crossing Dr; Orlando, Florida; United States; 28.379706°N 81.376865°W

Information
- Type: Public Secondary
- Established: 1992
- School district: Orange County Public Schools
- Principal: Frederick Corn
- Teaching staff: 148.00 (on an FTE basis)
- Grades: 9–12
- Enrollment: 3,435 (2023–2024)
- Student to teacher ratio: 23.21
- Colors: Maroon, Silver, Black
- Mascot: Florida BlackBear
- Rivals: Freedom High School, Dr. Phillips High School, Oak Ridge High School, & Lake Nona High School
- National ranking: 1669
- Motto: To lead our students to success with the support and involvement of families and the community. To be the top producer of successful students in the nation.
- Website: cypresscreekhs.ocps.net

Cypress Creek High School is located in Orlando, Florida, and serves students in grades 9 through 12.

Cypress Creek is an IB World School with an International Baccalaureate Diploma Program. As an IB World School, CCHS is a local magnet school, allowing students from other Orange County schools to attend.

Cypress Creek High School receives graduating students from Meadow Woods Middle School, South Creek Middle School and Walker Middle School. However, it is a magnet school, so students from surrounding middle schools (e.g., Hunters Creek Middle School, Freedom Middle School, Westridge Middle School, Lake Nona Middle School, Southwest Middle School) also attend Cypress Creek, albeit in smaller numbers.

== Band ==
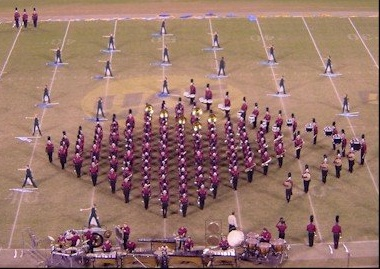
The CCHS Marching Band at the Bands of America Orlando Regional in October 2000.

The Cypress Creek Marching Band is a seven-time Florida Marching Band Coalition Class 4A Champion (in 1998, 1999, 2000, 2001, 2002, 2007, and 2010) and was named Grand Champion an unprecedented five times (1998–2002) before FMBC eliminated the Grand Champion title (now only class champions are named) The marching band was a Bands of America Grand Nationals Semi-Finalist two times, in 2000 and 2002, finishing in the top 20. Recently the Cypress Creek Marching Band was a Bands of America Orlando regional finalist placing 7th in 2018 and 9th in 2021.

The Cypress Creek Wind Ensemble has been guest-conducted by composers including Karel Husa (in 1996) and David Holsinger (in 2002). The group has performed at venues and festivals including Bands of America Marching and Concert Festivals in 1997 and 2000, and Carnegie Hall in April 2009. In 2011, the Wind Ensemble also performed for the second time at the Music for All National Concert Band Festival in Indianapolis, Indiana.

The Cypress Creek High School Winter Guard has competed in the Dayton, Ohio WGI World Championships since 1999. They have been finalists in the WGI competitions seven times since the school's opening. Recently the Cypress Creek Winter Guard finished 2nd at the FFCC Championships in class AA in 2022.

Under the direction of Leonardo Lamos and Michael Tabone.

== IB Diploma Program ==
The IB DP at Cypress Creek is notably recognized as performing among the top 1% of IB schools worldwide in regard to graduation rates within the program. The program starts with the Pre-IB curriculum in the first two years of high school. Students enter the program officially in their Junior year. The program is outlined as follows:

- IB Group 1 subjects: AP Literature and Composition (Junior Year), IB English HL IV
- IB Group 2 subjects: IB German SL or IB Spanish SL.
- IB Group 3 subjects: IB History of the Americas HL, IB Psychology HL or SL, IB ITGS
- IB Group 4 subjects: IB Biology HL or SL, IB Chemistry HL or SL, IB Physics SL
- IB Group 5 subjects: AP Calculus AB (Junior Year for Maths HL and SL), IB Math Studies SL, IB Mathematics HL or SL
- IB Group 6 subjects: IB Art, IB Theater, IB Music, IB Film
- Students are also required to complete a Theory of Knowledge class, Creativity, Action, Service (CAS) hours, and an Extended Essay.

The Cypress Creek German Program is also the largest German learning program in the state of Florida and among the most successful in national German language competitions.

== Notable people ==
- Christopher Duffy (2006), baseball player
- Mauricio Henao, actor
- Jammie Kirlew (2005), American football player
- Amar'e Stoudemire (2002), former NBA and international basketball player
