= Northcoast Preparatory Academy =

Coordinates: 40°51′51.58″N 124°4′31.23″W

Northcoast Preparatory and Performing Arts Academy
- The NPA Heron

Location
- 1761 11th Street, Arcata, California, USA

Information
- Type: Public Secondary
- Established: 2000
- Founder: Jean Bazemore
- School district: Humboldt County Office of Education
- Principal: Adam Hess
- Headmaster: Dr. Michael Bazemore
- Grades: 6–12
- Gender: Co-ed
- Campus: United Methodist Church
- Colors: Navy Blue and white
- Mascot: Heron
- Rival: Arcata High School
- National ranking: 93
- Newspaper: The Heron Herald
- Website: Official website

Northcoast Preparatory Academy, formerly known as Northcoast Preparatory and Performing Arts Academy and abbreviated as NPA, is an independent public charter high school located in Arcata, California. It is currently the second highest ranked high school in Humboldt County, California.

== History ==
NPA was founded in 2000 as the high school branch of the Northcoast Charter Network, providing a college preparatory program with an emphasis on the arts and sciences. In August, 2004 the International Baccalaureate Organization granted NPA status as an IB World School offering the IB Diploma Programme.

In 2009, NPA was ranked as the 30th top public high school in the United States by Newsweek Magazine.

In 2010, NPA was ranked as the 23rd top public high school in the United States by Newsweek Magazine.

In 2011, NPA was ranked as the 12th top public high school in the United States by The Washington Post.

In 2018, NPA was ranked as the 28th most Challenging high school in the United States by The Washington Post, and 96% of students passed at least one college-level exam during their high school career.

In 2016, the NPA middle school was opened on a different campus. It is currently being integrated into the IB Middle Years Programme.

== Curriculum ==
The school's curriculum focuses on college preparation and the IB Diploma Programme, plus a broad range of opportunities including:

- International travel
- Music
- Drama
- Art
- Community service
- Analytical and creative writing
- Research papers

According to the IB, NPA offers:

IB Group 1 subjects:

- English A lit

IB Group 2 subjects:

- French B
- Spanish AB

IB Group 3 subjects:

- History
- Philosophy

IB Group 4 subjects:

- Biology
- Physics

IB Group 5 subjects:

- Mathematical Studies SL
- Mathematics SL

IB Group 6 subjects:

- Dance
- Music
- Theater
- Visual Arts

IB Diploma Programme Courses:

- Theory of Knowledge

The school newspaper, the Heron Herald, is one of the electives students can choose to take.

The school's program also permits students to take advantage of courses taught at College of the Redwoods, the local 2-year college, and at Cal Poly Humboldt, the local university.

Each year there are at least two major dramatic productions, which are produced first locally at Gist Theater at HSU and then sometimes performed in the countries to which students travel that year.

== Demographics ==
According to Niche, 83% of the 139 students are white, 6.8% are Asian American, 5.7% are Hispanic, 1.7% are multiracial, 1.1% are African American, 1.1% are Native American and 0.6% are Pacific Islanders. 61% of students are female and 39% are male, with 34% of students coming from low-income families.

== Athletics ==
Sports at NPA include Men and Women's Varsity Tennis, Co-Ed Basketball, and Co-Ed Cross Country. Tennis is the most competitive, with both teams playing regularly in the H-DN league. The school is planning to transition the rest of the sports to the H-DN league in the upcoming years.

== Board of directors ==
The current members of the board are:

- Jessica Callahan, Chair
- Jillian Sheppard, Vice-Chair
- Rebecca Marie Hall
- Janelle Bucklin
