= Guangdong Country Garden School =

Private school in Foshan, China

Guangdong Country Garden School (CGS, Chinese: 广东碧桂园学校), is a private co-ed boarding school in Shunde District, Foshan City, just south of Guangzhou, in the People's Republic of China. CGS has a campus area of 33 hectares with more than 3,500 students on campus.

== History ==
CGS was founded in 1994, and was the first school established within Bright Scholar Education Group. CGS added IB Diploma Programme (International Baccalaureate) in 2001, and A-level (General Certificate of Education Advanced Level) and IGCSE programs (International General Certificate of Secondary Education) in 2007.

== Subjects ==
=== International Baccalaureate ===
As an IB school, CGS offers the IB Primary Years Programme (PYP), although it is heavily influenced by the Chinese national curriculum.

CGS also offers MYP (Middle Years Programme)

CGS also offers the following subjects at the DP level:

Language A:

- Chinese Language and Literature (at SL and HL)
- Chinese Literature
- English Language and Literature (at SL)

Language B:

- English B (at SL and HL)
- Chinese B (at SL and HL)
- Spanish ab intito (at SL)

Individual and Societies:

- Psychology (at SL and HL)
- Business Management (at SL and HL)
- Economics (at SL and HL)
- Geography (at SL and HL)
- History (at SL and HL)

Sciences:

- Biology (at SL and HL)
- Physics (at SL and HL)
- Chemistry (at SL and HL)
- Computer Science (at SL and HL)

Mathematics:

- Analysis and Approaches (at SL and HL)
- Applications and Interpretations (at HL only)

The Arts:

- Visual Art

Interdisciplinary:

- Environmental systems and societies (at SL only)

=== Advanced Placement ===
Currently, CGS offers the following subjects:

- AP 2-D Art and Design
- AP 3-D Art and Design
- AP Art History
- AP Biology
- AP Calculus AB
- AP Calculus BC
- AP Chemistry
- AP Chinese Language and Culture
- AP Comparative Government and Politics
- AP Computer Science A
- AP Computer Science Principles
- AP Drawing
- AP English Language and Composition
- AP English Literature and Composition
- AP Environmental Science
- AP European History
- AP Human Geography
- AP Macroeconomics
- AP Microeconomics
- AP Music Theory
- AP Physics 1
- AP Physics 2
- AP Physics C: Electricity and Magnetism
- AP Physics C: Mechanics
- AP Precalculus
- AP Psychology
- AP Research
- AP Seminar
- AP Statistics
- AP United States History
- AP World History: Modern

== Academic reputation ==
CGS has been a member of the International Baccalaureate for many years and has successfully completed 5 Year Programme Evaluations at the PYP (2011), MYP (2001), and DP levels (2001).

== School symbols ==
School song:《梦起碧桂》(Dreams Begin at Country Garden)
