= The Beacon Academy =

Private international school in the Philippines

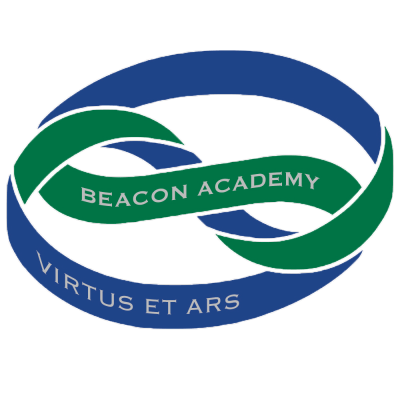

Location
- Cecilia Araneta Parkway, Biñan, Laguna; Philippines
- Coordinates: 14°15′18″N 121°02′07″E

Information
- Type: Coeducation, college-preparatory, international school
- Motto: Virtus et Ars (Latin: Goodness and Knowledge)
- Religious affiliation: None (secular)
- Established: 2009
- Head of school: Mark Vincent Escaler
- Grades: 7–12
- Campus size: 9 acres (0.036 km^{2})
- Colors: Green and Blue
- Mascot: Griffin
- Accreditation: International Baccalaureate; Philippine Department of Education
- Website: www.beaconacademy.ph

The Beacon Academy is a private international college-preparatory school in Biñan, Laguna, Philippines that offers the International Baccalaureate (IB) program. It is a sister school of the Beacon School in Makati, Metro Manila. The Beacon Academy brands itself as "an international school rooted in Filipino culture and ethos."

== History ==
The Beacon Academy was founded in 2009 by architect Leandro Locsin Jr., son of the late National Artist of the Philippines for Architecture Leandro Locsin, and his wife Mailin Paterno-Locsin. The school was established to serve as the high school extension of its sister school, the Beacon School, located along Chino Roces Avenue in Makati. According to Locsin Jr., the Beacon Academy aimed to continue the Beacon School's success of providing an internationally recognized curriculum that would provide Filipino parents an option for their children to maximize their potential as national and global citizens. Locsin added that its establishment was also a response to the rise of international schools in the country aiming to do the same. The school's campus opened in August 2010. Education Secretary Armin Luistro and Biñan Mayor Marlyn Alonte-Naguiat were among the guests of honor during the school's opening rites. Locsin Jr. currently serves as the Beacon Academy's board chairman.

The Beacon Academy was accredited by the IB on April 20, 2011.

== Campus ==
The campus of the Beacon Academy measures 9 acres (0.036 km^{2}), located approximately 45 kilometres (28 mi) south of Metro Manila. Heavily surrounded by greenery, it is situated on land donated by the Locsin family, the same land where the De La Salle University – Laguna Campus is situated on. It is also near the Ayala Westgrove Heights subdivision in Silang, Cavite, Laguna Technopark, and the Nuvali mixed-use residential development in Santa Rosa and Calamba, Laguna.

The Beacon Academy has two two-storey buildings; the main building containing 11 state-of-the-art classrooms, including four laboratories, and the secondary building containing seven classrooms, including a music room and a visual arts studio, as well as an auditorium and a gallery. The Beacon Academy's facilities also include an eight-lane Olympic-size swimming pool, a basketball court, a football pitch, a fitness room, and a climbing wall.

== Faculty and students ==
Branding itself as a "Filipino international school", the Beacon Academy community consists of mostly Filipinos. The school accepts foreign-based students and faculty, regardless of ethnic or religious background. An average class size is between 12 and 15 but not more than 20, as the school emphasizes its desire to cater more effectively to its students in an environment of personalized learning. Its faculty are secondary school teachers who have prior experience teaching in other secondary schools in the Philippines or abroad, some of whom also have experience teaching in colleges or universities. Its teachers regularly undergo extensive training programs to enhance their capabilities in effectively delivering the IB program to students.

== Educational curriculum ==
The Beacon Academy specializes in the application of the Harkness method of teaching and learning in its curriculum. Most of the school's classrooms contain an oval-discussion table or a similar setup where students sit facing each other. The Beacon Academy's curriculum utilizes discussion-based learning as a form of independent study in order to foster critical thinking and collaborative skills amongst its students. Leandro Locsin Jr., the school's co-founder, was an alumnus of the Phillips Exeter Academy in Exeter, New Hampshire, where the method was developed.

The Beacon Academy describes its curriculum as an "extensive" curriculum designed to effectively help its students enter the colleges and universities of their choice, either local or international, that is ideally the "best fit" for them.

The curriculum of the Beacon Academy follows the framework of the IB. Its partnership with the Beacon School is the only educational institution in the Philippines accredited by the IB to offer their three main educational programs (IB Primary Years Programme, IB Middle Years Programme, and IB Diploma Programme). The Beacon School offers the IB Primary Years Programme and the first three years of the IB Middle Years Programme (MYP), while the Beacon Academy offers the last two years of MYP and the IB Diploma Programme (DP). The Beacon School–Beacon Academy partnership is also the only educational institution in the country to offer the IB MYP. The Beacon Academy, however, only offers the following subjects in IB DP (listed per IB DP subject groups):

- Group 1: English language and literature, English literature, Filipino literature, Japanese literature
- Group 2: Chinese, Spanish, Spanish ab initio
- Group 3: anthropology, business management, economics, psychology
- Group 4: biology, chemistry, environmental systems and societies, physics
- Group 5: mathematical studies, mathematics
- Group 6: visual arts

== Extracurricular activities ==
A member of the League of Southern Manila Schools and the Manila International Schools Athletic Association, the Beacon Academy has varsity teams in badminton, basketball, chess, football, swimming, and volleyball that compete locally and regionally. The school also participates in local and regional Model United Nations conferences and actively competes in the World Scholar's Cup internationally. The Griffin Post is the official student publication of the Beacon Academy.

As of April 2019, the Performing Arts Club was established, featuring two original student-led plays. The first of which, Disaster on Big Bertha was released on May 30, 2019, while a direct sequel named The Sophomore Slump was released on December 12, 2019.

== See also ==
- Brent International School, an international school in Biñan also offering the IB program
