= Vienna International School =

Location
- Vienna; Austria
- 48°14′41.45″N 16°25′54.74″E

Information
- Type: Private
- Established: 1959
- Faculty: 174
- Grades: 1-12 (ELC 4-5, ELC 5-6)
- Enrollment: 1400
- Average class size: 17-24
- Student to teacher ratio: 1:8.3
- Campus type: Suburban
- Color: Blue/White
- Athletics conference: ISST, SCIS, DVAC, CEESA
- Mascot: Panthers
- Website: www.vis.ac.at

Vienna International School (VIS) is a profit international school in Vienna, Austria. The school was built to accommodate the children of United Nations (UN) employees and diplomats when the UN decided to locate one of its offices in Vienna (at the Vienna International Centre), and it remains affiliated to the UN. About 50% of students are children of UN employees and receive education grants, while much of the remaining students are children mainly of embassy staff and company staff. The school has an enrollment of 1400 students, from pre-primary to twelfth grade.

== History ==
=== International Community School ===
The first English language medium school in Vienna was set up in August 1955 as the International Community School. Previously, it had been the 'British Army School' in Schönbrunn barracks and catered for the children of the British occupying forces in Vienna. The Austrian State Treaty signed in May 1955 resulted in the occupying forces leaving Austria, so the school transformed into the International Community School under the patronage of the British, American and Indian Missions.

It opened on 1 September 1955 in the 18th district of Vienna. By the end of the year, 150 students between the ages of 3 and 15 years attended the International Community School. Soon the building proved too small for the expanding school, which moved into the 19th district. By 1959, 300 children represented 25 different nationalities in ICS. However, most of the children were American or Canadian, so the British and Indian Embassies started a separate British style school in 1959, the English School, while the ICS changed into the American International School.

=== English School ===
The English School moved into Grinzinger Straße 95, a premises found with the help of the British Ambassador, Sir James Bowker, the legal advisor at the Embassy Walter Rhodes, and Vienna's Deputy Lord Mayor, Hans Mandl. The English School quickly expanded and was visited by the British Minister of Education in 1961. Some of the first staff of the International Atomic Energy Agency sent their children to the English School in 1959. The school year 1961-62 saw the introduction of William Kirk as director. In May 1969, Queen Elizabeth II and Prince Philip visited the English School on a state visit to Vienna. In 1974, some families of the United Nations Industrial Development Organization (UNIDO) started sending their children to the school.

=== Vienna International School ===
In September 1977, Maurice Pezet was invited by the Austrian government to start the project of developing a Vienna International School on the model of the Geneva and New York United Nations Schools in preparation for the expansion of the United Nations to Vienna. Vienna is one of the four headquarters of the UN, along with New York, Geneva and Nairobi. The Vienna International Centre (UNO City) is leased to the United Nations for 1 Austrian schilling (7 euro cents) per year. It was anticipated that there would be two years of preparation for the small existing English School to be incorporated into the school development plan for the Vienna International School (VIS).

The Vienna International School opened its doors on 11 September 1978 to pupils of 60 nationalities. Primary and secondary were accommodated on Grinzinger Straße and Kindergarten was located on Heiligenstädter Strasse. A part of secondary moved briefly to Zollergasse and then Schloss Pötzleinsdorf. A year later, secondary school moved to Peter-Jordan-Straße, where it remained until the custom built present campus was opened in September 1984 with Maurice Pezet as director. The chancellor at the time, Bruno Kreisky, had initiated the idea of a new, specially built school. The campus was entirely funded by the Austrian government. Kreisky employed Maurice Pezet, formerly associated with the UN School in New York (UNIS), to manage the project. He became the first director of the new Vienna International School. Kreisky was present at some of the opening events at the VIS. The new building was constructed in the 22nd District, two U-Bahn (underground) stops from the VIC, and opened in September 1984. It is located on Straße der Menschenrechte, two hundred metres away from the U1 Kagran underground station and the Donau Zentrum Shopping Mall.

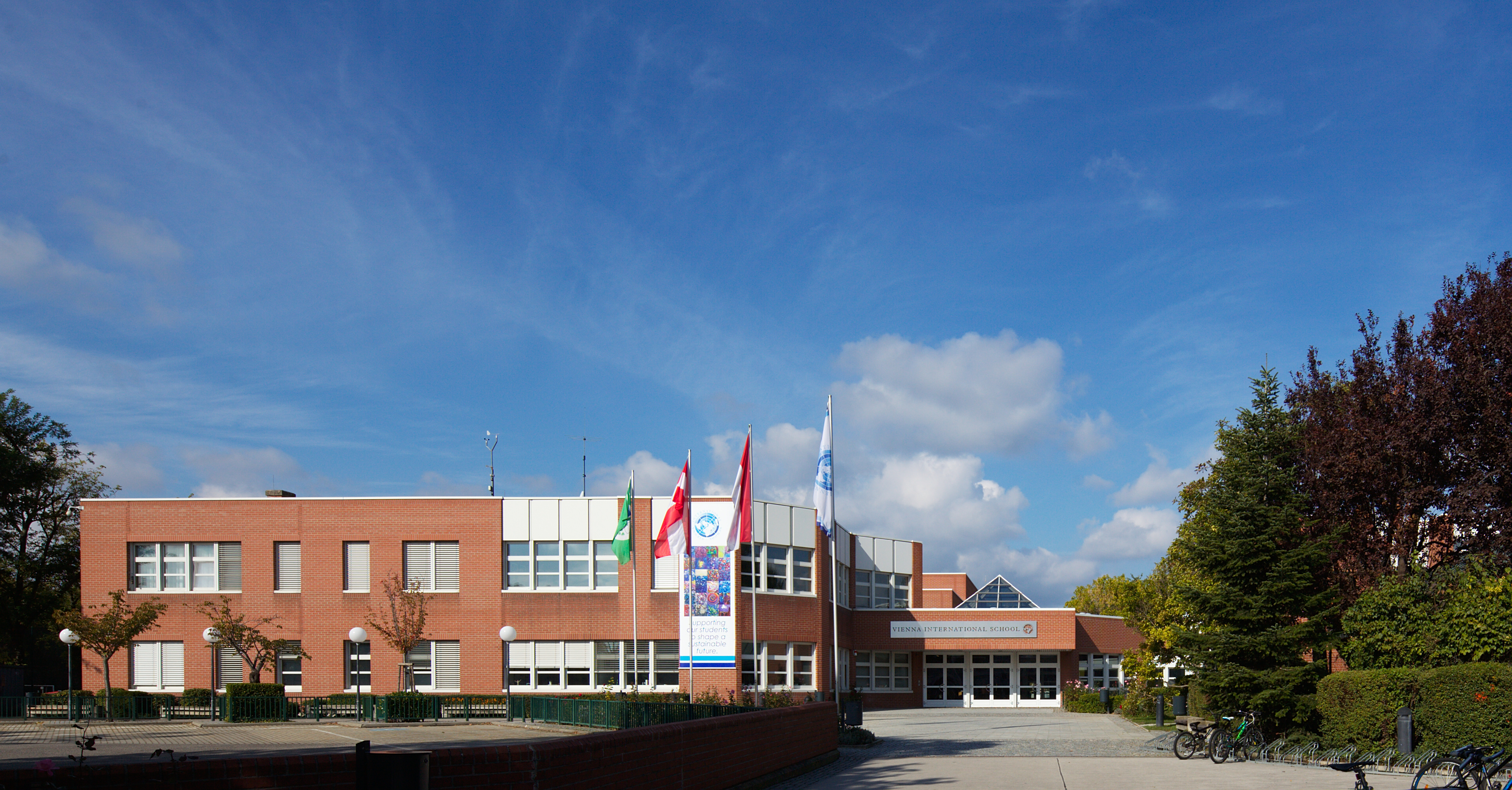
Main entrance of Vienna International School

== Facilities ==
The school campus includes facilities for performing arts, visual arts, science, design, sports, and environmental education. These include a 220-seat theatre, seven music rooms, three art studios, three design laboratories, seven science laboratories, a food technology centre, two product design studios, and four experimental learning spaces known as Garden Classrooms. The school's Primary and Secondary Library holds 55,000 items.

Outdoor and sports facilities include five gymnasia, a playing field and running track, three playgrounds, an outdoor theatre arena, and an outdoor ecology learning centre. The campus also includes the Panther Sports Dome, which contains a cycling and running trail, workout station, table tennis, and an arboretum.

== Academics ==
VIS offers all three programs of the International Baccalaureate (IB) - International Baccalaureate Primary Years Programme (IBPYP), International Baccalaureate Middle Years Programme (IBMYP) and the IB Diploma Programme (IBDP). The school has offered the IB Diploma programme since 1984.

=== Accreditation ===
The school is an IB World School. It is also accredited by the Council of International Schools (CIS), Eco Schools and Umweltzeichen.

=== Graduation requirements and courses ===
For the IB Diploma, students must select one each from the following groups. The following subjects were offered at VIS:

==== Group 1: Language 1 ====
- English A Literature HL & SL
- English A Language and Literature HL & SL
- German A Literature HL & SL
- German A Language and Literature HL & SL

It is also possible to study a privately taught mother tongue as Group 1 language at HL or SL

==== Group 2: Language 2 ====
- English B HL & SL
- German B HL & SL
- German ab initio SL
- French B HL & SL
- Spanish B HL & SL

==== Group 3: Individuals and Society ====
- Economics HL & SL
- Geography HL & SL
- History HL & SL
- Psychology HL & SL
- Environmental Systems and Societies SL

==== Group 4: Experimental Sciences ====
- Biology HL & SL
- Chemistry HL & SL
- Physics HL & SL
- Design Technology HL & SL
- Computer Science HL & SL
- Environmental Systems and Societies HL & SL (transdisciplinary course)

==== Group 5: Mathematics ====
- Mathematics AA HL & SL
- Mathematical AI HL & SL

==== Group 6: The Arts ====
- Music HL & SL
- Theatre HL & SL
- Visual Arts HL & SL
- Film HL & SL

Rather than taking an arts course, students may opt to take another subject from Groups 1 to 5 as their 6th subject

== Athletics ==
=== Sports ===
VIS offers the following teams during the year, in addition to other sports:

- Season 1: Soccer, High School Volleyball, Cross Country Running, Rugby
- Season 2: Basketball, Alpine Skiing
- Season 3: Golf, Track & Field, Middle School Volleyball, Rugby

=== Conferences ===
VIS participates in the following athletics conferences:

- Danube Valley Athletics Conference (DVAC)
- Sports Council of International Schools (SCIS)
- Central and Eastern European Schools Association (CEESA)
- International Schools Athletic Association (ISAA)

In addition to this, VIS traditionally organizes the annual Hauser Kaibling Race in Haus Im Ennstal between international schools in Austria, Germany and Switzerland.

== Charity ==
Community service forms part of both the International Baccalaureate Middle Years Programme (MYP) and Diploma Programme (DP) at Vienna International School, and requires students to take an active part in the communities in which they live. The school states that the programme emphasises developing community awareness and acquiring the skills needed to make an effective contribution to society.

=== Maher ===
Vienna International School identifies Maher as its main charity and states that it has supported the organisation since 2005.

=== Project Centipede ===
The school states that each year primary school students collect food, clothing, shoes, toys, school supplies, and toiletries for donation to Project Centipede, which distributes the gifts to children and caregivers in Romania, India, Hungary, Ukraine, and Austria before the December holidays.

=== 2004 Tsunami disaster response ===
According to the school, following the 2004 Indian Ocean earthquake and tsunami, the VIS community helped to rebuild a school in Indonesia that had been severely affected by the disaster.

=== Fairtrade ===
The school also has a Fairtrade group that promotes the purchase of products intended to provide better returns and living conditions for farmers in less economically developed countries.

== Notable alumni ==
- Tobias Ellwood, British politician
- Salam Pax, Iraqi blogger

== Scouting ==
Vienna International School is the home of Vienna International Scout Group 88 (German: Wien 88-Internationale Pfadfindergruppe). The Scout group is affiliated to Boy Scouts and Girl Guides of Austria.

They also offer The Duke of Edinburgh program.
