= Yangon International School =

- ရန်ကုန်အပြည်ပြည်ဆိုင်ရာကျောင်း
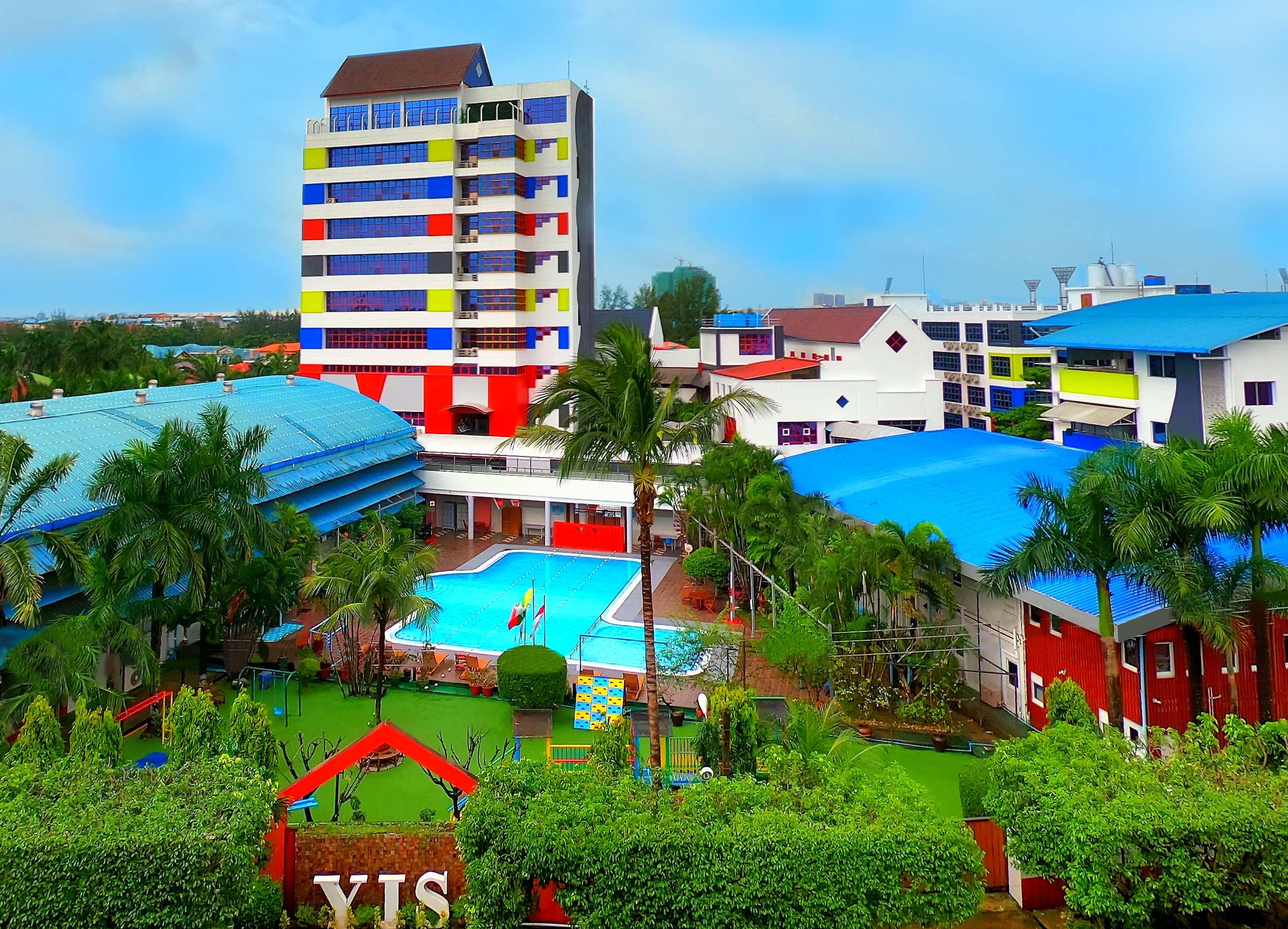

Location
- 117 Thumingalar Housing; Thingangyun Township; Yangon, Yangon Region 11071; Myanmar; 16.826509859660288°N 96.19247724344433°E

Information
- Type: International School
- Established: 2004
- Director: Mr. Mike Livingston
- Staff: 50+ Teachers
- Grades: Pre-K–12
- Enrollment: 250+
- Classes offered: American Curriculum with the IB Diploma Program
- Colors: Maroon; Khaki
- Mascot: Eagle
- Website: Yangon International School

Yangon International School (YIS; Burmese: ရန်ကုန်အပြည်ပြည်ဆိုင်ရာကျောင်း) is a private, early childhood through 12th grade college-preparatory school in Yangon, Myanmar. It offers an American-based curriculum and the International Baccalaureate Diploma Programme (IBDP) in Grades 11 and 12.

The school operates two campuses: the main campus in Yangon and an additional campus in Mandalay.

== History ==
Yangon International School was founded in 2004 by U Tin Maung Win and his family under the International Language & Business Centre (ILBC). The school initially offered an American curriculum and Advanced Placement (AP) courses at the high school level. YIS became an IB World School in June 2020 and now offers the International Baccalaureate Diploma Programme (IBDP) for students in Grades 11 and 12.

== Demographics ==
As of 2020, approximately 80% of the student body held Myanmar nationality, with the remaining students originating from countries such as South Korea, Thailand, Japan, Bangladesh, India, Bhutan, Canada, and the United States. The teaching staff is primarily composed of American and Canadian educators, with additional faculty members from Australia, India, New Zealand, South Africa, and the United Kingdom.

== Accreditations ==
- IB World School – Authorized by the International Baccalaureate
- Fully accredited by the Western Association of Schools and Colleges
- Managed by the International Schools Services
- Member of EARCOS (The East Asia Regional Council of Schools)
- Member of the Yangon Athletic Conference

== Campuses and facilities ==
=== Yangon Campus ===
The Yangon campus provides all grade levels, from early childhood through the IBDP. It houses:

- Little Eagles Toddlers Program (Early Childhood)
- Elementary School
- Middle School
- High School (including the IB Diploma Programme)

The campus is divided into two sections separated by a road, connected by an elevated bridge linking the Myanmar Studies Building to the 9-storey main tower.

Side A (main academic buildings):

- 9-storey main tower housing high school and elementary school classrooms, administrative offices, and libraries
- 4-storey middle school building

Side B (athletics and additional facilities):

- Multipurpose gymnasium
- Swimming pool
- Covered outdoor court
- 4-storey Myanmar Studies Building
- Playground area located behind the pool

=== Mandalay Campus ===
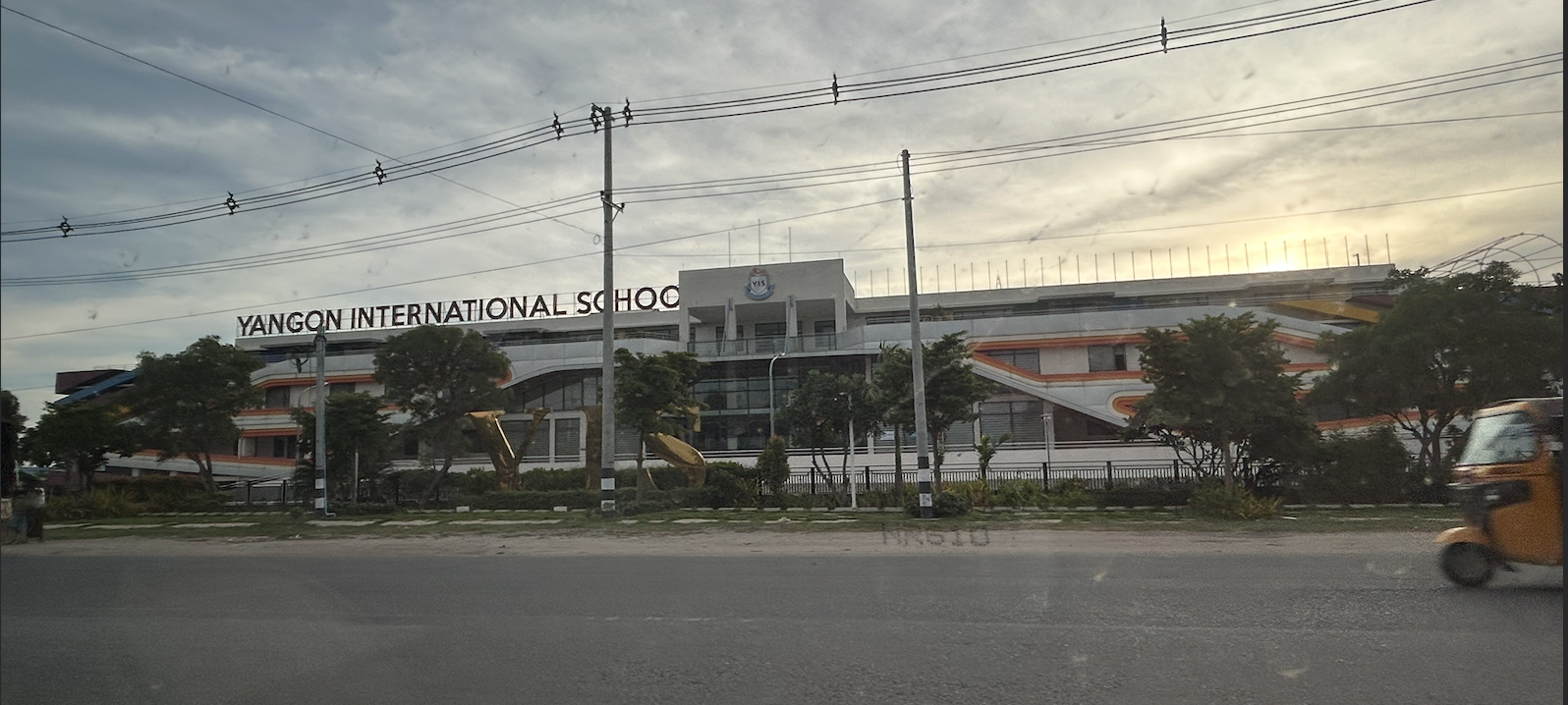
The Mandalay campus of Yangon International School

Yangon International School–Mandalay opened in August 2020. It is a private, co-education school offering early childhood and elementary education, with long-term plans to expand grade levels. The initial rollout included pre-school through Grade 8, with one additional grade level intended to be added each year until reaching Grade 12.

The Mandalay campus was constructed on a newly developed site on the eastern side of the city in Mahar Aung Myay Township, an area near low-rise residential neighborhoods and open fields. The location is a short distance from central Mandalay, Mandalay Hill, and the Royal Palace.

The campus includes several purpose-built educational facilities, such as:

- art and music rooms
- multiple libraries
- STEAM and science laboratories
- an olympic-sized swimming pool
- a gymnasium
- a theatre

== Curriculum ==
Yangon International School offers the following subjects within the International Baccalaureate Diploma Programme (IBDP):

Group 1: Studies in Language and Literature

- English A: Language and Literature (SL/HL)
- Myanmar A: Literature (SL/HL)

Group 2: Language Acquisition

- Mandarin Ab Initio (SL)
- Mandarin B (SL/HL)
- Spanish Ab Initio (SL)
- Spanish B (SL/HL)

Group 3: Individuals and Societies

- Economics (SL/HL)
- Psychology (SL/HL)

Group 4: Sciences

- Biology (SL/HL)
- Chemistry (SL/HL)
- Physics (SL/HL)

Group 5: Mathematics

- Mathematics: Analysis and Approaches (SL/HL)
- Mathematics: Applications and Interpretation (SL/HL)

Group 6: The Arts

- Visual Arts (HL/SL)

YIS Mandalay offers a U.S.–based curriculum aligned with Common Core State Standards, incorporating project-based learning and the WIDA framework for English language development. The school has indicated its intention to seek accreditation from the Western Association of Schools and Colleges (WASC).
