= CGS (disambiguation) =

CGS or cgs is the centimetre–gram–second system of physical units.

CGS may also refer to:

== Organizations ==
- Canwest Global Communications Corporation (TSX symbol), a former Canadian media conglomerate
- CGS Aviation, an American manufacturer of ultralight aircraft
- Center for Genetics and Society, US
- California Geological Survey, US
- Central Geological Survey, Taiwan
- Council of Graduate Schools, in Washington, DC, US
- CUSIP Global Services, the operating body of CUSIP
- China Geological Survey
- CGS, an American government contractor owned by BlueCross BlueShield of South Carolina

=== Education ===
- Canberra Grammar School, ACT, Australia
- Caulfield Grammar School, Victoria, Australia
- Chittagong Grammar School, Bangladesh
- Guangdong Country Garden School, China
- Caistor Grammar School, Lincolnshire, England
- Colyton Grammar School, Devon, England
- Crescent Girls' School, Singapore
- Boston University College of General Studies, Massachusetts, United States
- Commonwealth Governor's School, a group of schools in Virginia, United States

== Other uses ==
- C.G.S. colony, housing for government workers in Mumbai, India
- Canadian Government Ship, a ship prefix
- Certificate of graduate studies (C. G. S.), a graduate certificate
- Championship Gaming Series, an international eSports league
- Chief of the General Staff, a senior army appointment in several countries

== See also ==
- CG (disambiguation)
