= Yis =

Yis or YIS may refer to:

- Yi people
- Yis language
- Yangon International School
- Yishun MRT station (station abbreviation YIS), Singapore
- Yokohama International School
- Yogyakarta International School, a primary and secondary school in Yogyakarta, Indonesia
