= Beacon Academy =

Beacon Academy may refer to:

- Beacon Academy, Cleethorpes, a coeducational secondary school in Cleethorpes, North East Lincolnshire
- Beacon Academy, Crowborough, a coeducational secondary school and sixth form located in Crowborough, East Sussex
- The Beacon Academy, a private international college-preparatory school in Biñan, Laguna, Philippines
