= Creativity, activity, service =

Mandatory core service

Creativity, Activity, Service (CAS) (formerly Creativity, Action, Service) is a mandatory core component of the IB Diploma Programme. It aims to provide a "counterbalance" to the academic rigour of the educational programme. Before the 2017 examination there was a 150-hour requirement, with an approximately equal distribution of creativity, activity, and service. This requirement was removed mainly for two reasons: to ensure that students engage in meaningful activities and to decrease the amount of CAS fraud (i.e. claiming hours which have not been completed). Students are now expected to have two CAS activities for each CAS category and students need to prove that they are participating in CAS activities on a weekly basis (though not necessarily all CAS categories each week). Moreover, students must have one CAS project which spans at least a month. Finally, one must prove that the CAS activities have resulted in the seven projected outcomes of CAS (one CAS activity can have multiple outcomes).

== CAS aims ==
The function of CAS is to allow IB schools the opportunity to "give students the means to learn through experience [and] how to take actions in the service of others."

All the portions (creativity, activity, and service) are vaguely defined and should, according to the International Baccalaureate Organisation, be interpreted as imaginatively as possible, so that a wide array of different activities can qualify for CAS. The learning outcomes and the quality of the CAS activity are of utmost importance.

== Documentation ==
While individual schools or regions have different methods of documentation, all require some form of proof, often the signature of the supervisor of the experience, to be presented after its completion. Students must also personally keep track of their CAS work in either a log or "diary" format. This allows for students to monitor their experiences and to present a coherent documentation of their entire CAS experience, including reflections on their experiences. Some schools subscribe to online tools which include pages on which students can document their experiences and post reflections.

== Assessment ==
CAS is internally assessed. However, IBO can ask for a number of random samples to be submitted. A failure to complete and provide evidence for completion is considered a failing condition for the entire diploma. However, candidates are given another year to finish their CAS program if they fail, and if they complete it in this time they will receive their diploma. One important aspect of CAS that many of its administrators inform their students is that CAS itself is a lifelong goal to strive for.
