= IB Middle Years Programme =

International educational programme

The International Baccalaureate Middle Years Programme (MYP) is an educational programme for students between the ages of 11 and 16 around the world as part of the International Baccalaureate (IB) continuum. The Middle Years Programme is intended to prepare students for the three-year IB Diploma Programme and IB Career-related Programmes.

It is used by many schools internationally, and has been available since 1994. It was updated in 2014 and called MYP: New Chapter.

In the Middle Years Programme students are required to receive instruction in all eight subject groups: Language Acquisition, Language and Literature, Individuals and Societies, Sciences, Mathematics, Arts, Physical and Health Education, and Design.

== Overview ==
In 2014, the International Baccalaureate Organisation introduced a new more flexible programme for the middle years, which was then called the MYP: Next Chapter, though by 2019, it had transitioned into MYP. The IB MYP does not specifically prescribe a curriculum in most subjects in order to enable the embedding of local curriculum in the framework. The full strategy involves approaches to learning strategy, concept-driven teaching and the global context strategy, and school organisation with collective planning, vertical structuring and cooperation with the community.

To officially participate in an official IB Middle Years Programme, students must attend an authorised IB World School. In the U.S., the MYP is often taught throughout middle school and the first two years of high school. Typically, middle schools and high schools work in coordination with each other.

A student receives at least 50 hours of instruction per year in each of eight subject groups each year though certain flexibility is permitted to reduce this to six during the final two years. The full programme lasts five years although shorter programmes of two, three, or four years, could be negotiated in 2016.

=== Learner profile ===
At the centre of the MYP is the IB Learner Profile, which defines the type of students all the IB programmes (Primary Years Programme (PYP), Middle Years Programme (MYP), and Diploma Programme (DP) are intended to develop. They are:

- Caring
- Balanced
- Open-minded
- Knowledgeable
- Communicators
- Risk-takers
- Principled
- Reflective
- Inquirers
- Thinkers

=== Global Contexts ===
There are six Global Contexts (GCs) which are applied to every unit of every course the student takes. They are designed to help students recognise the connection between what they learn in the classroom and the world around them, to tie the various subject areas together, and eventually to help students "see knowledge as an interrelated, coherent whole."

The Global Contexts should be linked to all topics taught in class and every assessment that is set.

The Global Contexts are:

1. identities and relationships
2. personal and cultural expression
3. orientation in space and time
4. scientific and technical innovation
5. fairness and development
6. globalisation and sustainability

=== Community service ===
A core part of IB MYP is community service, also known as Service as Action (SaA), or Community Engagement. This requires students to undergo community service throughout the programme.

Some schools and districts either require or highly encourage a set number of hours of community service to be completed by each student, while other schools may require students to complete the "Community Project" for students to complete the programme during Year 3 or 4.

=== Personal Project ===
The "Personal Project" is a culmination of student learning, and is a year-long project completed in the final year of the MYP. Just as with the extended essay in the IB Diploma Programme, students are required to choose an academic or non-academic topic subject for their project that is personal to them. Students are required to keep a journal while working on the process, and schedule regular meetings with a teacher who will serve as their supervisor for the project throughout the year. While students should aim to complete a product for their project, this is not assessed. Instead, students must write a 15-page final report that makes up the final grade, which focuses on planning the project, applying approaches to learning skills (ATL skills), and reflecting. If candidates are aiming to achieve the MYP certificate, they must achieve at least 3 out of 7 for their Personal Project report.

== Curricular framework ==
The programme is based on the six global contexts. They are not generally taught as separate courses, but rather as themes that are reflected in all eight subject groups.

In addition to these eight subject groups, in MYP year 5, students complete the long-term project (the personal project) on a topic of their choice, with teacher supervision (which is graded on separate criteria). Students in MYP year 3-4 complete the community project.

=== Subject groups ===
The subjects taught in the MYP are divided into eight subject groups.

Name in 2020	Before 2014
Language and Literature	Language A
Language Acquisition	Language B
Integrated Humanities (Individuals and Societies)	Humanities
Sciences	Sciences
Mathematics	Mathematics
Arts	Arts
Physical and Health Education	Physical Education
Design	Technology

Schools can choose the subjects they teach within each subject group and how many. However, each subject group must receive a minimum of 50 hours of curriculum time each academic year. In years 4 and 5, schools can request to only require students to receive 50 hours of instruction in six of the eight subject groups.

A student could take another "Language and Literature" course if they have sufficient proficiency in both (In MYP years 4&5 this could replace the Language Acquisition course). Schools are given much flexibility to allow them to introduce subjects they consider important and organize their own student assessment and reporting procedures.

However, the MYP gives clear assessment criteria for each subject group. The criteria progressively get harder with the first year of MYP using the MYP 1 criteria set, then the second and third year using the MYP 3 criteria set and finally the last two years using the MYP 5 criteria set. Each year, MYP students should participate in one interdisciplinary activity that combines at least two of the subject groups; there is a separate criteria set for interdisciplinary learning, titled "evaluating", "synthesising" and "reflecting".

=== IB MYP Certificate (Optional) ===
The MYP Certificate is the formal internationally recognised award related to the MYP. The MYP eAssessments are the form of the optional external moderation introduced in 2016. To receive the MYP Certificate, each candidate must complete at least one eAssessment in each of these areas:

- Language and literature
- Individuals and societies
- Sciences
- Mathematics
- Interdisciplinary learning
- Language acquisition (or second Language and literature)
- Physical and health education, Arts, or Design
- The MYP Personal project

Within each area, the subject with the highest score, on the scale of 1 to 7 is counted, the results will be tallied to create a total out of 56. The pass mark is 28 and the candidate must meet the Service as Action requirements set by the school.

IB MYP Certificate eAssessment in 2016
How it will be marked	Type of Assessment	Group	Offering
Individually, externally marked	On Screen Examination Subjects	Language and Literature	Arabic
Individually, externally marked	On Screen Examination Subjects	Language and Literature	Chinese
Individually, externally marked	On Screen Examination Subjects	Language and Literature	Dutch
Individually, externally marked	On Screen Examination Subjects	Language and Literature	English
Individually, externally marked	On Screen Examination Subjects	Language and Literature	French
Individually, externally marked	On Screen Examination Subjects	Language and Literature	German
Individually, externally marked	On Screen Examination Subjects	Language and Literature	Spanish
Individually, externally marked	On Screen Examination Subjects	Individuals and Societies	Geography*
Individually, externally marked	On Screen Examination Subjects	Individuals and Societies	History
Individually, externally marked	On Screen Examination Subjects	Individuals and Societies	Integrated Humanities*
Individually, externally marked	On Screen Examination Subjects	Sciences	Biology*
Individually, externally marked	On Screen Examination Subjects	Sciences	Chemistry*
Individually, externally marked	On Screen Examination Subjects	Sciences	Physics*
Individually, externally marked	On Screen Examination Subjects	Sciences	Integrated Sciences
Individually, externally marked	On Screen Examination Subjects	Mathematics	Mathematics
Individually, externally marked	On Screen Examination Subjects	Mathematics	Extended Mathematics*
Individually, externally marked	On Screen Examination Subjects	Interdisciplinary	Interdisciplinary learning**
Internally marked, externally moderated with Dynamic sampling	Course Work ePortfolio	Language Acquisition (a 1:1 oral exam sent for external moderation)	Arabic
Internally marked, externally moderated with Dynamic sampling	Course Work ePortfolio	Language Acquisition (a 1:1 oral exam sent for external moderation)	Chinese (Mandarin)
Internally marked, externally moderated with Dynamic sampling	Course Work ePortfolio	Language Acquisition (a 1:1 oral exam sent for external moderation)	Dutch
Internally marked, externally moderated with Dynamic sampling	Course Work ePortfolio	Language Acquisition (a 1:1 oral exam sent for external moderation)	English
Internally marked, externally moderated with Dynamic sampling	Course Work ePortfolio	Language Acquisition (a 1:1 oral exam sent for external moderation)	French
Internally marked, externally moderated with Dynamic sampling	Course Work ePortfolio	Language Acquisition (a 1:1 oral exam sent for external moderation)	German
Internally marked, externally moderated with Dynamic sampling	Course Work ePortfolio	Language Acquisition (a 1:1 oral exam sent for external moderation)	Hindi
Internally marked, externally moderated with Dynamic sampling	Course Work ePortfolio	Language Acquisition (a 1:1 oral exam sent for external moderation)	Spanish
Internally marked, externally moderated with Dynamic sampling	Course Work ePortfolio	Arts	Visual art
Internally marked, externally moderated with Dynamic sampling	Course Work ePortfolio	Arts	Media arts
Internally marked, externally moderated with Dynamic sampling	Course Work ePortfolio	Arts	Theatre
Internally marked, externally moderated with Dynamic sampling	Course Work ePortfolio	Arts	Music
Internally marked, externally moderated with Dynamic sampling	Course Work ePortfolio	Arts	Dance
Internally marked, externally moderated with Dynamic sampling	Course Work ePortfolio	Physical and Health Education	-
Internally marked, externally moderated with Dynamic sampling	Course Work ePortfolio	Design	-
Internally marked, externally moderated with Dynamic sampling	MYP Personal Project	N/A	Moderation in Arabic
Internally marked, externally moderated with Dynamic sampling	MYP Personal Project	N/A	Moderation in Chinese (Mandarin)
Internally marked, externally moderated with Dynamic sampling	MYP Personal Project	N/A	Moderation in English
Internally marked, externally moderated with Dynamic sampling	MYP Personal Project	N/A	Moderation in French
Internally marked, externally moderated with Dynamic sampling	MYP Personal Project	N/A	Moderation in Japanese
Internally marked, externally moderated with Dynamic sampling	MYP Personal Project	N/A	Moderation in Russian
Internally marked, externally moderated with Dynamic sampling	MYP Personal Project	N/A	Moderation in Spanish
Internally marked, externally moderated with Dynamic sampling	MYP Personal Project	N/A	Moderation in Swedish
Internally marked, externally moderated with Dynamic sampling	MYP Personal Project	N/A	Moderation in Turkish

=== Assessment criteria ===
Each subject group uses four criteria to mark a student's ability in the subject. At the end of the year, teachers give a final score, out of eight, on each criterion based on the student's performance throughout the whole year.

MYP: Next chapter grade boundaries
Total Criteria Levels	Grade
0-5	1
6-9	2
10-14	3
15-18	4
19-23	5
24-27	6
28-32	7

The scores of the four criteria are added up and converted to a grade out of seven. This grade is meant to demonstrate the student's overall ability in the subject, with 1 being the lowest achievement and 7 the highest achievement. In eAssessment, these boundaries are determined by the International Baccalaureate.

MYP: Next Chapter Criteria for Each Subject Group

Language and Literature

- A: Analyzing
- B: Organizing
- C: Producing Text
- D: Using Language

Language Acquisition

- A: Listening
- B: Reading
- C: Speaking
- D: Writing

Individuals and Societies

- A: Knowing and Understanding
- B: Investigating
- C: Communicating
- D: Thinking Critically

Sciences

- A: Knowing and Understanding
- B: Inquiring and Designing
- C: Processing and Evaluating
- D: Reflecting on the Impacts of Science

Mathematics

- A: Knowing and Understanding
- B: Investigating Patterns
- C: Communicating
- D: Applying Mathematics in Real-Life Contexts

The Arts

- A: Investigating
- B: Developing
- C: Creating/Performing
- D: Evaluating

Physical and Health Education

- A: Knowing and Understanding
- B: Planning for Performance
- C: Applying and Performing
- D: Reflecting and Improving Performance

Design

- A: Inquiring and Analysing
- B: Developing Ideas
- C: Creating the Solution
- D: Evaluating

Interdisciplinary learning

- A: Evaluating
- B: Synthesising
- C: Reflecting

Personal Project

- A: Planning
- B: Applying Skills
- C: Reflecting

== History and development of the IB Middle Years Programme ==
The Middle Years Program was developed significantly later than the Diploma Programme, and in parallel to and independently of what would become the Primary Years Programme. The Middle Years Programme's "birthplace" is considered to be the International School Moshi, in Tanzania, today known as the United World College East Africa, which had been the first school to introduce the IB diploma to the African continent. In the late 1970s the school identified a pedagogical disconnect stemming from teaching the British O-levels curriculum to students aged 12–15, and then the International Baccalaureate Diploma for students 15–18. The headmaster at the time, Lister Hannah, led discussions on the potential of developing a new three year pre-IB curriculum at the Association of International Schools in Africa conference in Nairobi in October 1978. Hannah, together with the heads of the International School of Lusaka, Zambia, and the International School of Tanganyika in Dar es Salaam, Tanzania, engaged in discussions with the International Baccalaureate Organization and the International Schools Association (ISA) about establishing a new pre-IB programme. In 1980, the school hosted a conference of the International Schools Association (ISA) in Moshi, titled 'The Needs of the Child in the Middle Years of Schooling (ages 12–15)'. This conference recommended the development of a course to meet the needs of students aged 12–15 years, with a focus on six key 'needs', which were described as Global, Intellectual, Personal, Physical, Creative, and Social.

Further workshops and conferences (Lusaka in 1981, New York City in 1981, Wersen in 1981, London in 1982, and Cyprus in 1983) brought additional schools into the conversation, including the International School of Geneva (Ecolint), the United Nations International School (UNIS) in New York City, and the Vienna International School, and established a framework for what would become the ISA curriculum (ISAC), and later the Middle Years Programme. It was during this time that Gérard Renaud, previously a teacher at Ecolint and then Director General of the IB, and Robert Belle-Isle, who was the director at UNIS and had previously been the superintendent of the Chambly school district in Quebec, became involved in the initiative.

From 1983 to 1990 the discussions crystallized into a four-year curriculum for students aged 12–15, rather than a purely pre-IB course. At the 1987 ISA annual conference in Svendborg, it was decided to pilot the newly designed curriculum. Three schools took part in the initial pilot: the Heritage Regional High School in Montreal, Quebec, Canada (in Belle-Isle's former school district of Chambly); Het Rijnlands Lyceum in the Netherlands; and St Catherine's School in Buenos Aires, Argentina. The Vienna International School joined soon after, and other school boards in Quebec became interested in the program at MacDonald Cartier, and around 20 schools soon began implementing the experimental program.

The ISAC programme was taken over by the International Baccalaureate Organization in the early 1990s, officially becoming the IB Middle Years Programme in 1994.

== Discussion ==
=== Evidence of benefit ===
The Chicago Tribune reported that in 1998 in that city's Beverly area, only 67 students in the 8th grade chose to attend a local public high school offering an IB curriculum. When a cluster of Beverly schools introduced the IB Middle Years Programme in the 1999–2000 school year, the number of 8th graders who chose to attend the local high school then increased to about 150. One student was quoted, "I had really good teachers in the IB."
