= IB Group 6 subjects =

Subject group in the International Baccalaureate program

The Group 6: The Arts subjects of the International Baccalaureate Diploma Programme consist of five courses at both Standard Level (SL) and Higher Level (HL): Dance, Music, Theatre, Visual Arts, and Film. The transdisciplinary course Literature and Performance (satisfying the requirements of Groups 1 and 6) is also available at Standard Level. Students seeking the IB Diploma may substitute courses from the other five Subject Groups instead of taking a Group 6 course (see below). A school-based syllabus devised by an IB World School, as approved and externally moderated by the IB, may also form the basis for a course taken in place of a Group 6 course.

== Dance SL and HL ==
IB Dance is available at both standard level (SL) and higher level (HL). For both levels, the candidate must complete an internal assessment, (performance task), and two external assessments (composition and World Dance Investigation).

One of the external assessment components requires candidates to write an analytical essay, (the World Dance Investigation, or WDI), comparing and contrasting two dance styles, one of which is familiar to the candidate, and the other is not. At SL, the WDI is 1500 words, whereas at HL, the WDI is 2500 words and must include a comparison of one short dance excerpt from each of the styles being analysed. At SL, the WDI is weighted at 20%, and at HL, the WDI is weighted at 25%.

The second external assessment component is Composition and Analysis. The candidate is required to choreograph either two dances totalling 6 - 10 minutes at SL, or three dances totalling 8 - 15 minutes at HL. At HL, two of the dances must show clear compositional contrast. One of the dances in this component must be accompanied by an analytical statement (800 words at SL or 1000 words at HL), documenting and reflecting upon the choreographic process. At HL the statement must include a discussion of how other sections of the IB Dance course have influenced the dance being discussed. At SL, Composition and Analysis is weighted at 40%, and at HL, Composition and Analysis is weighted at 35%.

In the internal assessment component (Performance), SL candidates are required to submit one or two dances totalling 3 - 6 minutes, where at least one dance is a solo or a duet, and HL candidates are required to submit two or three dances totalling 6 - 9 minutes, where at least half the time submitted is solo or duet work. For both levels, the dances must be presented at an open showing, and the works must be choreographed by someone other than the candidate. At both levels, short programme notes must be submitted detailing basic information about the dance, including the choreographer's name and the dance's intention. At both levels, Performance is weighted at 40%.

In both SL and HL Dance, the emphasis is placed on developing a thorough understanding of diverse dance forms and their cultural contexts. This includes studying the evolution of dance styles and their impact on modern practices. HL students are expected to demonstrate a higher level of analytical and choreographic skill, integrating feedback from their internal assessments to refine their compositions.

== Music SL and HL ==
IB Music can be taken at either the standard level (SL) or higher level (HL). For both levels of IB Music the candidate must conduct a musical investigation. This requires research of two completely different musical genres with comparable qualities (e.g. Tuvan throat singing and Baroque opera). The information will then be presented in the form of a media script which will be assessed externally.

There are three paths in which the IB Music SL course can be taken: group performance, solo performance, or composition. To fulfill the performance requirements, the candidate must perform either a 15-minute solo recital, or a 20-30 minute ensemble performance. A candidate who chooses composition should compose two original compositions (of which one may be an arrangement of an existing piece of music), each lasting between 3 and 6 minutes. Each of the two compositions should be recorded for assessment purposes. A score of both compositions must also be submitted.

The IB Music HL course combines a medley of the IB Music SL options into a single curriculum. To satisfy IB Music HL, the candidate must perform solo for a total of 20 minutes and write three contrasting compositions (of which one may be an arrangement), each between 3 and 6 minutes.

All candidates sit a written exam at the end of the course, which lasts 3 hours for HL candidates and 2 hours 15 minutes for SL candidates. HL and SL candidates answer two questions from section A (study of two prescribed works), of which one MUST be a comparison between the two prescribed works. HL and SL candidates are also required to complete Section B of the exam, which is aural analysis of four previously unheard extracts, of which two are named, and one has a score provided. Two candidates are unnamed and do not have a score provided. HL only candidates must also complete section C, a comparison of two extracts from section B. Section A responses must be written in essay form. Responses in sections B and C may be in bullet points.

Both SL and HL Music students are encouraged to explore a wide range of musical genres and techniques, enhancing their understanding of global music traditions. HL students engage in more complex analysis and production tasks, reflecting a deeper immersion in the subject. The program also promotes cross-cultural musical exploration, which enriches students' appreciation of diverse musical landscapes.

Further details of the course can be found in the IB Music Wikibook.

== Theater SL and HL ==
According to the new syllabus introduced in 2009, the IB Theater Arts programme is made out of four components; two are internally assessed and two are externally assessed. The internal assessments are the Theater Performance and Production Presentation (TPPP) and the Independent Project Portfolio (IPP). The external components are a Practical Performance Proposal (PPP) and a Research Investigation (RI).

The TPPP is a presentation on the student's involvement in their performance and production aspects of all areas of the core syllabus. The presentation is 30 minutes long for HL and should be supported by 7–10 visual materials (no larger than A4). For SL, the presentation is 20 minutes long and should be supported by 5–7 visual materials (no larger than A4).

The IPP is a portfolio of 3000 words at HL and 2000 at SL in which the student reflects on his/her learning and development during the production of an independent project, which is a project in which the student explores and practices a role in the theater (actor, director, dramaturg, scriptwriter, etc.). It should also show a connection to their experiences in the core syllabus. There are two options: Option A: Devising Practice and Option B: Exploring Practice. The portfolio must include sections marked Preparation, Action, and Reflection.

For the PPP, the student has to adopt a directorial perspective and write a concept for a play using one of the prescribed stimuli. For SL, it contains a 250-word pitch and explanatory, visual material that illustrates the student's understanding of the intended process of realization. For HL, it also includes a 1,000-1,250 word rationale.

The RI is a research essay in which the student presents his or her research on a previously unfamiliar theater practice. From the chosen theater practice, students should choose a specific aspect of a play or theater piece and create a research question to answer. Student's research should contribute to a realization of the play or theater piece from their chosen theatrical practice. The practice cannot be studied in class and must be no later than the 19th century. The question must be taken from a directorial, actor, or designer perspective. For SL, the essay must be 1,500-1,750 words with visual documentation and/or textual references. For HL, the essay must be 2,000-2,500 words with visual documentation and/or textual references. At HL, students must also write a critique of the sources in the research investigation.

== Visual Arts SL and HL ==
There are two areas of focus in the IB Visual Arts subject. The first is studio (practical work) and the second is the research workbook (known as the Investigation Workbook). The Visual Art program aims to teach the student about design, structure and the aesthetic development of work. The candidates must demonstrate creative and personal thinking, feeling and interaction with their work.

The exam for Visual Art encourages the candidate to articulate their concerns and development over the course of the two years of study. An exhibition will be held at the candidate's school showcasing the candidate's work and is assessed by his/her teacher. The assessment is an interview where the candidate talks about their exhibited works, this interview is recorded and sent overseas for moderation. However, the alternate to the interview process is to write a 1000 word statement on your IB journey in Visual Arts. This given mark is then moderated against the Record of Workbook, which contains a collection of photographs of the candidates work and a number of scanned pages from their research workbook.

The candidates' research workbooks are also marked, once internally and once externally (for moderation purposes). These books aim to show the candidates journey over the two years of study. They document art and design history that is relevant to the candidate’s exploration of ideas and will also contain notes, sketches, photographs, mind-maps and pictures of inspiration, development and final works. The candidate must also document a number of art exhibition visits.

For the final assessment, either the studio work or the investigation work book can be assessed externally. With 60% of the final grade being placed on that which is externally assessed, and the remaining 40% on the internal assessment.

== Film SL and HL ==
IB Film can be taken at either the standard level (SL) or higher level (HL). For both levels of IB Film, the candidate must research and write a Textual Analysis, write and edit a 10-minute Comparative Study, and complete a 9-minute Film Portfolio. HL students must also complete a 6-7 minute Collaborative Film project.

The Textual Analysis is a research project in which the candidate undertakes an individual investigation based on the close analysis of a 5-minute extract from a film prescribed by the IBO, which also places the extract on a broader sociohistorical context and in terms of the film as a whole. It is marked externally.

The Collaborative Project, only required of HL students, takes the form of a short film (6–7 minutes in length) and a production rationale about the work undertaken. Students work in groups, focusing only on a certain role within the project.

The Film Portfolio is a collection of films made by the student throughout their time in the class. Both SL and HL candidates must focus on three of five main production roles: Director, Writer, Cinematographer, Editor or Sound Designer. More niche roles such as Visual Effects are also permitted. Each role must have a film reel of up to 3 minutes, comprising up to 3 short films, and the total portfolio may not exceed 9 minutes. One of the roles must be made up of only one film, showcasing a student's ability to create longer projects. Each film is accompanied by a written reflection, detailing their process.

The Comparative Study is a video essay of up to 10 minutes in length, comparing two works of 30 years separation and/or from different countries of a student's choosing. Students must write the essay, record themselves reading it, and edit a video essay using clips from the films. The student must focus on cultural contexts and film techniques within the works, comparing and contrasting them with regards to a film focus such as genre.

Film SL is offered online to students enrolled in the IB Diploma Programme.

== Substituting courses from other subject groups ==
Group 6 subjects are considered electives, thus an IB Diploma candidate may substitute a variety of courses from other subject groups in lieu of taking a Group 6 course. This would result in a student studying an extra subject from either Group 2 (Second Language), Group 3 (Individuals and Societies) or Group 4 (Experimental Sciences).
