= IB Group 1 subjects =

Subject group in the International Baccalaureate program

The Group 1: Studies in language and literature (previously First Language) subjects of the IB Diploma Programme refer to the student's first language (native language or otherwise best language). Three courses are available: Language A: literature, Language A: language and literature and an interdisciplinary subject, Literature and performance. Students who complete two group 1 subjects (instead of a group 1 and group 2 subject), or complete a group 3 or 4 subject that is of a different language of the group 1 subject taken by the candidate, are eligible to be awarded a bilingual IB Diploma on the condition that the candidate obtains a level 3 or greater in both subjects.

== Language A: literature ==
Language A: literature (previously known as Language A1) is a recently updated literature course, for first examinations 2013. The course is designed to "encourage students to appreciate the artistry of literature and to develop an ability to reflect critically on their reading". The course is available at both Standard Level (SL) and Higher Level (HL), where the HL curriculum is slightly more demanding than that of SL. The course is officially available in over 50 languages, and there is a special request service available (only for May sessions) for languages that are not officially supported.

=== Syllabus ===
The course is divided into four parts. All works chosen must feature as part of teaching and applying knowledge.

- Part 1: Works in translation (SL: 2 works, 40 hours; HL: 3 works, 65 hours) - As its name implies, this part focuses on works that are originally written in a different language, but translated into the language concerned. The aim of this part is to "deepen students’ understanding of works as being products of a time and place". Works are chosen from the prescribed literature in translation (PLT) list published by the IBO. Knowledge of this part is assessed through the written assignment.
- Part 2: Detailed study (SL: 2 works, 40 hours; HL: 3 works, 65 hours) - This section of the course focuses on the detailed analysis of the works in terms of both content and technique of writing. This part aims to encourage close reading and in-depth analysis of significant elements in each work. Works are chosen from the prescribed list of authors (PLA) and are of different literary genres and different authors (at HL one of the works must be poetry). Knowledge of this part is assessed through the individual oral commentary.
- Part 3: Literary genres (SL: 3 works, 40 hours; HL: 4 works, 65 hours) - Works in this part are chosen from the same literary genres from the PLA. The purpose of this is to allow a framework for the comparative study of the chosen works through exploring the literary conventions and features associated with the genre. Knowledge of this part is assessed in paper 2.
- Part 4: Options (SL: 3 works, 30 hours; HL: 3 works, 45 hours) - Works for this part are freely chosen by the teacher and can be in any combination, hence its name. Students are assessed on their literary understanding of the works in this part, as well as the ability to produce an effective oral presentation.

In total, SL students study 10 works and HL students study 13 works.

=== Assessment ===
For all languages at both SL and HL there are five assessment components.

==== External assessment ====
- Paper 1: Guided literary analysis (SL: 1 hour 30 minutes)/Literary commentary (HL: 2 hours) (20 marks weighing 20% of the course) - Candidates write a commentary on one of the two unseen passages - a prose and a poetry. SL candidates must respond to the two guiding questions given in the question paper - one on understanding and interpretation and another on style. HL candidates are assessed for their exploration of the various literary aspects and how their effects are achieved.
- Paper 2: Essay (25 marks weighing 25% of the course, 1 hour and 30 minutes for SL, 2 hours for HL) - Candidates write a comparative essay based on one of the three essay questions given for the literary genre studied in part 3 of the course. Responses must be based on at least two works from this part, but reference can be made from one of the works studied in part 2 as well. Candidates will not have access to the works studied.
- Written assignment (25 marks weighing 25% of the course) - Candidates submit a 1200 to 1500-word analytical literary essay on a topic generated by the candidate, based on a work studied in part 1. This is done in 4 stages - the interactive oral (journal writing for self-taught candidates), the reflective statement, topic development and the production of the essay. The journal writing (for self-taught candidates) and reflective statement, of 300-400 words, is also submitted for assessment.

External assessment accounts for 70% of the grade for the course.

===== Alternative oral examination =====
SL school-supported self-taught candidates undertake the alternative oral examination instead of the internal assessment components. They are essentially the same as the internal assessment components, except that they are externally assessed and some administration procedures are different. The alternative oral examination accounts for 30% of the final grade.

==== Internal assessment ====
- Individual oral commentary (SL & HL: 20 minutes preparation & 10 minutes delivery) and discussion (HL only: additional 10 minutes) (30 marks weighing 15% of the course) - SL and HL candidates complete a recorded literary analysis on an extract of a part 2 prose (20-30 lines, 40 lines for self-taught students) or the whole or part of a part 2 poem (for HL students this must be the poem studied), set with one or two guiding questions. Candidates deliver the prepared commentary for a maximum of 8 minutes, then engage in a 2-minute discussion on the extract or poem (self-taught students deliver for the full 10 minutes; there is no discussion element). HL students will then continue uninterrupted into the 10-minute discussion on another part 2 work that wasn't used for the commentary. Recordings and marks are then sent for moderation.
- Individual oral presentation (30 marks weighing 15% of the course, 10 to 15 minutes) - Candidates prepare and deliver a presentation based on a part 4 work or works studied (self-taught students must use two of the works). Candidates can choose a topic on their own personal interest based on any aspect of the work(s) chosen. The presentation can be in the form of a standard analysis or a creative activity (this requires a rationale). The presentation can be created in pairs or small groups, but each candidate must present individually. This component is not recorded or submitted (except for self-taught students, where both the recording and notes in point form are submitted for external assessment) and is moderated through the individual oral commentary.

Internal assessment accounts for the remaining 30% of the final grade of the course.

=== Available languages ===
As of the 2014 exam session, courses in the following languages are automatically available in May examination sessions, while those denoted with (N) are also automatically available in November (i.e. fewer languages are available in November compared to May):

- Albanian
- Amharic
- Arabic
- Belarusian
- Bengali
- Bosnian
- Bulgarian
- Catalan
- Chinese (N)
- Croatian
- Czech
- Danish
- Dutch
- English (N)
- Estonian
- Filipino
- Finnish
- French (N)
- German (N)
- Hebrew
- Hindi
- Hungarian
- Icelandic
- Indonesian (N)
- Italian
- Japanese (N)
- Korean (N)
- Latvian
- Lithuanian
- Macedonian
- Malay
- Modern Greek
- Nepali
- Norwegian
- Persian
- Polish
- Portuguese (N)
- Romanian
- Russian
- Serbian
- Sesotho
- Sinhala
- Slovak
- Slovene
- Spanish (N)
- Swahili
- Swedish
- Thai
- Turkish (N)
- Ukrainian
- Urdu
- Vietnamese
- Welsh

Exams in other languages are available upon special request (only available for May sessions), except for Afrikaans and Swati (SL only) which are only available in the November session.

== Language A: language and literature ==
Language A: language and literature is a new course for first examinations 2013, intended to replace the Language A2 course in group 2. The main aim of the course is to "encourage students to question the meaning generated by language and texts, which, it can be argued, is rarely straightforward and unambiguous". The course is available at both Standard Level (SL) and Higher Level (HL). The course is currently only available in 17 languages.

=== Syllabus ===
The course is divided into four parts - two of language and two of literature.

- Part 1: Language in cultural context (SL: 40 hours, HL: 60 hours) - This part explores how language develops in specific cultural contexts, its impact on the world and how it forms individual and group identity. It enables candidates to investigate the role of language in relation to many areas involved in the construction of meaning and understanding of particular issues in the world. Some topics that can be explored in this part are gender issues, sexuality, communities, individual identity, power, history of the language, translation, science and technology, social relations, beliefs and taboos.
- Part 2: Language and mass communication (SL: 40 hours, HL: 60 hours) - This part focuses on the exploration of the use of language in the media, including newspapers, magazines, the internet, mobile telephony, radio and film. It also discusses how the creation and reception of texts is influenced by its delivery medium. Some topics that can be explored in this part are bias, stereotypes, popular culture, speeches and campaigns, government administration, media institutions, editing, persuasive language and entertainment.
- Part 3: Literature — texts and contexts (SL: 2 texts, 40 hours; HL: 3 texts, 70 hours) - In this part, candidates explore the ways in which social, cultural and historical contexts influence the creation of literary text through close reading and analysis. Candidates will also acknowledge that interpretations of texts differ between people of different backgrounds. For both SL and HL one text must be taken from the prescribed literature in translation (PLT) list. For SL, the other text can be chosen freely, as long as it is originally written in the language being studied. For HL, the second text must be taken from the prescribed list of authors (PLA) for the studied language, and the last text can be chosen freely without restrictions.
- Part 4: Literature — critical study (SL: 2 texts, 30 hours; HL: 3 texts, 50 hours) - In this part, candidates will explore literary texts closely, analyse texts and make use of literary terms. All texts chosen for this part must be taken from the PLA.

=== Assessment ===
There are three external assessment components and two internal assessment components.

==== External assessment ====
- Paper 1: Textual analysis (SL: 1 hour 30 minutes)/Comparative textual analysis (HL: 2 hours) (20 marks weighing 25% of the course) - SL candidates write an analytic commentary on one unseen text from a choice of two, and HL candidates write a comparative analytic commentary on one pair of unseen texts from a choice of two pairs.
- Paper 2: Essay (25 marks weighing 25% of the syllabus, 1 hour 30 minutes for SL, 2 hours for HL) - Candidates respond to one of the six questions given by writing an essay based on at least two texts studied in part 3 of the course. They are expected to demonstrate the learning outcomes of part 3 through the analysis of how the meaning of the texts is shaped by the contexts of production and reception
- Example Essay: Carol Ann Duffy, "The Worlds Wife", essay sample by a professor. The poem "Little Red Cap" by Carol Ann Duffy offers a compelling and multifaceted reinterpretation of the classic fairy tale "Little Red Riding Hood." Through her unique lens, Duffy not only reimagines the protagonist's journey but also delves deep into the characterization of the wolf, transforming him into a symbol that transcends his traditional role as a mere antagonist. This essay explores Duffy's depiction of the wolf, examining how this portrayal serves as a vehicle for themes of sexuality, power, and the transition from innocence to experience. At the outset, Duffy's wolf is not merely a predatory animal but a metaphor for the male figures that dominate the realms of art, literature, and society. Unlike the simplistic villain of the original tale, Duffy's wolf embodies the complexities and nuances of masculinity and authority. He is depicted as both enticing and dangerous, a figure that intrigues Little Red Cap and symbolizes the challenges and temptations that she, as a young woman and an emerging poet, must navigate. The wolf's introduction as a photographer, who captures Little Red Cap "in his viewfinder," immediately establishes him as a figure of control and objectification. This portrayal is a stark commentary on how young women are often seen through the male gaze, reduced to mere objects of desire. However, Duffy's Little Red Cap is not a passive victim; she is drawn to the wolf out of curiosity and a desire for knowledge. The wolf, with his "better view" of the world, represents the allure of the unknown and the forbidden, tempting Little Red Cap with the promise of wisdom and power beyond the domestic sphere she seeks to escape. The power dynamics between Little Red Cap and the wolf are central to the poem's narrative. Initially, the wolf appears to hold all the power, with his knowledge, his worldliness, and his physical strength. However, as the poem progresses, there is a shift. Little Red Cap, through her engagement with the wolf, grows stronger, more confident, and more knowledgeable. She learns to wield her own power, ultimately taking control of her destiny. The act of killing the wolf is symbolic of her liberation from the constraints of traditional femininity and her rejection of the male-dominated world that the wolf represents.
- A conclusion is specifically important for IB : Carol Ann Duffy’s "Little Red-Cap" is a sophisticated and layered text that interrogates and dismantles the gender norms perpetuated by traditional myths and legends. The poem's modern perspective on the representation of women in literature presents a narrative of empowerment, autonomy, and the reclamation of the female voice. Through the use of vivid language, evocative symbolism, and intertextual references, Duffy transforms the protagonist from a passive character into an emblem of strength and agency. This work stands as a testament to the power of retelling stories, highlighting the evolving roles of women in literature and society. For an IBDP HL English student aiming for the highest marks, this essay offers an in-depth analysis of Duffy's poem, showcasing an understanding of both the thematic and linguistic nuances that challenge and redefine traditional gender roles in myths and legends.
- Written tasks (20 marks (SL)/40 marks (HL) weighing 20% of the course) - SL students will need to produce at least three written tasks (at least one based on parts 1 or 2, and at least one based on parts 3 or 4) throughout the course. One of these is submitted for assessment. HL students will need to produce at least four written tasks (at least one based on parts 1 or 2, at least one based on parts 3 or 4, and at least one of task 2). Two of these are submitted for assessment.
  - The SL written task and HL written task 1 are creative pieces of writing used to explore an aspect of the material in the course. Students are free to choose the topic and type of text for the written tasks as long as it is not a formal essay or commentary of any kind. Each task must be within 800 to 1000 words and a rationale of 200 to 300 words must be included before it.
  - The HL written task 2 is a critical response to one of the six prescribed questions, two from each area of study. Each task must be within 800 to 1000 words.

External assessment accounts for 70% of the grade for the course.

==== Internal assessment ====
- Individual oral commentary (30 marks weighing 15% of the course, 20 minutes preparation & 15 minutes delivery) - Candidates prepare and deliver a recorded critical commentary on an extract (not more than 40 lines, or a full poem) of a part 4 text, set with two guiding questions. Candidates deliver the commentary for about 10 minutes, then engage in a discussion with the teacher for about 5 minutes. Recordings and marks are sent for external moderation.
- Further oral activity (30 marks weighing 15% of the course) - Candidates must complete at least two oral activities, at least one based on part 1 and at least one based on part 2. This allows candidates to explore some of the topics of the two parts of the course. It can be any form of activity the student prefers, depending on the classroom arrangement. The mark for the best activity is submitted for final assessment.

Internal assessment accounts for the remaining 30% of the final grade of the course.

=== Available languages ===
This course, as of exams in 2014, is currently only available in the following 17 languages for the May session. The 7 languages which are also available in November sessions are denoted with an (N).

- Arabic
- Chinese (N)
- Dutch
- English (N)
- French (N)
- German (N)
- Modern Greek
- Indonesian (N)
- Italian
- Japanese
- Korean
- Norwegian
- Portuguese (N)
- Russian
- Spanish (N)
- Swedish
- Thai

There is no special request service for Language A: language and literature.

== Literature and performance ==
Literature and performance (known as Text and performance in the pilot stage) is a new interdisciplinary subject, available from first examinations in 2013. It is a combination of literature and theatre arts, thus satisfying both the requirements of group 1 and group 6. It is only available at standard level (SL). The course aims to enable candidates to link and explore the relationship between the two components of literature and performance.

=== Syllabus ===
The course is split into three parts.

- Part 1: Critical study of texts (50 hours) - Candidates read closely a variety of literary texts and interpret, explore the meaning and analyse the effect of each text.
- Part 2: Exploration of the chosen approach to the text (40 hours) - Candidates explore texts in terms of their performance potential, and formulate ideas to change prose and poetry into a dramatic performance.
- Part 3: Realization of texts in performance (60 hours) - Candidates learn to prepare a performance and deliver scripted drama to an audience. They also learn to analyse and evaluate performances through speech and writing.

=== Assessment ===
There are three external assessment components and one internal assessment component.

==== External assessment ====
- Paper 1: Prose and performance (20 marks weighing 20% of the course, 1 hour 30 minutes) - Candidates write an essay from a choice of three questions concerned with the problems associated with dramatizing a novel.
- Paper 2: Poetry (25 marks weighing 20% of the course, 1 hour 30 minutes) - Candidates write one comparative essay from a choice of six questions.
- Written coursework: Major playwrights in performance (20 marks weighing 20% of the course) - Candidates critically analyse the realization of an extract, or a series of linked extracts, from a play created by a playwright listed in the prescribed list of authors (PLA) and subsequently reflects on their own performance in a staged interpretation of it. The coursework must be between 1500 and 2000 words long.

The external assessment components carries 60% of the final grade of the course.

==== Internal assessment ====
- Performance (5 minutes) and individual oral presentation (15 minutes) (40 marks weighing 40% of the course) - Candidates deliver one performance during the course, based on the transformation of one or more poetry and prose texts studied. The texts chosen cannot be the ones used for papers 1 and 2. Following that, candidates give a structured oral presentation about his or her performance.

This component carries the remainder 40% of the final grade of the course.

=== Available languages ===
The course is only automatically available in English for both the May and November sessions. It is also available in French and Spanish only in May sessions upon special request.
