= IB Group 4 subjects =

Subject group in the International Baccalaureate program

The Group 4: Sciences subjects of the International Baccalaureate Diploma Programme comprise the main scientific emphasis of this internationally recognized high school programme. They consistent of seven courses, offered at both the Standard Level (SL) and Higher Level (HL): Physics, Chemistry, Biology, Computer Science, Design Technology, Environmental Systems and Societies (an interdisciplinary course that also meets the Group 3: Humanities requirement), and Sports, Exercise and Health Science (SEHS). Astronomy, Marine Biology, and region-specific courses also exist as a school-based syllabus. Students taking two or more Group 4 subjects may combine any of the aforementioned instead of taking a Group 6: Arts subject.

The Physics, Chemistry, Biology, and Design Technology was last updated for first teaching in September 2014, with syllabus updates (including a decrease in the number of options), a new internal assessment component similar to that of the a new internal assessment component similar to that of the Group 5 (mathematics) explorations, and "a new concept-based approach" dubbed "the nature of science". A new, standard level-only course will also be introduced to cater to candidates who do not wish to further their studies in the sciences, focusing on important concepts in Chemistry, Biology and Physics.

== 2023 syllabus update ==
The 3 core sciences namely Physics, Chemistry, and Biology, as well as Environmental Systems and Societies have been updated, with the first teaching in August 2023, and first examinations in May 2025. The syllabus change was originally scheduled for 2021, though the COVID-19 pandemic caused the IB to delay the syllabus change to 2023. Details of the specific changes can be found on the IBO website.

== Structure and assessment ==
All group 4 subjects (except computer science and environmental systems and societies; see below) follow roughly the same format. Each subject has its Subject Specific Core (SSC), i.e., material taught at both the standard and higher levels. Students sitting the Higher Level examination study the Additional Higher Level (AHL) material. Lastly, there is a list of options for each subject from which two are chosen. Higher Level students are sometimes unable to choose certain options that are available to Standard Level students because the AHL already covers it. Ideally, students choose the options based on their own abilities and preferences, but in practice the options are usually chosen by the school (based on the school's scientific facilities as well as the discretion of the instructor). Students spend one-quarter of the 150 hours of SL instruction (240 hours for HL; however, both numbers are merely recommendations and are not enforced) doing practical work in the laboratory. Group 4 subjects at the Standard Level are tailored for students who do not see themselves in further science instruction after leaving the programme.

Assessment of a Group 4 subject comprises the following:

- Internal assessment of the practical work (24%)
- Paper 1 – multiple choice questions on the SSC (20%)
- Paper 2 – free response questions on the SSC (32% at SL, 36% at HL)
- Paper 3 – free response questions on the options (24% at SL, 20% at HL)

At the Standard Level, the examinations are respectively 45 minutes, 1 hour and 15 minutes, and 1 hour long. At the Higher Level, they are 1 hour, 2 hours and 15 minutes, and 1 hour and 15 minutes long. Calculators are not permitted for Paper 1, but they (as well as a provided formula booklet and periodic table) are permitted for papers 2 and 3.

== Subjects ==
=== Physics (2009–2015) ===
==== Standard level ====
80 hours of instruction on 8 topics

- Physics and physical measurement
- Mechanics
- Thermal physics
- Oscillations and waves
- Electric currents
- Fields and forces
- Atomic and nuclear physics
- Energy, power and climate change

with 30 hours of instruction on two optional subjects:

- Sight and wave phenomena
- Quantum physics and nuclear physics
- Digital technology
- Relativity and particle physics
- Astrophysics
- Communications
- Electromagnetic Waves

and 40 hours of practical work.

==== Higher level ====
80 hours on Physics SL core subjects, with 55 hours on 6 additional topics:

- Motion in fields
- Thermal physics
- Wave phenomena
- Electromagnetic induction
- Quantum physics and nuclear physics
- Digital technology

and 45 hours of instruction on two optional subjects:

- Astrophysics
- Communications
- Electromagnetic Waves
- Relativity
- Medical Physics
- Particle Physics

and 60 hours of practical work.

=== Physics (2016–2022) ===
==== Topics ====
===== SL/HL core =====
- Topic 1: Measurements and uncertainties (5 hours)
- Topic 2: Mechanics (22 hours)
- Topic 3: Thermal physics (11 hours)
- Topic 4: Waves (15 hours)
- Topic 5: Electricity and magnetism (15 hours)
- Topic 6: Circular motion and gravitation (5 hours)
- Topic 7: Atomic, nuclear and particle physics (14 hours)
- Topic 8: Energy production (8 hours)

===== HL extension =====
- Topic 9: Wave phenomena (17 hours)
- Topic 10: Fields (11 hours)
- Topic 11: Electromagnetic induction (16 hours)
- Topic 12: Quantum and nuclear physics (16 hours)

===== Options =====
- Option A: Relativity (15/25 hours)
- Option B: Engineering physics (15/25 hours)
- Option C: Imaging (15/25 hours)
- Option D: Astrophysics (15/25 hours)

=== Physics (2023 onwards) ===
The 2023 updates to the International Baccalaureate (IB) Physics curriculum introduce a significant structural change, making it more cohesive and integrated. The new syllabus no longer distinguishes between "core" and "options," which makes it more difficult to pinpoint which topics are entirely new, slightly altered, or removed compared to the 2014 guide. This restructuring aims to provide a more unified approach to teaching physics. Some of the newly added sub-topics include Relativity, Engineering, Astrophysics, Entropy, Compton Scattering, Apparent Brightness, and Energy Resources. These changes reflect the growing importance of certain scientific fields in modern society and the relevance of physics in various technological and scientific advancements. For example, the inclusion of Relativity, Engineering, and Astrophysics highlights key concepts that have significant implications for understanding phenomena such as GPS technology, technological innovations, and the mysteries of the universe.

Along with these additions, certain topics have been removed from the curriculum. Topics such as Quarks, Capacitors, Diodes, The Weak Force, Thin Films, and Cosmology are no longer part of the syllabus. While the removal of these topics may initially seem like a loss, the revised curriculum is designed to offer a more streamlined and integrated learning experience. The new topics, particularly those related to modern physics, such as Entropy and Apparent Brightness, are considered essential for understanding contemporary scientific challenges and the evolving landscape of physics.

==== Topics ====
Content	Coverage
A. Space, time and motion	
A1. Kinematics	SL/HL
A2. Forces and momentum	SL/HL
A3. Work, energy and power	SL/HL
A4. Rigid body mechanics	HL only
A5. Galilean and special relativity	HL only
B. The particulate nature of matter	
B1. Thermal energy transfers	SL/HL
B2. Greenhouse effect	SL/HL
B3. Gas laws	SL/HL
B4. Thermodynamics	HL only
B5. Current and circuits	SL/HL
C. Wave behaviour	
C1. Simple harmonic motion	SL/HL + HL additional
C2. Wave model	SL/HL
C3. Wave phenomena	SL/HL + HL additional
C4. Standing waves and resonance	SL/HL
C5. Doppler effect	SL/HL + HL additional
D. Fields	
D1. Gravitational fields	SL/HL + HL additional
D2. Electric and magnetic fields	SL/HL + HL additional
D3. Motion in electromagnetic fields	SL/HL
D4. Induction	HL only
E. Nuclear and quantum physics	
E1. Structure of the atom	SL/HL + HL additional
E2. Quantum physics	HL only
E3. Radioactive decay	SL/HL + HL additional
E4. Fission	SL/HL
E5. Fusion and stars	SL/HL
Experimental programme	
Practical work	SL/HL
Collaborative sciences project	SL/HL
Scientific investigation	SL/HL

=== Chemistry (2009–2015) ===
==== Standard level ====
80 hours of instruction on the topics:

- Quantitative Chemistry
- Atomic structure
- Periodicity
- Bonding
- Energetics
- Kinetics
- Equilibrium
- Acids and Bases
- Oxidation and reduction
- Organic chemistry
- Measurement and data processing

and 30 hours on two options from the topics:

- Modern analytical chemistry
- Human Biochemistry
- Chemistry in industry and technology
- Medicines and drugs
- Environmental Chemistry
- Food chemistry
- Further Organic Chemistry

together with 40 hours of practical work.

==== Higher level ====
80 hours on the core subjects of the Standard level course with 55 hours of instruction on these topics:

- Atomic structure
- Periodicity
- Bonding
- Energetics
- Kinetics
- Equilibrium
- Acids and Bases
- Oxidation and reduction
- Organic chemistry

and 45 hours on two of the options in the standard course, and 60 hours of practical work.

=== Chemistry (2016–2022) ===
==== Topics ====
===== SL/HL core and HL extension =====
- Topic 1: Stoichiometric relationships (13.5 hours)
- Topic 2 + 12: Atomic structure (6/8 hours)
- Topic 3 + 13: Periodicity (6/10 hours)
- Topic 4 + 14: Chemical bonding and structure (13.5/20.5 hours)
- Topic 5 + 15: Energetics/thermochemistry (9/16 hours)
- Topic 6 + 16: Chemical kinetics (7/13 hours)
- Topic 7 + 17: Equilibrium (4.5/8.5 hours)
- Topic 8 + 18: Acids and bases (6.5/16.5 hours)
- Topic 9 + 19: Redox processes (8/14 hours)
- Topic 10 + 20: Organic chemistry (11/23 hours)
- Topic 11 + 21: Measurement and data processing (10/12 hours)

===== Options =====
- Option A: Materials (15/25 hours)
- Option B: Biochemistry (15/25 hours)
- Option C: Energy (15/25 hours)
- Option D: Medicinal chemistry (15/25 hours)

=== Chemistry (2023 onwards) ===
==== Topics ====
Content	Coverage
Structure 1. Models of the particulate nature of matter	
Structure 1.1 - Introduction to the particulate nature of matter	SL/HL
Structure 1.2 - The nuclear atom	SL/HL
Structure 1.3 - Electron configurations	SL/HL
Structure 1.4 - Counting particles by mass: The mole	SL/HL
Structure 1.5 - Ideal gases	SL/HL
Structure 2. Models of bonding and structure	
Structure 2.1 - The ionic model	SL/HL
Structure 2.2 - The covalent model	SL/HL
Structure 2.3 - The metallic model	SL/HL
Structure 2.4 - From models to materials	SL/HL
Structure 3. Classification of matter	
Structure 3.1 - The periodic table: Classification of elements	SL/HL
Structure 3.2 - Functional groups: Classification of organic compounds	SL/HL
Reactivity 1. What drives chemical reactions?	
Reactivity 1.1 - Measuring enthalpy change	SL/HL
Reactivity 1.2 - Energy cycles in reactions	SL/HL
Reactivity 1.3 - Energy from fuels	SL/HL
Reactivity 1.4 - Entropy and spontaneity	SL/HL + HL additional
Reactivity 2. How much, how fast and how far?	
Reactivity 2.1 - How much? The amount of chemical change	SL/HL
Reactivity 2.2 - How fast? The rate of chemical change	SL/HL
Reactivity 2.3 - How far? The extent of chemical change	SL/HL
Reactivity 3. What are the mechanisms of chemical change?	
Reactivity 3.1 - Proton transfer reactions	SL/HL
Reactivity 3.2 - Electron transfer reactions	SL/HL
Reactivity 3.3 - Electron sharing reactions	SL/HL
Reactivity 3.4 - Electron-pair sharing reactions	SL/HL
Experimental programme	
Practical work	SL/HL
Collaborative sciences project	SL/HL
Scientific investigation	SL/HL

=== Biology (2009–2015) ===
Biology is the science of life and living organisms. Aside from instruction relevant to this, students are given the chance to learn complex laboratory techniques (e.g., DNA extraction) as well as develop mindful opinions about controversial topics in biology (e.g., stem-cell research and genetic modification). The syllabus lists thirteen topics, to be covered in an order varying from school to school:

==== Standard level ====
80 hours of instruction on 6 topics

- Statistical Analysis
- Cells
- Chemistry of Life
- Genetics
- Ecology and evolution
- Health and human physiology

with 30 hours of instruction on two options from:

- Human nutrition and health
- Physiology of exercise
- Cells and energy
- Evolution
- Neurobiology and behavior
- Microbes and Biotechnology
- Ecology and conservation

==== Higher level ====
80 hours of instruction on 6 topics in the standard course and 55 hours on a further 5 topics:

- Nucleic acids and proteins
- Cellular respiration and photosynthesis
- Plant Science
- Genetics
- Human health and physiology

with 45 hours of instruction on addition topics in the SL course plus:

- Further human physiology

=== Biology (2016–2022) ===
==== Topics ====
===== SL/HL core =====
- Topic 1: Cell biology (15 hours)
- Topic 2: Molecular biology (21 hours)
- Topic 3: Genetics (15 hours)
- Topic 4: Ecology (12 hours)
- Topic 5: Evolution and biodiversity (12 hours)
- Topic 6: Human physiology (20 hours)

===== HL extension =====
- Topic 7: Nucleic acids (9 hours)
- Topic 8: Metabolism, cell respiration and photosynthesis (14 hours)
- Topic 9: Plant biology (13 hours)
- Topic 10: Genetics and evolution (8 hours)
- Topic 11: Animal physiology (16 hours)

===== Options =====
- Option A: Neurology and behaviour (15/25 hours)
- Option B: Biotechnology and bioinformatics (15/25 hours)
- Option C: Ecology and conservation (15/25 hours)
- Option D: Human physiology (15/25 hours)

=== Biology (2023 onwards) ===
==== Topics ====
Content	Coverage
Unity and diversity	
• Water	SL/HL
• Nucleic acids	SL/HL
• Origins of cells	HL only
• Cell structure	SL/HL
• Viruses	HL only
• Diversity of organisms	SL/HL
• Classification and cladistics	HL only
• Evolution and speciation	SL/HL
• Conservation of biodiversity	SL/HL
Form and function	
• Carbohydrates and lipids	SL/HL
• Proteins	SL/HL
• Membranes and membrane transport	SL/HL
• Organelles and compartmentalization	SL/HL
• Cell specialization	SL/HL
• Gas exchange	SL/HL
• Transport	SL/HL
• Muscle and motility	HL only
• Adaptation to environment	SL/HL
• Ecological niches	SL/HL
Interaction and interdependence	
• Enzymes and metabolism	SL/HL
• Cell respiration	SL/HL
• Photosynthesis	SL/HL
• Chemical signalling	HL only
• Neural signalling	SL/HL
• Integration of body systems	SL/HL
• Defense against disease	SL/HL
• Populations and communities	SL/HL
• Transfer of energy and matter	SL/HL
Continuity and change	
• DNA replication	SL/HL
• Protein synthesis	SL/HL
• Mutations and gene editing	SL/HL
• Cell and nuclear division	SL/HL
• Gene expression	HL only
• Water potential	SL/HL
• Reproduction	SL/HL
• Inheritance	SL/HL
• Homeostasis	SL/HL
• Natural selection	SL/HL
• Sustainability and change	SL/HL
• Climate change	SL/HL
Experimental programme	
Practical work	SL/HL
Collaborative sciences project	SL/HL
Scientific investigation	SL/HL

=== Design technology (2009–2015) ===
Topics addressed in this course include:

- Design process
- Product innovation
- Green design
- Materials
- Product development
- Product design
- Evaluation

with additional topics in the higher level:

- Energy
- Structures
- Mechanical design
- Advanced manufacturing techniques
- Sustainable development.

=== Design technology (2016–2022) ===
==== Topics ====
===== SL/HL core =====
- Topic 1: Human factors and ergonomics (12 hours)
- Topic 2: Resource management and sustainable production (22 hours)
- Topic 3: Modelling (12 hours)
- Topic 4: Raw material to final product (23 hours)
- Topic 5: Innovation and design (13 hours)
- Topic 6: Classic design (8 hours)

===== HL extension =====
- Topic 7: User-centred design (UCD) (12 hours)
- Topic 8: Sustainability (14 hours)
- Topic 9: Innovation and markets (13 hours)
- Topic 10: Commercial production (15 hours)

=== Sport, exercise and health science (2014–2020) ===
==== Topics ====
===== Core =====
All candidates study the 6 core topics (80 hours):

- Topic 1: Anatomy (7 hours)
- Topic 2: Exercise physiology (17 hours)
- Topic 3: Energy systems (13 hours)
- Topic 4: Movement analysis (15 hours)
- Topic 5: Skill in sport (15 hours)
- Topic 6: Measurement and evaluation of human performance (13 hours)

===== Options =====
In addition, they also study two of the following four options (30 hours):

- Option A: Optimizing physiological performance (15 hours)
- Option B: Psychology of sport (15 hours)
- Option C: Physical activity and health (15 hours)
- Option D: Nutrition for sport, exercise and health (15 hours)

=== Environmental systems and societies (2010–2016) ===
==== Topics ====
All topics are compulsory (i.e. there are no options).

- Topic 1: Systems and models (5 hours)
- Topic 2: The ecosystem (31 hours)
- Topic 3: Human population, carrying capacity and resource use (39 hours)
- Topic 4: Conservation and biodiversity (15 hours)
- Topic 5: Pollution management (18 hours)
- Topic 6: The issue of global warming (6 hours)
- Topic 7: Environmental value systems (6 hours)

The remaining 30 hours are derived from the internal assessment (practical work), making a total of 150 teaching hours.

==== Assessment ====
There are two external assessment components and one internal assessment component.

===== External assessment =====
Calculators are required for both papers.

- Paper 1 (45 raw marks contributing 30% of the course, 1 hour) consists of short-answer and data-based questions.
- Paper 2 (65 raw marks contributing 50% of the course, 2 hours) consists of:
  - Section A: Candidates are required to analyse and make reasoned and balanced judgements relating to a range of data on a specific unseen case study.
  - Section B: Candidates are required to answer two structured essay questions from a choice of four.

===== Internal assessment =====
Candidates will need to complete 30 hours of practical work throughout the course. Each of the three criteria - planning (Pl), data collection and processing (DCP) and discussion, evaluation and conclusion (DEC) - are assessed twice, while the fourth criterion - personal skills (PS) - is assessed summatively throughout the course. The maximum raw mark is 42, which contributes 20% of the course.

=== Computer science (2014–2020) ===
The computer science course was recently updated and moved from Group 5 (as an elective course) to Group 4, becoming a full course, from first examinations in 2014. The structure and assessment of the course has changed to greater emphasize problem solving rather than Java program construction. The curriculum model for the course still differs from other Group 4 subjects however.

==== Topics ====
Standard Level candidates study the SL/HL core (80 hours) and the core of one option (30 hours), while Higher Level candidates study the SL/HL core (80 hours), HL extension (45 hours), an annually-issued case study (30 hours) and the whole of one option (30 + 15 hours). The remaining 40 hours for both Standard and Higher Level comes from the internal assessment component, for a total of 150 teaching hours at SL and 240 hours at HL.

===== SL/HL core =====
- Topic 1: System fundamentals (20 hours)
- Topic 2: Computer organization (6 hours)
- Topic 3: Networks (9 hours)
- Topic 4: Computational thinking, problem-solving and programming (45 hours)

===== HL extension =====
- Topic 5: Abstract data structures (23 hours)
- Topic 6: Resource management (8 hours)
- Topic 7: Control (14 hours)

===== Options =====
- Option A: Databases (30/45 hours)
- Option B: Modelling and simulation (30/45 hours)
- Option C: Web science (30/45 hours)
- Option D: Object-oriented programming (30/45 hours)

==== Assessment ====
There are three external assessment components and two internal assessment components.

===== External assessment =====
Unlike other Group 4 subjects, calculators are not permitted in any computer science examination.

- Paper 1 (SL: 70 raw marks contributing 45% of the course, 1 hour 30 minutes; HL: 100 raw marks contributing 40% of the course, 2 hours 10 minutes) consists of:
  - Section A (about 30 minutes): Compulsory short answer questions on the SL/HL core and (for HL) the HL extension. Some questions are common to HL and SL. The maximum raw mark for this section is 25.
  - Section B (60 minutes for SL, 100 minutes for HL): 3 (SL) or 5 (HL) compulsory structured questions on the SL/HL core and the HL extension. Some questions may be common to HL and SL. The maximum raw marks for this section is 45 (SL) or 75 (HL).
- Paper 2 (SL: 45 raw marks contributing 25% of the course, 1 hour; HL: 65 raw marks contributing 20% of the course, 1 hour 20 minutes) consists of 2 to 5 (SL) or 3 to 7 (HL) compulsory questions based on the option studied. For HL, questions in section A (45 marks) consists of the core of the option, which may be common to the SL paper, and questions in section B (20 marks) are based on the extension of the option.
- Paper 3 (HL only: 30 raw marks contributing 20% of the course, 1 hour) consists of 4 compulsory questions based on the pre-seen case study annually issued by the IBO.

===== Internal assessment =====
Both SL and HL candidates must complete the following:

- A computational solution (30 hours, 34 raw marks). Candidates will need to develop a solution for a client to a problem or an unanswered question. This can be in the form of an entirely new system, or an addition of functionality to an existing system. Candidates will need to select, identify and work closely with an adviser, a third-party that can assist the candidate throughout the creation of the product. Candidates will need to complete an electronic HTML cover sheet (not assessed), the product and the documentation of the product (maximum 2000 words in total), including a 2 to 7-minute video showing the functionality of the product. The entire solution and documentation is marked against 5 criteria and is digitally compressed in a ZIP file and submitted for moderation.
- The group 4 project (10 hours, 6 raw marks). Candidates will need to complete an interdisciplinary project with other science students. This is marked against the personal skills criterion.

Both components carry a weightage of 30% (SL) or 20% (HL) of the computer science course.

== Collaborative Sciences Project ==
All students of the Diploma Programme in any of these subjects, with the exception of environmental systems and societies, were compulsorily to complete an inter-disciplinary and collaborative investigation called the Group 4 project(now called the Collaborative Sciences Project), which, from the last syllabus revision of 2015, is no longer required. The Group 4 project assessment used to be included in the internal assessment marks. Students undertaking two or more group 4 courses will obtained the same mark for all of the courses.

In 2024, the Group 4 Project was renamed into the Collaborative Sciences Project. While it remains a requirement for Diploma Programme candidates, it is no longer graded. Instead, students are asked to submit a brief 100 word reflection of upon its completion, focusing on their personal experience, the collaborative process, and the skills gained.

== Differences with AP course content ==
While AP Physics C is specifically calculus-based, the IB Physics SL and HL courses primarily utilize algebra and trigonometry.
