= IB Group 3 subjects =

Subject group in the International Baccalaureate program

The Group 3: Individuals and societies subjects of the IB Diploma Programme consist of ten courses offered at both the Standard level (SL) and Higher level (HL): Business Management, Economics, Geography, Global Politics, History, Digital Society, Philosophy, Psychology, Social and cultural anthropology, and World Religions (SL only). There is also a cross-disciplinary course, Environmental systems and societies (ESS), that satisfies Diploma requirements for both Groups 3 and 4.

== History ==
History is the process of recording, reconstructing and interpreting the past through investigation of sources. IBDP History teaches candidates to interpret and critically evaluate these sources and allows them to understand and appreciate the culture and context of those living in other periods of time.

=== SL/HL core ===
All candidates must study one prescribed subject and two topics for 150 hours.

==== Prescribed subjects (40 hours) ====
The Paper 1 Prescribed subjects are two case studies and lead to the source-based Paper 1 examination.

- Military Leaders
- Conquest and its impact
- The move to global war
- Rights and Protest
- Conflict and Intervention

==== World History Topics (90 hours) ====
All candidates must study two World history topics (45 hours each), which are tested in Paper 2.

===== Topics =====
- Society and economy (750-1400)
- Causes and effects of medieval wars (750-1500)
- Dynasties and rulers (750-1500)
- Societies in transition (1400-1700)
- Early Modern states (1450-1789)
- Causes and effects of Early Modern Wars (1500-1750)
- Origins, development, and impact of industrialization (1750-2005)
- Independence movements (1800-2000)
- Evolution and development of democratic states (1848-2000)
- Authoritarian States (20th Century)
- Causes and effects of 20th Century wars
- The Cold War: Superpower tensions and rivalries (20th Century)

==== HL options (90 hours) ====
HL candidates must study one option from the following for 90 hours, tested in Paper 3. Each option has twelve sections. Candidates must study three sections.

- History of Africa and the Middle East
- History of the Americas
- History of Asia and Oceania
- History of Europe

The remaining 20 hours for both SL and HL candidates come from the internal assessment component, making a total of 150 teaching hours for SL and 240 hours for HL.

=== Assessment ===
There are three assessment components at SL and four at HL.

==== External assessment ====
- Paper 1 (25 marks weighted at 30% for SL and 20% for HL, 1 hour) - Candidates answer four structured, short-answer questions on the prescribed subject studied. This paper is common to both SL and HL.
- Paper 2 (30 marks weighed at 45% for SL and 25% for HL, 1 hour 30 minutes) - Candidates must answer two extended response questions, one on each topic studied. Each topic has a selection of 6 questions. This paper is common to both SL and HL.
- Paper 3 (HL only: 45 marks weighed at 35% of the course, 2 hours 15 minutes) - Candidates must answer three extended response questions. There are two questions set for each section. Each option has a separate examination paper.

External assessment accounts for 75% of the course grade at SL and 80% at HL.

==== Internal assessment ====
- Historical investigation (25 marks weighed at 25% for SL and 20% for HL, 20 hours) - Candidates research and write a historical investigation of 1500 to 2000 words. The topic can be freely chosen from any part of the syllabus. The investigation is internally marked and externally assessed by the International Baccalaureate.

Internal assessment accounts for the remaining 25% of the course grade at SL and 20% at HL.

== Economics SL & HL (2022) ==
The syllabus of the Economics course is divided into three main sections – microeconomics, macroeconomics, and global economics – all of which receive approximately equal weight. All sections must be studied by all candidates, and questions of all will be posed in examinations. The Diploma programme Economics course is noted for focusing more on development than any other economics course at a pre-university level, and this is all part of the IB programmes' international perspective.

=== Syllabus ===
==== Unit 1, Introduction ====
- 1.1 What is economics?
- 1.2 How economists approach the world

==== Unit 2, Microeconomics ====
- 2.1 Demand
- 2.2 Supply
- 2.3 Market equilibrium
- 2.4 Critique of maximising behaviour (HL only)
- 2.5 Demand elasticity
- 2.6 Supply elasticity
- 2.7 Role of government in microeconomics
- 2.8 Externalities and common pool resources
- 2.9 Public goods
- 2.10 Asymmetric information (HL only)
- 2.11 Market power (HL only)
- 2.12 The market's inability to achieve equity (HL only)

==== Unit 3, Macroeconomics ====
- 3.1 Measuring economic activity
- 3.2 Aggregate demand and aggregate supply
- 3.3 Macroeconomic objectives
- 3.4 Inequality and poverty
- 3.5 Monetary policy
- 3.6 Fiscal policy
- 3.7 Supply-side policy

==== Unit 4, Global economics ====
- 4.1 Benefits of international trade
- 4.2 Types of trade protection
- 4.3 Arguments for and against trade control/protection
- 4.4 Economic integration
- 4.5 Exchange rates
- 4.6 Balance of payments
- 4.7 Sustainable development
- 4.8 Measuring development
- 4.9 Barriers to economic growth and/or economic development
- 4.10 Economic growth and/or economic development strategies

The final exams consist of three papers for HL and two for SL. There have been changes to both the external and internal assessments starting with the 2022 examination period. Paper 1 consists of one prompt from each of Microeconomics, Macroeconomics and Global Economics. Students choose and write on one of the prompts only. Each question is divided into two sections, with part (a) being worth 10 points and part (b) being worth 15, involving real world examples (RWEs). Paper 2 involves answering one of two data response questions. Each question pulls material from any of the three sections of the course. Paper 2 is worth 40 points. Paper 3 is for HL students only, and is calculation based, with two mandatory questions that involve all sections of the course. The economics internal assessment (IA) includes three commentaries on current news items (no further than 1 year back) involving the use of one of the 9 economic concepts and terminology. The time allowed for each exam is a strict limit of 75 minutes each for Paper 1 and 105 minutes for Paper 2 and Paper 3.

=== Concepts ===
- Scarcity: all resources are finite, but human needs are infinite.
- Choice: how societies choose to allocate said scarce resources.
- Efficiency: making the best use of said scarce resources.
- Equity: the fairness in distribution of wealth and income.
- Economic well-being: the overall prosperity and quality of life of citizens of a country.
- Sustainability: how to meet present needs without compromising future generations (as resources are scarce).
- Change: the continuous shifts in economic variables and theories.
- Interdependence: oligopolies! (and more).
- Intervention: government involvement in correction of market failures and inequalities.

== Psychology SL & HL ==
The focus of this course is the systematic study of behavior and mental process. The program studies three main perspectives as influences on human behavior: the biological, the cognitive and the sociocultural. It includes the examination of optional topics that include health psychology, abnormal psychology, developmental psychology, sports psychology and psychology of human relationships. Finally all students have to carry out their own experimental study as an internal assessment. Students at higher level study two options whereas standard level students study only one.

Each of the perspectives should be explored using the following four compulsory topics:

- development and cultural contexts
- framework
- methodologies
- application.

The aims of the psychology course at HL and at SL are to:

- interpret and/or conduct psychological research to apply the resulting knowledge for the benefit of human beings
- ensure that ethical practices and responsibilities are implemented in psychological inquiry
- develop an understanding of the biological, social and cultural influences on human behaviour
- develop an understanding of different theoretical processes that are used to interpret behaviour, and to be aware of how these processes lead to the construction and evaluation of psychological theories
- develop an awareness of how applications of psychology in everyday life are derived from psychological theories
- develop an appreciation of the eclectic nature of psychology
- understand and/or use diverse methods of psychological inquiry.

First, students must choose an experiment to replicate. When conducting the experiment, the IB demands that certain ethical guidelines be followed. After the experiment has been completed, a written report must be produced detailing the experiment. The students are required to The external assessment, which is administered in May or November; the second year of the course is specially focused to the development of this assessment where the students are introduced to a variety of studies and the student is expected to draw connections between them. The test is divided into two parts, which are referred to as "papers". Using the internal and external assessment, IB calculates a grade value of one through seven.

== Philosophy SL & HL ==
Philosophy is offered both as a standard and higher level Group 3 subject. It consists of both internal assignment (philosophical approach to an essay on current topic) and 2 (3 on higher level) externally assessed exam papers on core and optional topics.

=== Syllabus ===
==== SL/HL core: Being Human ====
All students study the core theme which consists of six key concepts:

- Identity
- Personhood
- Freedom
- Mind and body
- The self and the other
- Human Nature

==== Options ====
SL students are required to study one theme from the following list. HL students are required to study two themes from the following list.

- 1. Aesthetics
- 2. Epistemology
- 3. Ethics
- 4. Philosophy and contemporary society
- 5. Philosophy of religion
- 6. Philosophy of science
- 7. Political philosophy

==== Prescribed Text ====
All students are required to study one text from the “IB list of prescribed philosophical texts” shown below:

- The Second Sex by Simone de Beauvoir
- Meditations by René Descartes
- Dialogues Concerning Natural Religion by David Hume
- On Liberty by John Stuart Mill
- On the Genealogy of Morality by Friedrich Nietzsche
- Creating Capabilities by Martha Nussbaum
- The Origin of Philosophy by José Ortega y Gasset
- The Republic by Plato
- The Life You Can Save by Peter Singer
- The Ethics of Authenticity by Charles Taylor
- Tao Te Ching by Laozi
- Zhuangzi by Zhuangzi

==== HL extension: Exploring philosophical activity ====
- HL students are required to undertake a deeper exploration of the nature, function, meaning and methodology of philosophy.

=== Assessment ===
==== Internal assessment ====
- SL and HL students are required to produce a philosophical analysis of a non-philosophical stimulus such as a poem, film scene, or painting.

== Information technology in a global society (ITGS) SL & HL (final assessment in May 2023, now known as Digital Society (reworked syllabus)) ==
The IB Diploma Programme information technology in a global society (ITGS) course is the study and evaluation of the impacts of information technology (IT) on individuals and society. It explores the advantages and disadvantages of the access and use of digitized information at the local and global level. ITGS provides a framework for the student to make informed judgments and decisions about the use of IT within social contexts.

Requirements for SL :

- External assessment: 2 exam papers (3 hours), counts 70% of the final mark
- Internal assessment SL 30%: The requirement of the project is to develop an original IT solution to a real problem for a specified client.

Requirements for HL:

- External assessment: 3 exam papers (4.45 hours), counts 80% of the final mark
- Internal assessment HL 20%: The requirement of the project is to develop an original IT solution to a real problem for a specified client.

Practical computer work is conducted while researching for the project at Standard Level. As of exams starting in 2012 both HL and Sl students will take the Project.

== Geography (2011-2017) ==
Geography involves the study and investigation of human relationships with the environment.

=== Syllabus ===
SL candidates study three themes - the core theme and two optional themes, while HL candidates study five themes - the core theme, three optional themes and the HL extension.

==== SL/HL core ====
All candidates must study this theme.

Theme: Patterns and change (70 hours)

- Topic 1: Populations in transition (19 hours)
- Topic 2: Disparities in wealth and development (16 hours)
- Topic 3: Patterns in environmental quality and sustainability (19 hours)
- Topic 4: Patterns in resource consumption (16 hours)

==== Options ====
SL candidates must study two of the following seven themes (60 hours), while HL candidates must study three (90 hours). Teachers may teach more themes than prescribed so that the candidates have a greater freedom of choice in Paper 2, since all options are set on the same paper.

- Option A: Freshwater - issues and conflicts (30 hours)
- Option B: Oceans and their coastal margins (30 hours)
- Option C: Extreme environments (30 hours)
- Option D: Hazards and disasters - risk assessment and response (30 hours)
- Option E: Leisure, sport and tourism (30 hours)
- Option F: The geography of food and health (30 hours)
- Option G: Urban environments (30 hours)

==== HL extension ====
HL candidates must study this theme.

Theme: Global interactions (60 hours)

- Topic 1: Measuring global interactions (4 hours)
- Topic 2: Changing space - the shrinking world (12 hours)
- Topic 3: Economic interactions and flows (8 hours)
- Topic 4: Environmental change (8 hours)
- Topic 5: Sociocultural exchanges (8 hours)
- Topic 6: Political outcomes (10 hours)
- Topic 7: Global interactions at the local level (10 hours)

=== Assessment ===
There are three assessment components at SL and four at HL.

==== External assessment ====
- Paper 1 (60 marks weighing 40% of the course for SL and 25% for HL, 1 hour 30 minutes) - Both SL and HL candidates sit the same paper assessing their knowledge on the core theme.
  - Section A (45 marks; questions 1-4) consists of four compulsory short-answer questions, one on each of the four topics in the theme. Command terms indicate the depth of the answer required (e.g. evaluate indicates that more depth is required than define).
  - Section B (15 marks; questions 5-7) consists of three extended response questions that require more in-depth treatment than in Section A, and are required to answer one. Questions are based on the core theme but may link with the optional themes as well.
- Paper 2 (40 marks at SL and 60 marks at HL, both weighed to 35%, 1 hour 20 minutes at SL, 2 hours at HL) - This paper assesses knowledge on the optional themes studied. Essentially, SL and HL students sit the same paper except that SL candidates answer two questions and HL candidates answer three from the themes studied, for 20 marks each. The paper consists of 14 questions, two on each theme, and may also come with a resources booklet for certain questions. Each question has at least three parts - earlier parts are short-answer questions which may or may not require depth. The last part is a 10-mark extended response question which more depth is required.
- Paper 3 (HL only: 25 marks weighing 20% of the course, 1 hour) - HL candidates are assessed on the HL extension in this paper, but knowledge of the core theme is assumed. Students choose one question to answer out of a choice of three. Each question has two parts worth 10 and 15 marks respectively. Both parts require essay-length and in-depth writing. The first part tests understanding and application, while the second tests synthesis and evaluation.

External assessment accounts for 75% of the grade for the entire course at SL, and 80% of that at HL.

==== Internal assessment ====
- Fieldwork (30 marks weighing 25% of the course for SL and 20% for HL, 20 hours) - All candidates are required to complete a fieldwork investigation based on one or more themes in the syllabus and write a 2500-word report based on the collection of primary data, processing the data and evaluating the fieldwork. Secondary data may be collected but only play a smaller part in the fieldwork. Reports are marked according to seven criteria by the teacher and then sent for external moderation. The report demands the same from both SL and HL.

Internal assessment accounts for the remaining 25% of the grade at SL and 20% at HL.

== Business Management (2024) ==
According to the IBO, the business management course is designed to meet the current and future needs of students who want to develop their knowledge of business content, concepts and tools to assist with business decision-making. Future employees, business leaders, entrepreneurs or social entrepreneurs need to be confident, creative and compassionate as change agents for business in an increasingly interconnected global marketplace. The business management course is designed to encourage the development of these attributes.

=== Syllabus ===
==== Unit 1: Introduction to business management ====
- 1.1 What is a business
- 1.2 Types of business entities
- 1.3 Business objectives
- 1.4 Stakeholders
- 1.5 Growth and evolution
- 1.6 Multinational companies (MNCs)

==== Unit 2: Human resource management ====
- 2.1 Introduction to human resource management
- 2.2 Organisational structure
- 2.3 Leadership and management
- 2.4 Motivation and demotivation
- 2.5 Organisational (coroprate) culture (HL only)
- 2.6 Communication
- 2.7 Industrial/employee relations (HL only)

==== Unit 3: Finance and accounts ====
- 3.1 Introduction to finance
- 3.2 Sources of finance
- 3.3 Costs and revenues
- 3.4 Final accounts
- 3.5 Profitability and liquidity ratio analysis
- 3.6 Debt/equity ratio analysis (aka efficiency ratio analysis) (HL only)
- 3.7 Cash flow
- 3.8 Investment appraisal
- 3.9 Budgets (HL only)

==== Unit 4: Marketing ====
- 4.1 Introduction to marketing
- 4.2 Marketing planning
- 4.3 Sales forecasting (HL only)
- 4.4 Market research
- 4.5 The seven Ps of the marketing mix
  - 4 of the Ps are for SL and HL
  - an extra 3 for services are HL only
- International marketing (HL only)

==== Unit 5: Operations management ====
- 5.1 Introduction to operations management
- 5.2 Operations methods
- 5.3 Lean production and quality management (HL only)
- 5.4 Location
- 5.5 Break-even analysis
- 5.6 Production planning (HL only)
- 5.7 Crisis management and contingency planning (HL only)
- 5.8 Research and development (HL only)
- 5.9 Management information systems (HL only)

==== Unit 6: Business management toolkit (BMT) ====
- SWOT analysis
- Ansoff matrix
- STEEPLE analysis
- BCG matrix
- Business plan
- Decision trees
- Descriptive statistics
- Circular business models
- Force field analysis (HL only)
- Gantt chart (HL only)
- Hofstede's cultural dimensions (HL only)
- Porter's generic strategies (HL only)
- Contribution (HL only)
- Simple linear regression (HL only)
- Critical path analysis (HL only)

=== Assessment ===
==== Internal ====
In the business management IA, students produce a research project regarding a real business issue or problem facing a particular organisation through a conceptual lens.

==== External ====
- Paper 1 is based on a pre released statement that specifies the context and background of an unseen case study, describing a fictional business organisation. HL and SL have the same questions. (90 minutes)
- Paper 2 is based on unseen stimulus with a quantitative focus, requiring a calculator. Paper 2 is 90 minutes for SL and 105 minutes for HL.
  - Section A of paper 2 is made up of medium length questions, which are to be answered with reference to the provided stimulus.
  - Section B contains two questions, students choose one to answer. Section B questions are longer and require deeper analysis than section A.
- Paper 3 (HL only) is based on an unseen stimulus regarding a social enterprise. Students must identify a human need and/or challenges facing the organisation, and recommend a plan moving forward. Paper 3 is 75 minutes.

=== Concepts ===
- Sustainability
- Change
- Creativity
- Ethics

== Anticipated subjects ==
In some cases, Standard level subjects can be studied in one year, as opposed to the two years for Higher level subjects. This gives students more study time in their final year of school, as well as the option to spend more hours on their higher level subjects. All anticipated subjects are studied at standard level.

== Availability ==
Business and Management SL, Economics SL, Economics HL, ITGS SL, ITGS HL, Psychology SL and Philosophy SL are offered online to students enrolled in the IB Diploma Programme.
