= IB Diploma Programme =

Educational programme

The International Baccalaureate Diploma Programme (IBDP) is a two-year educational programme primarily aimed at 16- to 19-year-olds in 140 countries around the world. The programme provides an internationally accepted qualification for entry into higher education and is recognized by many universities worldwide. It was developed in the early-to-mid-1960s in Geneva, Switzerland, by a group of international educators. After a six-year pilot programme that ended in 1975, a bilingual diploma was established.

Administered by the International Baccalaureate (IB), the IBDP is taught in schools in over 140 countries, in one of five languages: Chinese, English, French, German, or Spanish. To offer the IB diploma, a school must be certified as an IB school. IBDP students complete assessments in six subjects, traditionally one from each of the 6 subject groups (although students may choose to forgo a Group 6 (art) subject, instead choosing an additional subject from one of the other groups barring Group 5 (mathematics). In addition, students must fulfill the three core requirements; CAS (Creativity, Activity, Service), TOK (Theory of Knowledge) and the EE (Extended Essay). Students are evaluated using both internal and external assessments, and courses finish with an externally assessed series of examinations, usually consisting of two or three timed written tests. Internal assessment varies by subject: there may be oral presentations, practical work, or written work. In most cases, these are initially graded by the classroom teacher, whose grades are then verified or modified, as necessary, by an appointed external moderator.

Generally, the IBDP has been well-received. It has been commended for introducing interdisciplinary thinking to students. In the United Kingdom, The Guardian newspaper claims that the IBDP is "more academically challenging and broader than three or four A-levels". In the May 2025 assessment session, the IB reported a Diploma Programme pass rate of 81.9%, with 83,703 diplomas awarded and 18,530 diplomas not awarded among second-year Diploma candidates.

== History and background ==
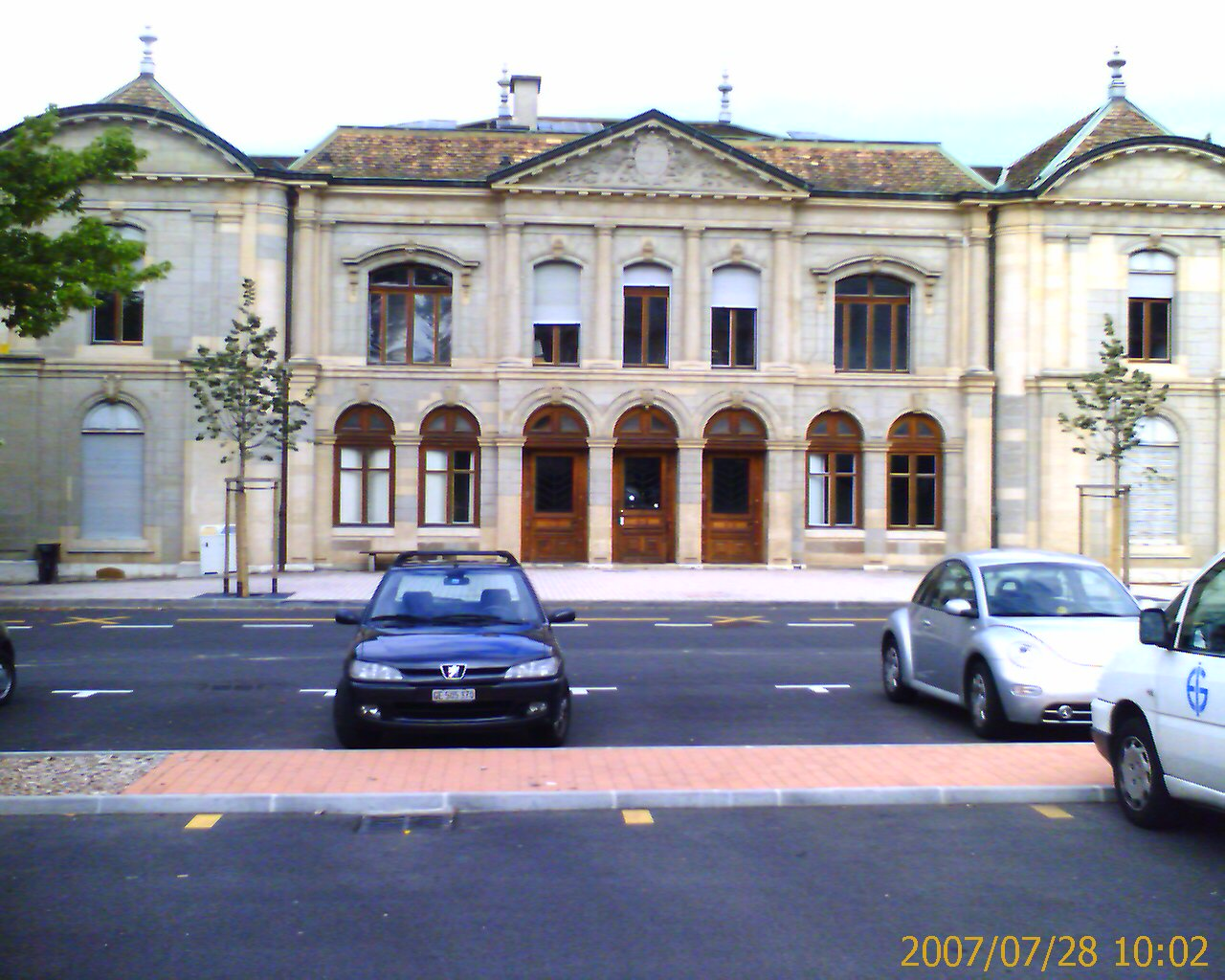
Château at Ecolint where the IB was developed

In 1945, the "Conference of Internationally-minded Schools" asked the International School of Geneva (Ecolint) to create an international schools programme. When he became director of Ecolint's English division, Desmond Cole-Baker began to develop the idea, and in 1962, his colleague Robert Leach organized a conference in Geneva, at which the term "International Baccalaureate" was first mentioned. An American social studies teacher, Leach organized the conference—with a $2500 grant from UNESCO—which was attended by observers from European schools and UNESCO. Writing about the genesis of the International Baccalaureate in Schools Across Frontiers, Alec Peterson credits Leach as "the original promoter of the International Baccalaureate." At the end of the conference, UNESCO funded the International School Association with an additional $10,000, which was inadequate to do more than produce a few papers, or bring teachers together for meetings.

By 1964, international educators such as Alec Peterson (director of the Department of Education at Oxford University), Harlan Hanson (director of the College Board Advanced Placement Program), Desmond Cole (director of United Nations International School in New York City) and Desmond Cole-Baker (head of the International School of Geneva) founded the International Schools Examination Syndicate (ISES). Cole and Hanson brought experience with college entrance examinations in the United States, and Hanson, in particular, brought his experience from a long relationship with the College Board. According to Peterson, "the breakthrough in the history of the IB" came in 1965 with a grant from the Twentieth Century Fund, which commissioned Martin Mayer, author of The Schools, to produce a report on the feasibility of establishing a common curriculum and examination for international schools that would be acceptable for entry to universities worldwide. This led to conferences involving Ecolint, the United World College of the Atlantic (Atlantic College), and others in the spring and fall of 1965, at which details about the curriculum for the Diploma Programme were discussed and agreed upon.

The Ford Foundation grant, secured in 1966, funded Peterson's study at Oxford University, which focused on three issues: a comparative analysis of "secondary educational programmes in European countries...in cooperation with the Council of Europe"; university expectations for secondary students intending to enter university; and a "statistical comparison of IB pilot examination results with...national school leaving examinations such as British A Levels and US College Board (AP) Tests". As a result of the study and the curriculum model developed at Atlantic College, Peterson initiated the pattern of combining "general education with specialization", which melded with the curricula of the United States and Canada, and became the "curriculum framework" proposed at the UNESCO conference in Geneva in 1967. Late in 1967, ISES was restructured and renamed the IB Council of Foundation, and John Goormaghtigh became the first president in January 1968. In 1967, the group, which by then also included Ralph Tyler, identified eight schools to be used for the experimentation of the curriculum.

In 1968, the IB headquarters were officially established in Geneva for the development and maintenance of the IBDP. Alec Peterson became IBO's first director general, and in 1968, twelve schools in twelve countries participated in the IBDP, including Atlantic College in Wales, Ecolint in Geneva, and UNIS of New York City. The aim was to "provide an internationally acceptable university admissions qualification suitable for the growing mobile population of young people whose parents were part of the world of diplomacy, international and multi-national organizations."

The first six years of the IB Diploma Programme, with a limited number of students, are referred to as the "experimental period". Each school was to be inspected by ISES or IBO and had to be approved by their government. The experimental period ended in 1975, and in that year, the International Baccalaureate North America (IBNA) was established as a separate entity, allowing the funding for implementation of the IBDP to remain in the country rather than being sent to Geneva. The first official guide to the programme containing its syllabus and official assessment information was published in 1970 and included the theory of knowledge course. The extended essay was introduced in 1978, but creativity, action, service (CAS), although mentioned in guides beforehand, was not specifically identified in the guide until 1989.

In 1980, responding to criticism that the "internationalism" was Eurocentric, the IB hosted a seminar in Singapore with the goal of incorporating Asian culture and education into the IB curriculum. In 1982, the Standing Conference of Heads of IB Schools took steps to modify the Eurocentrism in the curriculum. The same year, the Japanese government hosted a science conference for IBO "as a token of Japanese interest in the various dimensions of the IB".

From the start, all subjects of the IB Diploma Programme were available in English and French, and it was mandatory for all students to study both a first and a second language. In 1974, bilingual diplomas were introduced that allowed students to take one or more of their humanities or science subjects in a language other than their first. The IB Diploma Programme subjects became available in Spanish in 1983.

== Core requirements and subject groups ==
=== Core requirements ===
To be awarded an IB diploma, candidates must fulfill three core requirements, in addition to passing their subject examinations:

- Extended essay (EE). Candidates must write an independent research essay of up to 4,000 words on a subject from the list of approved EE subjects. The candidate may choose to investigate a topic within a subject they are currently studying, although this is not required. The EE may be written on an interdisciplinary topic.
- Theory of knowledge (TOK). This course introduces students to theories about the nature and limitations of knowledge (basic epistemology) and provides practice in determining the meaning and validity of knowledge (critical thinking). It is claimed to be a "flagship element" of the Diploma Programme, and is the one course that all diploma candidates are required to take. TOK requires 100 hours of instruction, the completion of an externally assessed essay of 1600 words (from a choice of six titles prescribed by the IB worth 67%), and an internally assessed exhibition or presentation (worth 33%) on the candidate's chosen topic.
- Creativity, activity, service (CAS). CAS aims to provide students with opportunities for personal growth, self-reflection, intellectual, physical and creative challenges, and awareness of themselves as responsible members of their communities through participation in social or community work (service), athletics or other physical activities (activity), and creative activities (creativity). The guideline for the minimum amount of CAS activity over the two-year programme is approximately 3–4 hours per week, though "hour counting" is not encouraged. Previously, there was a requirement that 150 CAS hours be completed, but this was abolished in 2010. However, some schools still require these hours.

=== Subject groups ===
Students who pursue the IB diploma must take six subjects: one each from Groups 1–5, and either one from Group 6 or a permitted substitute from one of the other groups barring Group 5, as described below. Three or four subjects must be taken at Higher level (HL) and the rest at Standard level (SL). The IB recommends a minimum of 240 hours of instructional time for HL courses and 150 hours for SL courses.

While the IB encourages students to pursue the full IB diploma, the "substantial workload require[s] a great deal of commitment, organization, and initiative". Students may instead choose to register for one or more individual IB subjects, without the core requirements. Such students will not receive the full diploma.

The six IBDP subject groups and course offerings are summarised below. More information about the subject groups and individual courses can be found at the respective subject group articles:

- Group 1: Studies in language and literature. Taken at either SL or HL, this is generally the student's native language. Three courses are available: literature (automatically available in 55 languages); language and literature (available in 17 languages); literature and performance (automatically available in English and at SL, and by special request in Spanish and French.).
- Group 2: Language acquisition. An additional language, taken at the following levels: Language B (SL or HL), or Language ab initio (SL only). Language B courses are meant for students with some prior experience in the language, while Language ab initio is meant to be taken by pupils who are complete beginners, with almost no experience. Latin and Classical Greek are also offered and may be taken at SL or HL. Following the replacement of the Language A2 option with the Group 1 Language and Literature offering for courses starting in summer 2011, the Language B syllabus was changed: the coursework is now more rigorous, and at HL, there is the compulsory study of two works of literature (although this is for comprehension rather than analysis and is only assessed through coursework). In addition, B SL students can study one of the texts as a replacement for the optional topics. Students may choose to take an additional Group 1 course in place of a Group 2 course, in which case they may be eligible for the award of a Bilingual Diploma.
- Group 3: Individuals and societies. Humanities and social sciences courses offered at both SL and HL: Business Management, Economics, Geography, History, Digital Society, Philosophy, Psychology, and Social and Cultural Anthropology and Global Politics. The course World Religions is offered at SL and the interdisciplinary course Environmental Systems and Societies is offered at SL or HL.
- Group 4: Experimental sciences. Seven courses are offered at both SL and HL: chemistry, biology, physics, design technology, computer science, Sport, Exercise and Health Science, and interdisciplinary course Environmental Systems and Societies. Another interdisciplinary course, Nature of Science, is offered at SL only.
- Group 5: Mathematics. All students hoping to graduate with an IB Diploma must take a math class, with courses available at different levels and with different focuses. There are two distinct IB Math courses, both available at standard or higher level: Mathematics: Analysis and Approaches, with an emphasis on algebraic methods, calculus, and mathematical thinking, and Mathematics: Applications and Interpretation, with an emphasis on modelling and statistics, and with a focus on using technology to solve problems with real-world applications. These curricula were introduced in major changes in 2019 and 2021, replacing the previous curricula with a new structure. Under the 2019 course changes, Further Mathematics were dropped entirely. Before 2019, of increasing difficulty, the courses offered were Mathematical Studies SL, Mathematics SL and HL, and Further Mathematics HL. The computer science elective courses were moved to Group 4 as a full course from first examinations in 2014.
- Group 6: The arts. There are five Courses offered at both SL and HL: Dance, Music, Theatre, Visual Arts, and Film. Instead of taking a Group 6 course, students may choose to take an additional course from Groups 1–4, or a school-based syllabus course approved by IB. The interdisciplinary subject literature and performance is also offered, although currently only at SL.

Environmental Systems and Societies SL or HL is an interdisciplinary course designed to meet the diploma requirements for groups 3 or 4, while literature and performance SL meets the requirements of Groups 1 or 6.

=== Online Diploma Programme and pilot courses ===
The IB is developing an online version of the IBDP and currently offers several online courses to IBDP students. Eventually, it expects to offer online courses to any student who wishes to register. Additionally, the IB has developed pilot courses that include World Religions; Sports, Exercise and Health Sciences, Dance, and a transdisciplinary pilot course, literature and performance, Global Politics. These pilot courses have now become part of the mainstream courses.

== Assessment and awards ==
All subjects (with the exception of CAS) are evaluated using both internal and external assessors. The externally assessed examinations are given worldwide in May (usually for Northern Hemisphere schools) and in November (usually for Southern Hemisphere schools). Each exam usually consists of two or three papers, generally written on the same or successive weekdays. The different papers may have different forms of questions, or they may focus on different areas of the subject syllabus. For example, in Chemistry SL, Paper 1A has multiple choice questions, Paper 1B has data response questions, while Paper 2 has extended response questions. The grading of all external assessments is done by independent examiners appointed by the IB.

The nature of the internal assessment (IA) varies by subject. There may be oral presentations (used in languages), practical work (in experimental sciences and performing arts), or written work. Internal assessment accounts for 20 to 50 percent of the mark awarded for each subject and is marked by a teacher in the school. A sample of at least five per subject at each level from a school will also be graded by a moderator appointed by the IB, in a process called external moderation of internal assessment. Based on this moderation, the grades of the whole subject from that school will change.

Points are awarded from 1 to 7, with 7 being equivalent to an A-level grade of A*, 6 equal to A, and so on. Up to three additional points are awarded depending on the grades achieved in the extended essay and theory of knowledge, so the maximum possible point total in the IBDP is 45. The global pass rate for the IB diploma is approximately 80%. In order to receive an IB diploma, candidates must receive a minimum of 24 points or an average of four (or C) out of a possible seven points for six subjects. Candidates must also receive a minimum of 12 points from their Higher Level subjects and a minimum of 9 points from their Standard Level subjects. Additionally, candidates must complete all of the requirements for the EE, CAS and TOK. Failing conditions that will prevent a student from being awarded a diploma, regardless of points received, are non-completion of CAS, more than three scores of 3 or below (HL or SL), more than two scores of 2 or below (HL or SL), a score of 1 in any subject (HL or SL), not meeting the specific points required for Higher Level (12) or Standard Level (9) subjects, grade "E" awarded for theory of knowledge and/or the extended essay, or a penalty for academic misconduct from the Final Award Committee.

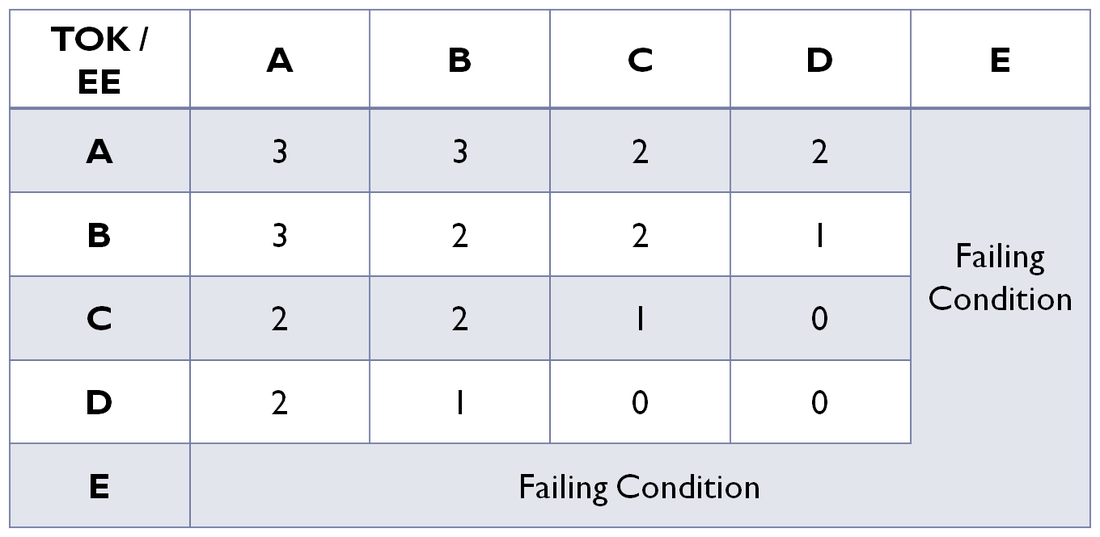
EE/TOK matrix for the 3 extra points. Top row is the EE grade, leftmost column is the TOK grade.

Candidates who successfully complete all the requirements of the IB Diploma Programme and one or more of the following combinations are eligible to receive a bilingual diploma: two Group 1 subjects (of different languages), a Group 3 or 4 subject taken in a language other than the candidate's Group 1 language, or an Extended Essay in a Group 3 or Group 4 subject written in a language other than the candidate's Group 1 language. IB transcripts are issued to indicate completion of diploma courses and exams for non-diploma candidate students.

=== Special circumstances ===
Where standard assessment conditions could put a student with special educational needs at a disadvantage, special arrangements may be allowed. The Candidates with Special Assessment Needs publication contains information regarding procedures and arrangements for students with special needs.

== Application and authorization ==
To offer the IB Diploma Programme, an institution must go through an application process, and during that period the teachers are trained in the IB. At the end of the application process, IB conducts an authorisation visit. Once a school is authorized to offer the programme, an annual fee ensures ongoing support from the IB, legal authorization to display the IB logo, and access to the Online Curriculum Centre (OCC) and the IB Information System (IBIS). The OCC provides information, resources, and support for IB teachers and coordinators. IBIS is a database employed by IB coordinators. Other IB fees also include student registration and individual diploma subject examination fees.

== University recognition ==
The IB diploma is accepted in 75 countries at over 2,000 universities, and the IB has a search directory on its website, although it advises students to check recognition policies directly with each university. The IB also maintains a list of universities offering scholarships to IBDP graduates under conditions specified by each institution, including 58 colleges and universities in the United States. The following is an overview of university recognition policies in various countries.

Australia	Although every university in Australia accepts the IB diploma, entry criteria differ from university to university. Some universities accept students on their IB point count, whereas others require the points to be converted. In all states and territories, this is based on the Australian Tertiary Admission Rank (ATAR) converted by their relevant state admission agencies.
Austria	It is considered a foreign secondary school leaving certificate, even if the school issuing the diploma is in the country. Admission decisions are at the discretion of higher education institutions.
Canada	IB North America publishes an IB Recognition Policy Summary for Canadian Universities.
China	The People's Republic of China does not formally accept the IB diploma for university qualification.
Finland	The IB diploma gives the same qualification for matriculation as the national matriculation examination. The core requirements differ very little, although the Finnish degree has more electives and languages are a larger part of the final grading
France	The IBDP is one of the foreign diplomas that allow students access into French universities.
Germany	Has set certain conditions for the IB diploma to be accepted. Students must have either Group 1 or 2 (or both) at HL; mathematics Standard Level minimum; and at least one science or mathematics course at Higher Level. German International Baccalaureate students in some schools are able to earn a "bilingual diploma" that gains them access to German universities; half of the classes in this programme are held in German.
Hong Kong	IB diploma students may apply to universities as non-JUPAS (Joint University Programmes Admissions System).
India	The Association of Indian Universities recognizes the IBDP as an entry qualification to all universities, provided that the applicants include a document from the IB detailing percentage equivalency and that specific course requirements for admission to medical and engineering programs are satisfied.
Italy	The Italian Ministry of Education recognizes the IB diploma as academically equivalent to the national diploma, provided the curriculum includes the Italian language and the particular IB programme is accepted for H.E.D. matriculation in Italy.
Lebanon	Certain Lebanese universities may allow an IBDP student to fully skip freshman year, starting as a sophomore.
Peru	Peruvian universities do not officially accept the IB diploma. However, the Ministry of Education may grant partial equivalence to national diploma for students who have satisfactorily completed the fourth year of high school in the country.
Philippines	Some universities in the Philippines accept the IB diploma in lieu of taking the entrance exams.
Russia	According to the IB, there are two universities in Russia that officially recognize the IB diploma subject to certain guidelines. The Russian Ministry of Education considers the IB diploma issued by state-accredited IB schools in Russia equivalent to the certificate of secondary (complete) general education (attestat).
Spain	Considers the IB diploma academically equivalent to the "Título de bachillerato español". As of 1 June 2008, IB diploma holders no longer need to pass the University Entrance Examination to be admitted to Spanish universities.
Sweden	IB diploma grades can be converted to a Swedish grade equivalent. After the conversion the IB diploma is treated the same as grades from the Swedish education system.
Turkey	Turkish universities accept the IB diploma, but all applicants are required by law to take the university entrance examinations.
United Kingdom	UCAS publishes a university entrance tariff table that converts IB and other qualifications into standardised "tariff points", but these are not binding, so institutions are free to set minimum entry requirements for IB candidates that are not the same as those for A level candidates. Most universities in the UK require IB students to take more courses than A-level students—requiring, for instance, four As and two Bs from an IB student, whereas an A-level student will only need an ABB—because each subject taken as a part of the IB gives a less broad coverage of a similar subject taken at A-level.
United States	Institutions of higher education set their own admission and credit policies for IB diploma recognition. Colorado and Texas have legislation requiring universities to adopt and implement policy which awards college credit to students who have successfully completed the IBDP.

== Reception ==
The IBDP was described as "a rigorous, off-the-shelf curriculum recognized by universities around the world" on 10 December 2006, edition of Time magazine, in an article titled "How to bring our schools out of the 20th century". It was also featured in the summer 2002 edition of American Educator, where Robert Rothman described it as "a good example of an effective, instructionally sound, exam-based system". Howard Gardner, a professor of educational psychology at Harvard University, said that the IBDP curriculum is "less parochial than most American efforts" and helps students "think critically, synthesize knowledge, reflect on their own thought processes and get their feet wet in interdisciplinary thinking". An admissions officer at Brown University has admitted the IBDP garners widespread respect.

In the United Kingdom, the IBDP is "regarded as more academically challenging but broader than three or four A-levels", according to an article in The Guardian. In 2006, government ministers provided funding so that "every local authority in England could have at least one centre offering sixth-formers the chance to do the IB".

In the United States, criticism of the IBDP has centered on the vague claim that it is anti-American, according to parents anonymously quoted in The New York Times, who objected to the program's funding from UNESCO in its early years. The base cost is considered to be higher than other programs. In 2012, the school board in Coeur d'Alene, Idaho, USA, voted to eliminate all IB programmes in the district because of low participation and high costs.

In the Asia-Pacific region, the rapid expansion of the IBDP, combined with the high-stakes nature of its assessments in highly competitive education markets, has created distinct implementation challenges. These include interpretive pressures and anxieties among teachers, a heavy reliance on informal networks and voluntary teacher contributions for professional development and assessment support, and tensions with the programme’s holistic educational aims., straining the organisation's ability to maintain consistent quality assurance and support services.

In August 2025, the Russian government designated the IBO (the IB Diploma's parent organization) "undesirable", accusing it of spreading pro-Western and anti-Russian propaganda, leading all affiliated schools in the country to stop offering the program under threat of retaliation by Russian authorities.

== See also ==
- European Baccalaureate
- International school
- List of secondary school leaving certificates
