= IB Group 5 subjects =

Subject group in the International Baccalaureate program

The Group 5: Mathematics subjects of the IB Diploma Programme consist of two different mathematics courses, both of which can be taken at Standard Level (SL) or Higher Level (HL). To earn an IB Diploma, a candidate must take either Mathematics Applications and Interpretation (SL/HL) or Mathematics Analysis and Approaches (SL/HL), as well as satisfying all CAS, TOK and EE requirements.

== Examination structure ==
At the standard level (SL), there are 2 external examinations and 1 internal examination for both of the IB math courses. At the higher level (HL), there are 3 external examinations and 1 internal examination for both of the IB math courses.

== Course syllabi ==
Both Mathematics Analysis and Approaches and Mathematics Applications and Interpretation include the following elements:

- Number and Algebra
- Functions
- Geometry and trigonometry
- Statistics and probability
- Calculus
- Proofs (HL only)
- Vectors (HL only)
