= Darwin Brown =

American football player (born 1977)

No. 41, 26
- Position: Defensive back

Personal information
- Born: July 6, 1977 (age 49); Tyler, Texas, U.S.
- Listed height: 5 ft 10 in (1.78 m)
- Listed weight: 175 lb (79 kg)

Career information
- High school: Tyler (TX) John Tyler
- College: Texas Tech
- NFL draft: 1999: 5th round, 167th overall pick

Career history
- Denver Broncos (1999)*; San Francisco 49ers (1999)*; St. Louis Rams (2001)*; → Amsterdam Admirals (2001); New York Dragons (2002)*
- * Offseason or practice squad member only

Darwin Brown (born July 6, 1977) is an American former football player. In 1999, he was drafted by the Denver Broncos in the fifth round of the 1999 NFL draft. He played college football at Texas Tech University and high school football at John Tyler High School.

He was on the John Tyler Lions high school team that went 16–0 and won the 1994 class 5A Division II state championship of Texas, a season that included a memorable regional semifinal against Plano East Senior High School.

He was a member of the St. Louis Rams team during the 2001 season but did not play in any regular season games.

Brown signed with the New York Dragons on March 20, 2002.

He later became a member of the coaching staff at Dallas Carter high school alongside his former John Tyler Lions coach Allen Wilson.
