= David Warren (American football) =

American gridiron football player (born 1978)

No. 99
- Position: Defensive end

Personal information
- Born: October 14, 1978 (age 48); Tyler, Texas, U.S.
- Listed height: 6 ft 3 in (1.91 m)
- Listed weight: 250 lb (113 kg)

Career information
- High school: Tyler (TX) John Tyler
- College: Florida State (1997–2000)
- NFL draft: 2001: undrafted

Career history
- Indianapolis Colts (2001)*; Oakland Raiders (2002)*; BC Lions (2003)
- * Offseason or practice squad member only

Awards and highlights
- BCS national champion (1999); Second-team All-ACC (2000)

David Warren (born October 14, 1978) is an American former professional Canadian football player from Tyler, Texas.

== Early life ==
As a sophomore in 1994, he played for the John Tyler High School Lions team under coach Allen Wilson, which went 16–0 and won the 5A Division II state championship in Texas. The championship run included a legendary regional semifinal game between John Tyler High School and Plano East Senior High School, in which he caught one touchdown pass on offense and scored another touchdown on defense on a fumble recovery. For the season, Warren registered 124 tackles and six sacks.

In his junior year, Warren piled up 126 tackles with 18 sacks and four blocked punts.

In 1996 while still attending John Tyler High School, he was named USA Today High School Defensive Player of the Year and the Bobby Dodd National Lineman of the Year by the Touchdown Club of Atlanta. He recorded 106 tackles and 8.5 sacks despite constant double and triple teaming during senior campaign. He also won district in the 200-meter dash while in high school.

Recruited by virtually every school in the nation, Warren decided to play for the Florida State Seminoles under Coach Bobby Bowden.

== College career ==
In his true freshman season Warren played in 11 of 12 games, appearing as back-up defensive end behind Tony Bryant and on special teams, and recorded 16 tackles (eight solo) on the year. He notched his first collegiate sack in his first game against Maryland, and tallied a season-high five tackles in the win at Duke. In Florida State's 31–14 win in the Sugar Bowl over Ohio State, Warren contributed two tackles.

As a sophomore, Warren moved in the Florida State defensive two-deep and saw playing time as back-up to Roland Seymour. He finished the year with 30 tackles, including five for loss and also added three sacks and a pass breakup. His season-best game came in the win over Southern California with four tackles, one sack, a forced fumble and two pressures.

In his junior year, Warren appeared in every game and started five including the National Championship game. He finished the season with 32 total tackles, 17 solo stops, and two sacks, while tying for the team lead with three fumbles caused and led all defensive linemen with four passes broken up.

== Professional career ==
Warren went undrafted in the 2001 NFL draft, but signed as a free agent with the Indianapolis Colts on April 27, 2001. He was later released on September 4, 2001. He was re-signed by the Colts on January 18, 2002. Warren was released again on August 26, 2002.

Warren was signed to the practice squad of the Oakland Raiders on January 15, 2003, during the playoffs. He was released in June 2003. He did not play in any regular season NFL games.

Later in 2003, Warren played in two games for the BC Lions of the Canadian Football League.

== Personal life ==
Warren suffered from neurological problems steming from a baseball incident as a teen, when a baseball caught him squarely between the eyes, knocking him unconscious. Warren had a metal plate screwed into his forehead to reinforce the area.
