= Justin Blalock =

American football player (born 1983)

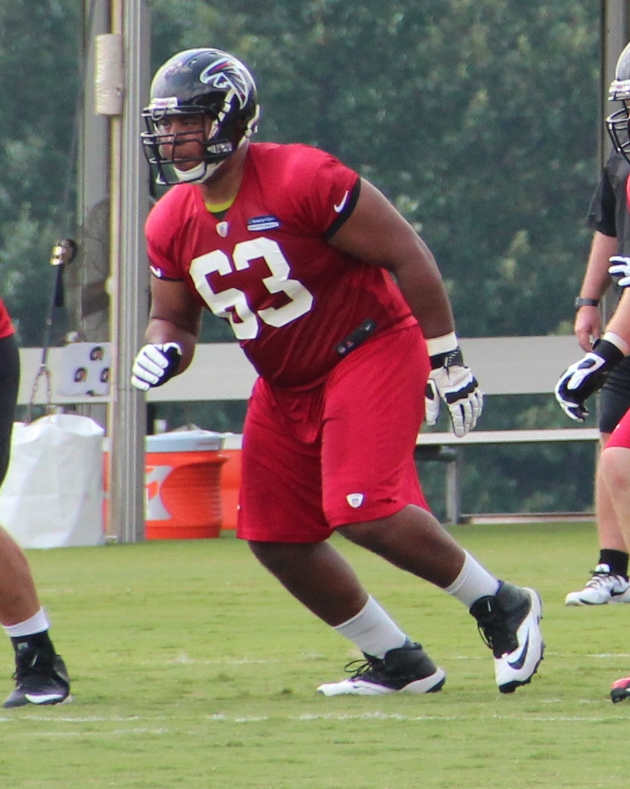
- Blalock with the Atlanta Falcons in 2013

No. 63
- Position: Offensive guard

Personal information
- Born: December 20, 1983 (age 42); Dallas, Texas, U.S.
- Listed height: 6 ft 3 in (1.91 m)
- Listed weight: 320 lb (145 kg)

Career information
- High school: Plano East (Plano, Texas)
- College: Texas (2002–2006)
- NFL draft: 2007: 2nd round, 39th overall pick

Career history
- Atlanta Falcons (2007–2014)

Awards and highlights
- BCS national champion (2005); Consensus All-American (2006); Third-team All-American (2005); Big 12 Offensive Lineman of the Year (2006); 3× First-team All-Big 12 (2004–2006)

Career NFL statistics
- Games played: 125
- Games started: 125
- Fumble recoveries: 4
- Total touchdowns: 1
- Stats at Pro Football Reference

Justin Christopher Blalock (born December 20, 1983) is an American former professional football player who was an offensive guard for eight seasons with the Atlanta Falcons of the National Football League (NFL). He played college football for the Texas Longhorns, earning consensus All-American honors. He was selected by the Falcons in the second round of the 2007 NFL draft.

== Early life ==
Blalock was born in Dallas, Texas. He attended Plano East Senior High School in the Dallas suburb of Plano. He was three-year starter at offensive guard, but also saw playing time at defensive tackle. As a sophomore in 1999, Blalock was named second-team all-district after recording 151 pancake blocks, as he helped lead Plano East to an 11–3 record and the Texas 5A Division II state quarterfinals that season. The offensive lineman was named all-district and all-area as a junior after registering 130 knockdowns. In 2001, Blalock posted 134 knockdown blocks, did not allow a sack and opened holes for an offense that averaged nearly 300 rushing yards per game. His top game of season was a 21-pancake performance vs. Plano Senior High School.

Blalock was also an outstanding track and field athlete in the shot put and discus throw, where he was selected all-state. He captured the Region II-5A shot put title with a toss of 58-8½ in 2002 and finished fourth (55-2½) at the 2002 UIL Championships (Class 5A). He also registered the third-best throw (63-2½ or 19.28m) in the state as a senior (all classes) and placed fifth in the shot (61–6) at the 1999 Texas 5A Championships.

Blalock was selected to play in the 2002 U.S. Army All-American Bowl. He also earned first-team All-American honors from USA Today as a senior, and was also a first-team Class 5A All-State, all-area and all-district selection. The Sporting News rated him as the nation's top offensive lineman prospect as well as the No. 15 high school prospect overall.

== College career ==
Blalock attended the University of Texas, where he played for coach Mack Brown's Texas Longhorns football team from 2002 to 2006. As a redshirt freshman in 2003, Blalock started all 13 games at right tackle and was named first-team Freshman All-America by the Football Writers Association of America and The Sporting News. He also started all 12 games his sophomore year at right tackle and was named first-team All-Big 12 by the Big 12 coaches and the Austin American-Statesman.

Blalock again manned the right tackle position in 2004. He was chosen first-team All-Big 12 Conference by the league's coaches and the Austin American-Statesman, adding second-team accolades from The Associated Press, Dallas Morning News, Fort Worth Star-Telegram and San Antonio Express-News. He led an offensive line that cleared the way for Texas to rank second in the nation in rushing (299.2 ypg), seventh in total offense (464.4 ypg) and 12th in scoring (35.3 ppg). Texas' 3,590 rushing yards that season was the third-highest total in school history.

As a junior in 2005, he again started all 13 games at right tackle and was named All-America by College Football News and a third-team All-America by The Associated Press. Also named first-team All-Big 12 by The Associated Press, Austin American-Statesman, Big 12 Coaches, Dallas Morning News, Fort Worth Star-Telegram and Kansas City Star. He was part of the NCAA National Championship Football team and contributed to the now legendary victory at The Rose Bowl in January 2006.

As a senior during 2006 Blalock was voted team captain and continued to lead the Texas Longhorns in exemplary leadership and athletic consistency. He was a consensus All-America choice in 2006.

On November 24, 2006, Blalock became the first Longhorn in school history to start 50 consecutive games.

An excellent student, Blalock was a member of the UT Athletics Director's Honor Roll in fall 2004. He was also one of five finalists for the 2002 Watkins Award, which is presented to the nation's top African-American high school scholar-athlete. Blalock graduated from the University of Texas at Austin in December 2006 with his degree in youth and community studies and a minor in business.

== Professional career ==
Blalock scored a 41 on the Wonderlic, the highest score of the 2007 NFL draft. He was one of seven Longhorns selected by professional football teams in the draft. The others were Michael Griffin (number 19 overall), Aaron Ross (number 20 overall), Tim Crowder (number 56 overall), Brian Robison (number 102 overall), Tarell Brown (number 147 overall), Kasey Studdard (number 183 overall). Lyle Sendlein and Selvin Young were not drafted but signed with NFL teams as free agents.

On July 31, 2011, Blalock agreed to a six-year contract extension with the Falcons.

On February 27, 2015, Blalock was released by the Falcons becoming a free agent.

On June 15, 2015, Blalock retired.

== Personal life ==
Blalock resides in Atlanta, Georgia, where he is active in community service projects. He is a cousin of New Orleans Saints center Jonathan Goodwin and NFL coach Harold Goodwin. He is also a cousin of Aubrey Gibson, shareholder/partner at the law firm Polsinelli and Kourtney Gibson, president of Loop Capital.

== See also ==
- List of Texas Longhorns football All-Americans
