= Showstopper =

Showstopper or Show Stopper may refer to:

== Film and television ==
- "The Showstopper" (BoJack Horseman)
- "Show Stopper" (CSI: Miami), an episode of the TV show
- "Show Stoppers", an episode of Garfield and Friends
- "The Show Stoppers", an episode of My Little Pony: Friendship Is Magic
- "Showstoppers" (The Simple Life episode)

== Music ==
=== Albums ===
- Showstoppers (album), by Barry Manilow, 1991
- American Idol Season 4: The Showstoppers, 2005 album from the American Idol compilation series

=== Songs ===
- "Show Stopper" (Danity Kane song), 2006
- "Show Stopper", a song by Peaches from I Feel Cream, 2009
- "Showstopper" (TobyMac song), 2010
- "Showstopper", a song by Brandon & Leah, circa 2012
- "The Showstoppa", by Salt-N-Pepa, 1985

=== Other ===
- Showstopper! The Improvised Musical, a musical theatre show founded in London in 2008
- The Showstoppers, an American soul group, active 1967–1972

== Other uses ==
- Shawn Michaels (born 1965), nicknamed The Showstopper, professional wrestler
- Showstopper, or showstopper bug, a severe software bug
- Showstopper of the Year ESPY Award, awarded during the 1990s
- Showstopper American Dance Championships, an American dance competition
