= Tyler High School =

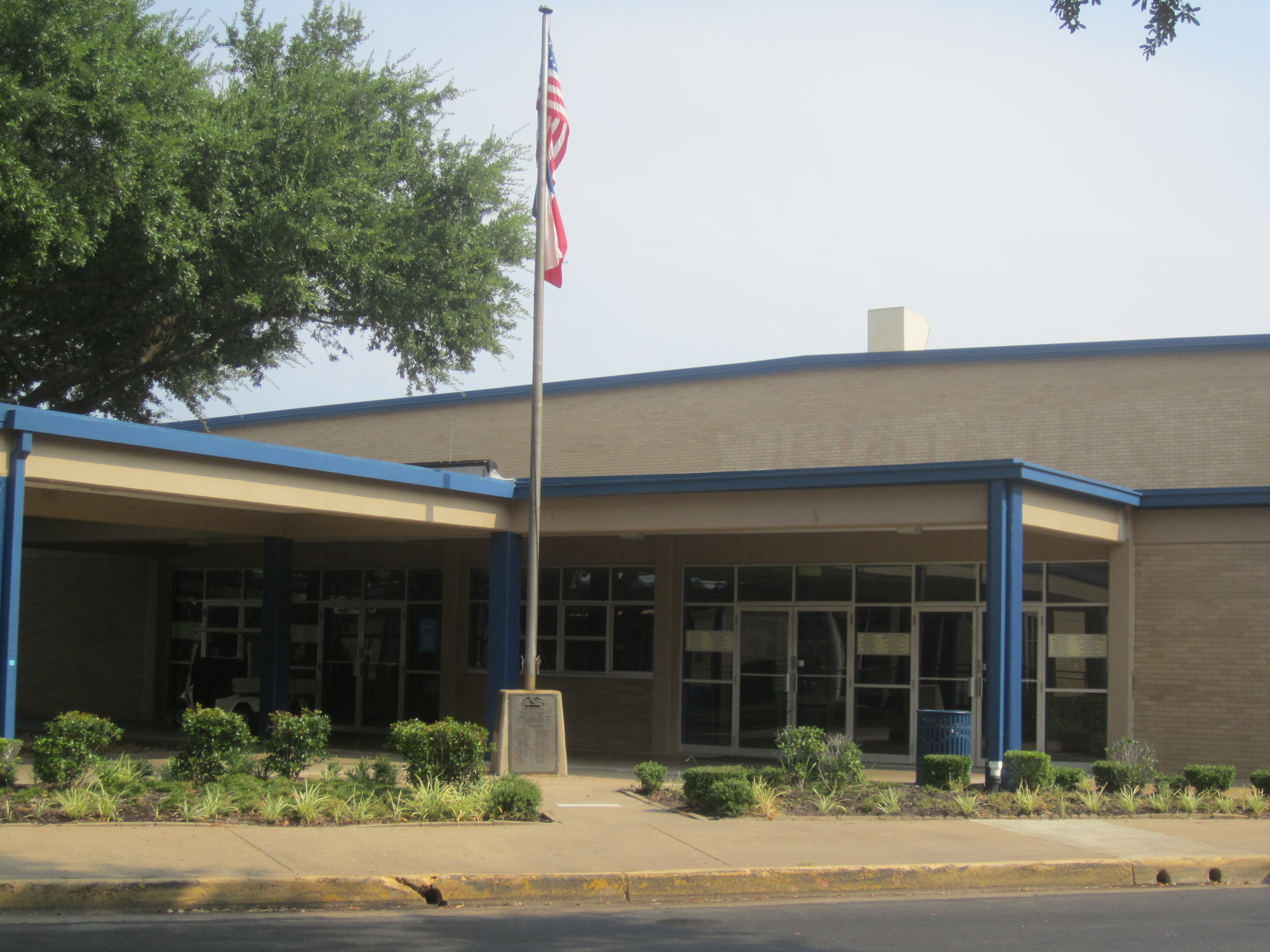
- Tyler High School in Tyler, Texas

Location
- 1120 N NW Loop 323; Tyler, Texas 75702; United States
- 32.36438°N 95.34539°W

Information
- Former name: Tyler High School (1880–1958; original); John Tyler High School (1958–2020)
- Type: Public School
- Motto: Proud is our Pride.
- School district: Tyler Independent School District
- Principal: Claude Lane
- Teaching staff: 134.80 (FTE)
- Grades: 9th–12th
- Enrollment: 2,100 (2023–2024)
- Student to teacher ratio: 15.58
- Campus type: Urban
- Colors: Blue and White
- Athletics conference: UIL Class 5A
- Mascot: Lion
- Yearbook: Alcalde
- Website: Tyler High School Website

Tyler High School, formerly known as John Tyler High School, is a public co-educational secondary school in Tyler, Texas. It is part of the Tyler Independent School District. It serves grades 9 through 12.

== About ==
Tyler High School was named after President John Tyler. It is a part of Tyler Independent School District, which is located in the northwest section of Tyler, Texas. As of the 2019-20 academic year, the school had an enrollment of approximately 2,110 students. Tyler offers academic avenues through the AP program, UIL competitions, and the College and Career Center. Tyler High School has a long tradition of athletic excellence in sports such as football, basketball, volleyball, and soccer.

Tyler High School shares a long-standing crosstown rivalry in sports with Tyler Legacy High School, formerly Robert E. Lee High School, located in south Tyler. Although both schools are in different classifications, they meet each year in a non-district game.

== History ==
On February 14, 1981, fire destroyed nearly 90 percent of John Tyler High School's campus.

=== Name changes ===
The school was named Tyler High School from 1880 until 1958; and in 1958 the name was changed to John Tyler High School, named after the 10th President of the United States. In 2020, the Tyler I. S. D. school board unanimously voted to change the name of the High School from John Tyler High back to Tyler High.

=== Campus safety ===
Historically safety has been an issue on campus and around 2009 hall monitors were replaced by uniformed police. In September 23, 2009 a 16 year old student was held after a teacher and music therapist Todd Henry was fatally stabbed in their classroom. In 2022, a student had a gun on campus and was harassing a classmate; that student was taken in to custody and was held at the Smith County Juvenile Attention Center.

== Demographics ==
As of the 2020–2021 school year, the student population consisted of:

- 63.2% Hispanic
- 33.1% African American
- 2.5% White (Non-Hispanic)
- 1.0% Two or more races
- 0.3% American Indian
- 0% Asian/Pacific Islander

== Athletics ==
Tyler High is known for its elite football program. The Tyler Lions have won three state championships: first in 1930 under coach George Foltz, when the school was known as "Tyler High," its original name, then in 1973 under coach Corky Nelson and 1994 under coach Allen Wilson, when the school was known as "John Tyler High."

The 1994 championship season featured the noteworthy 1994 John Tyler vs. Plano East high school football game, which ultimately won ESPN's 1995 Showstopper of the Year ESPY Award. In the regional final against Plano East (played at Texas Stadium), John Tyler had a 41–17 lead with 2:42 remaining. Plano East scored a touchdown, then recovered three consecutive onside kicks and scored touchdowns on each of them to take a 44–41 lead with 24 seconds remaining. However, on the ensuing kickoff, John Tyler returner Roderick Dunn ran for a touchdown to win the game 48–44.

== Notable alumni ==
- Gary Baxter, former NFL player
- Tyus Bowser, NFL player
- Earl Campbell, 1977 Heisman Trophy winner and former NFL Pro Bowl player
- Chris Carter, former NFL player
- Ricky Collins, current CFL wide receiver for the Saskatchewan Roughriders
- James Kenneth Crone, Texas Highway Patrol officer dramatized in the 1974 movie The Sugarland Express
- Tim Crowder, former NFL player
- Don Flynn, former AFL player with the New York Titans, Dallas Texans and CFL with the Edmonton Eskimos; All-American at University of Houston.
- Aqua Franklin, Texas A&M women's basketball 2004–2008, WNBA drafted 38th pick Sacramento Monarchs, assistant coach at Stephen F. Austin 2010–2011, University of Kansas 2011–2012, Mississippi State University. Currently, she is the associate head coach with University of Kansas.
- Keith Guthrie, former NFL player
- Daniel Hernandez, former MLS soccer player
- Rakim Hollis, basketball for TSU and European League
- Jeremy Johnson, former all-state quarterback, SMU wide receiver, holds the record for most receptions in a single season. Former NFL player with the Cincinnati Bengals.
- Kendall Hunter, NFL player, running back with the San Francisco 49ers
- Gary Jones, former NFL player
- Jeremy Lane, NFL player, cornerback with the Seattle Seahawks
- Ronnie "Bo" Lee, former NFL player
- Derrick McFall, college football running back for the SMU Mustangs
- Andrew Melontree, former NFL player
- Archie Reynolds, former MLB player
- Aaron Ross, 2006 Jim Thorpe Award winner and NFL player with the New York Giants
- Quincy Stewart, former NFL player and a member of the Edmonton Eskimos team of the CFL that won the Grey Cup in 2005
- Greg Ward Jr., NFL player
- Teddy Williams, four-time NCAA track and fieldAll-American at the University of Texas at San Antonio; NFL player
