= Showstopper of the Year ESPY Award =

The Showstopper of the Year ESPY Award was presented annually from 1993 to 1999.

== List of winners ==
Year of award	Athlete	Nation represented or nation of citizenship	Date(s)	Game or event	Venue	Competition, governing body, or league	Competing teams	Sport	Performance
1993	Derek Redmond	Great Britain	3 August 1992	1992 Summer Olympics	Estadi Olímpic de Montjuïc in Barcelona, Catalonia, Spain	Olympic Games	Not applicable	Track and field	He tore his hamstring in the 400 metres semi-final but fought through the pain and, with assistance from his father, managed to complete a full lap of the track
1994	Jim Abbott	United States	4 September 1993	1993 regular season game	Yankee Stadium in New York City, New York, United States	Major League Baseball	New York Yankees Cleveland Indians	Baseball	He threw a no-hitter as the Yankees defeated the Indians 4–0, despite having been born without a right hand
1995	Not applicable	United States	November 26, 1994	1994 John Tyler vs. Plano East high school football game	Texas Stadium in Irving, Texas, United States	Texas high school football Class 5A Division II regional semifinal (Region II)	John Tyler High School Lions of Tyler, Texas Plano East Senior High School Panthers of Plano, Texas	High school football	Tyler was leading 41–17 with 2:42 remaining. Plano East scored a touchdown, then recovered three consecutive onside kicks and scored touchdowns on each of them to take a 44–41 lead with 24 seconds remaining. However, on the ensuing kickoff, John Tyler returner Roderick Dunn ran for a touchdown to win the game 48–44.
1996	Cal Ripken Jr.	United States	September 6, 1995	1995 regular season game	Oriole Park at Camden Yards in Baltimore, Maryland, United States	Major League Baseball	Baltimore Orioles California Angels	Baseball	He played in his record-breaking 2,131st consecutive game, breaking Lou Gehrig's record
1997	Warren Morris	United States	June 8, 1996	1996 College World Series	Johnny Rosenblatt Stadium in Omaha, Nebraska, United States	NCAA Division I Baseball Championship	LSU Tigers Miami Hurricanes	College baseball	He hit a ninth-inning two-out two-run home run on the first pitch to win the College World Series for the LSU Tigers, with a final score of 9–8
1998	Tiger Woods	United States	April 10, 1997—April 13, 1997	1997 Masters Tournament	Augusta National Golf Club in Augusta, Georgia, United States	PGA Tour	Not applicable	Golf	He won his first major tournament, and did so by a record-breaking margin (for a major championship) of 12 strokes, also becoming the first non-white person to win at Augusta
1999	Mark McGwire	United States	September 8, 1998	1998 regular season game	Busch Stadium in St. Louis, Missouri, United States	Major League Baseball	St. Louis Cardinals Chicago Cubs	Baseball	He hit his 62nd home run of the season, breaking Roger Maris's record, in a home run record chase with Sammy Sosa

== See also ==
- Best Moment ESPY Award
- Best Play ESPY Award
- Under Armour Undeniable Performance ESPY Award
