= Williams High School (Plano, Texas) =

T.H. Williams High School
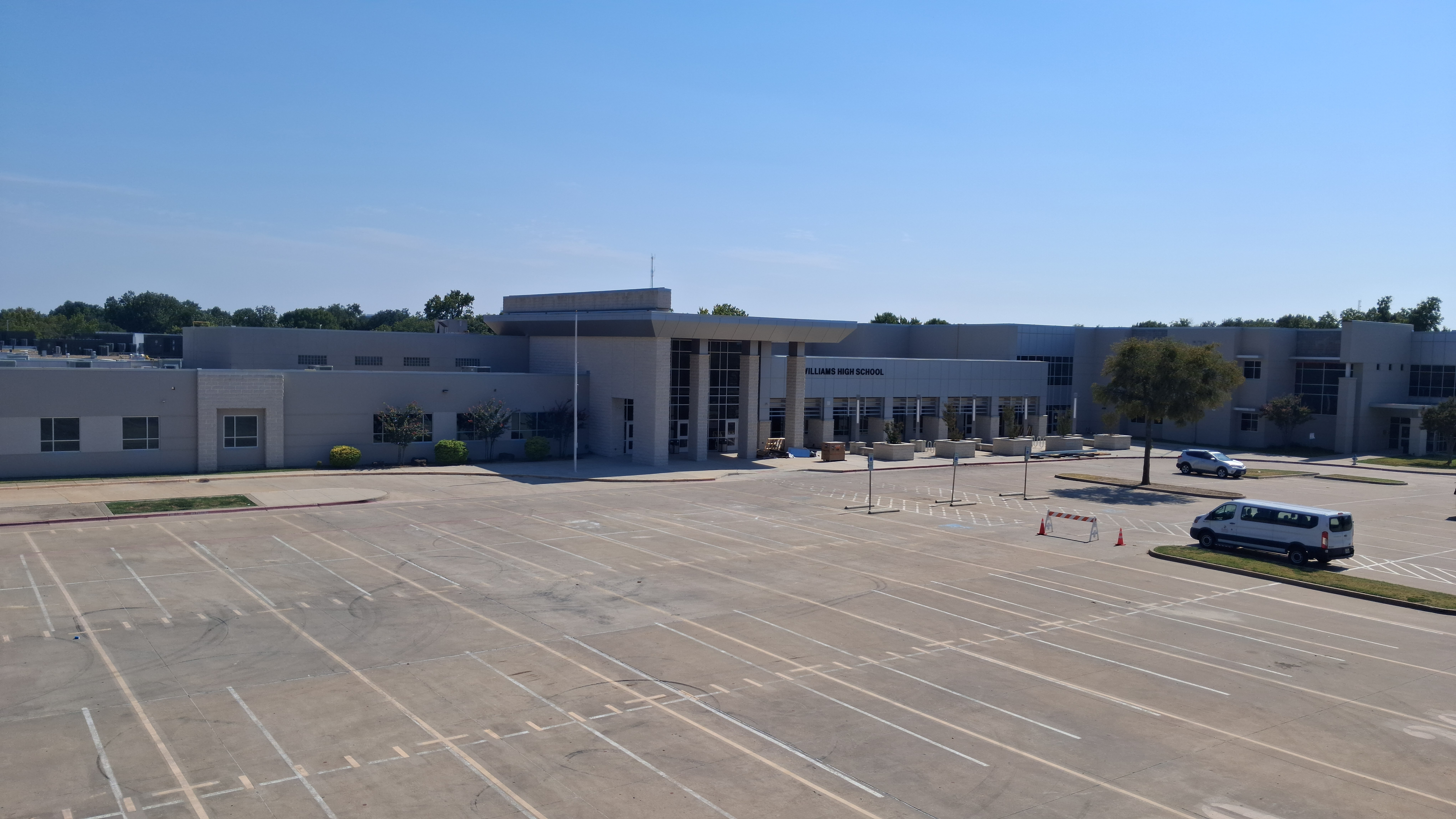
- Williams High School 2026 view image

Location
- 1818 18th Street; Plano, Texas 75074; United States; 33.022666°N 96.689327°W

Information
- Type: Free public
- Motto: Far better is it to take a chance to win glorious victory even though checkered by failure, than to take rank with those poor spirits who know no victory nor defeat because they live in the grey twilight and have tried neither.
- Established: 1961
- School district: Plano Independent School District
- Principal: Jill Engelking
- Teaching staff: 73.34 (FTE)
- Grades: 9th and 10th (High School and Health Sciences Academy)
- Enrollment: 1,186 (2023-2024)
- Student to teacher ratio: 16.17
- Campus type: Suburban
- Colors: Navy Blue and White
- Mascot: Panther
- Feeder schools: Otto MS and Bowman MS
- Website: https://www.pisd.edu/williams

T. H. Williams High School is a secondary school in Plano, Texas, United States, serving grades nine and ten. It is part of the Plano Independent School District. In Plano ISD, high school freshmen and sophomores attend one of six high schools. Juniors and seniors attend "senior high schools". Bowman and Otto middle schools feed into Williams. Williams High School feeds into Plano East Senior High School.

== History ==
Williams High School first served as Plano High School when it was built in 1961. That year the school included grades 8 through 12 and the total enrollment was 390 students. It was the first racially integrated school in Plano. Enrollment grew steadily until the 1965–66 school year when it was 653. The following school year, the campus became a grade 9 through 12 school and enrollment dropped to 555. Two years later, Williams became a grade 10 through 12 facility with 627 students. A new senior high school was completed in 1975 leaving the Williams campus with 938 freshmen and sophomores. Enrollment numbers had reached 1712 students by the 1973–74 school year. Enrollment has fluctuated over the years and as of the second week of the 2003–04 school year, enrollment had grown to 1633. Enrollment topped over 2000 students by the 2010-2011 school year, before dropping back down with the opening of McMillen High School relieving Williams’ enrollment.

Since its inception, Williams High School has experienced several renovations and additions. In 1961, $911,590 was paid to Avery Mays Construction Co. In 1970, an additional $1,100.000 went to KAS Construction Co. in an attempt to accommodate increased numbers. This addition included a library. $279,968 went to Corgan Associates in 1975.

JPJ Architects was awarded a $6,116,400 construction contract in 1989. At this time, the school underwent a major set of additions, renovations, and modernizations. Any remaining asbestos was removed. A two-story classroom addition was added, and the rear entrance of the school received a facelift with a new ‘Warrior Center’ being constructed consisting of large windows and a roof made completely of skylights.

Williams High School underwent a $12,634,480 renovation and addition completed in 2002. This provided the school with a new band hall, and a large wing of additional classrooms in the rear of the school, and converted the auto-tech and agriculture classrooms into traditional classrooms as those programs had been eliminated from the school. A new dance gymnasium was also added at this time. The school’s kitchen was expanded and the cafeteria received a fourth serving line at this time.

The 2002 renovation also provided a new exterior look for Williams. A new facade was built over the front entrance off 17th street as well as over the auditorium. The front of the school looked completely different than it did before the renovation. It gives the appearance that the building is much taller than it actually is.

Another new addition came in 2006 as the school’s population continued to increase thanks to the population growth in Far East Plano, Richardson and Murphy in the mid-2000s. This 40,000-square-foot (3,700 m^{2}), two-story Science Addition contains 12 science laboratories accompanied by restrooms and storage areas. The new addition to Williams High School was completed in August 2006 at a cost of $6,630,343.

In 2011, with the opening of McMillen High School reducing the school’s enrollment to a more manageable level, spare classrooms throughout the school were gutted and converted into collaboration spaces for Project Based Learning. At this time, a large set of classrooms were also gutted and converted into a new, modern counseling center.

In 2013, another set of original classrooms and restrooms were gutted to make space for Plano ISD’s new Health Sciences academy. This renovation created state-of-the-art classrooms for students interested in the medical field to learn and receive training and certification, complete with hospital beds.

60 years since it was built, the school has doubled in physical size, with the number of added classrooms over the years outnumbering the number of original ones. The interior of the school is unrecognizable to its original look. All floors, ceilings, carpets, doors, windows, etc have gone through several iterations of being replaced. The 1989 and 2002 renovations went so far as to remove and replace any finishes that had been added even in more recent additions and renovations, to ensure finishes throughout new and old parts of the school had the same look. To those unfamiliar with the school’s history, it is almost impossible to tell whether you’re standing in an original wing of the school or not, because of all the renovations. Almost none of the school’s original exterior walls are still visible from the outside. They’ve all been covered up by building additions over the years. When the school was originally built, the cafeteria, auditorium and gymnasium all featured large windows to let in natural light. Over the years as additions have been made to the school, those windows, and all of the school’s other original windows, have been filled in or covered up by new parts of the building.

Only the cafeteria, band hall (which is now the orchestra room) and auditorium were air conditioned when the school was first built. Classrooms had large sets of windows that filled entire walls to let in fresh air. When the school was retrofitted to be fully air conditioned in the 1980s, drop ceilings had to be added in the original classrooms and corridors to hide HVAC infrastructure. This resulted in the ceilings being much lower than architects ever originally intended in the original parts of the school.

In some cases over the years, additional classrooms have been added wherever they could fit, whether or not it made sense from a design standpoint. Courtyards between the school’s original hallways were filled in with new classrooms by the 1980s. This has led students and staff over the years to dub the school ‘the maze’ or ‘the cave, because of its uncohesive design, low ceilings, and lack of natural light.

In 2021, the first phase of yet another major renovation project kicked off. This renovation was funded through leftover funds from Plano ISD’s 2016 bond. The goal of this renovation is to finally make the school feel cohesive again.

As of November 2021, the school’s main entrance and main office was in the process of being relocated to what was formerly the rear entrance of the school off 18th street, where a new grand entrance was in the process of being constructed—adding a new facade to the front of the Warrior Center. This phase of the project also involved relocating SpecialEd Classrooms, Art Classrooms, and the Counseling center to more appropriate parts of the school.

Once funding is secured for the second phase, the school will receive another interior facelift, with a goal of creating a more cohesive layout than the current “patchwork quilt” that years of additions and renovations has led to. Much of the building will be gutted and hallways will be realigned. Ceilings will be removed and raised in some cases. Skylights will be added through a new grand main hallway. Once completed, the interior layout of the school will be nearly unrecognizable compared to the original layout.

T. H. Williams, principal from 1961–1968, came to the district in 1936 as a math instructor and coach in the old Plano High School (now the Cox Building). He was head coach from 1943 to 1953, leading his teams to several district and state titles. A new Plano High School was built on 17th street in 1961 at a cost of $993,590. This campus was renamed T. H. Williams High School when the new Plano Senior High opened in 1975. Thomas Howard "Bill" Williams (1902-1992) was honored as a teacher, coach, and principal who had given almost five decades of service to educating youths of Collin County.

== Athletics ==
The Williams Warriors compete in these sports:

- Baseball
- Basketball
- Football
- Tennis
- Volleyball
- Wrestling
- Band

== Health Sciences Academy ==
Starting in the 2013-14 school year, Plano ISD has been offering a two-year health science program at Williams High School for freshmen and sophomores interested in pursuing a career in the health field. The health science program is continued at Plano East Senior High for juniors and seniors. With a partnership with Collin College, students gain many opportunities: college credits, workforce certifications, working with real medical equipment and communicating with the local medical professionals (through field trips and clinical placements in skill-based classes.

Plano ISD Career and Technical Education offer additional medical courses in Plano ISD Health Sciences Academy than any other school. Extensions of the following classes that are taught at the Health Sciences Academy include:

- Biomedical Science
- Pharmacology
- Practicum/Clinical Rotations
- World Health Research
