= 1994 John Tyler vs. Plano East high school football game =

High school football game in Texas, US

John Tyler HS (13–0)	Plano East (12–1)
48	44
Head coach: Allen Wilson	Head coach: Scott Phillips
	1	2	3	4	Total
JT	7	14	3	24	48
PE	7	7	3	27	44
- Date: November 26, 1994
- Stadium: Texas Stadium; Irving, Texas
- Attendance: 20,000

TV in the United States
- Network: Plano TeleCable
- Announcers: Eddy Clinton, Denny Garver, Mike Zoffuto

On November 26, 1994, in a high school football playoff game in Texas, the Lions of John Tyler High School defeated the Panthers of Plano East Senior High School 48–44. The game drew national attention in the United States due to its wildly improbable and tumultuous finish, with seven touchdowns scored in the last four and a half minutes, and it won the 1995 Showstopper of the Year ESPY Award. It has been billed by many sportscasters, both in Texas and the rest of the United States, as the greatest high school football game ever played.

== Game summary ==
The game was a Region II semifinal in class 5A Division II of Texas high school football and was played in Texas Stadium. The start time was 9:00 pm. Both teams had a 12–0 record up to that point in the season, and they were known for defense: John Tyler was giving up only 14 points per game on average, while Plano East was giving up less than nine. Plano East was ranked No. 2 in the state, and Tyler was ranked #3.

The first quarter ended at 7–7, but at halftime, the Lions had a 21–14 lead. In the third quarter, each team kicked a field goal, bringing the score to 24–17.

The Lions then scored a field goal early in the fourth quarter to make the score 27–17. Towards the end of the quarter, as the Panthers were facing first-and-goal, the ball was stripped from their quarterback and the resulting fumble was returned 90 yards for a touchdown and a 34–17 lead with 4:24 remaining. On the fourth play of the Panthers' next possession, another fumble was returned 36 yards for a touchdown, giving the Lions a seemingly insurmountable 41–17 lead with only 3:03 remaining. Many fans had already headed for the exits.

=== Comeback ===
However, on a two-play 70-yard drive, the Panthers scored a touchdown to bring the score to 41–23 (after a failed two-point conversion) with 2:36 on the clock. The Panthers then successfully executed three onside kicks in a row, recovering the ball each time and then driving down the field for a touchdown on each occasion. The first touchdown drive took six plays (the two-point conversion was good: 41–31 with 1:29 left); the second also took six plays (the two-point conversion failed: 41–37 with 0:56 left); the final one was completed in three plays (the extra point was successful), giving the Panthers a 44–41 comeback lead with only 24 seconds remaining.

=== Ending ===
In a final twist, however, after the Panthers did a regular kickoff, the Lions' returner Roderick Dunn caught the ball at his own three-yard line and took it 97 yards for a touchdown at 0:11 and a 48–44 Lions victory. He was the very same player who had muffed the reception of the final two onside kicks, and it was the only touchdown of his high school career.

In their final very brief possession, the Panthers started on their 20-yard line on a touchback and the game ended two plays later with an interception.

Between the two teams, 48 points (seven touchdowns) in total had been scored in the game's final four and a half minutes. The Lions' offense never touched the ball again after their field goal early in the fourth quarter. The Lions' final 21 points were scored by the defense and special teams.

Texas Class 5A, Division II, Region II Semifinal, 1994

Quarter	1	2	3	4	Total
John Tyler	7	14	3	24	48
Plano East	7	7	3	27	44

at Texas Stadium, Irving, Texas

- Date: November 26, 1994
- Game attendance: 20,000
- TV announcers (Plano TeleCable): Eddy Clinton, Denny Garver, Mike Zoffuto
- Boxscore

Game information

First quarter

- JT Taafee Hines 22 yard run (Nicholas Hernandez kick)
- PE Robert Woods 10 yard run (Kenny Reed kick)

Second quarter

- PE Rico Hall 27 yard run (Reed kick)
- JT Michael Price 8 yard run (Hernandez kick)
- JT David Warren 13 yard pass from Morris Anderson (Hernandez kick)

Third quarter

- JT Hernandez 21 yard FG
- PE Reed 37 yard FG

Fourth quarter

- JT Hernandez 26 yard FG
- JT Marc Broyles 90 yard fumble return (Hernandez kick)
- JT Warren 36 yard fumble return (Hernandez kick)
- PE Terence Green 21 yard pass from Jeff Whitley (pass failed)
- PE Jonathan Braddick 5 yard pass from Whitley (Whitley-Woods pass)
- PE Braddick 6 yard pass from Whitley (run failed)
- PE Woods 22 yard pass from Whitley (Reed kick)
- JT Roderick Dunn 97 yard kickoff return (Hernandez kick)

== Aftermath ==
The Lions went on to win the 1994 state championship in 5A Division II, defeating Lake Highlands 27–7 in the Region II final, Arlington 45–20 in the state semifinals and Austin Westlake 35–24 in the state championship.

The game was originally broadcast locally on community-access Plano TeleCable, but was later rebroadcast nationally on ESPN2. Play-by-play announcers Eddy Clinton and Denny Garver, accompanied by guest commentator Mike Zoffuto (the Lake Highlands head football coach, who was scouting his team's next opponent), got a modest amount of temporary fame for their colorful, folksy, and highly partisan commentary during the comeback, including "Bingo bango bongo", "Good gosh almighty", "Break out the Oreos, baby", and "I done wet my britches".

When Plano East took the lead, Garver jubilantly proclaimed "the greatest comeback of all time", but soon Zoffuto was repeatedly exclaiming "Oh, no" as the final touchdown return unfolded, and then "I don't believe it. God bless those kids... I am sick, I want to throw up."

The broadcast commentary became part of the game's lore, and Clinton and Garver appeared on The Tonight Show with Jay Leno on Friday, December 16, 1994 and did many radio interviews. Some sources mention that they also received roles as announcers in the movie Varsity Blues, reportedly at the suggestion of Jon Voight who had heard the tape; however IMDb does not credit them in the list of cast or crew.

Zoffuto had been asked to be guest commentator because he was the coach of the Lake Highlands team, which would meet the game winner the following week. On that occasion his team lost 27–7 in what would turn out to be the final game of his eight years as Lake Highlands coach. It was Zoffuto who reacted with memorably vocal dismay on the broadcast as the final kickoff was returned for a touchdown, and in later years he would tease Clinton and Garver that they owed their post-broadcast fame to him. As a coach scouting his next opponent and obviously not an actual Plano East fan, he explained his reaction by saying, "I could see it developing and what was going to happen. I really felt bad for those kids and it just came out." On another occasion, he stated that his team had lost an earlier game to Plano East on a controversial call, and he had wanted a chance for a rematch.

The game was given the 1995 Showstopper of the Year ESPY Award. In 2006, ESPN ranked the game among its top 10 premature celebrations of all-time.

Eddy Clinton purchased the broadcast rights for the game for $200. On the tenth anniversary of the game, he released a DVD entitled "The Greatest High School Football Game of All Time". The advent of Internet video sites like YouTube added to the game's notoriety in later years.

The two teams did not meet again until 2006, when Plano East won 27–3.

== Partial list of players ==
John Tyler: Morris Anderson, quarterback; Roderick Dunn, kickoff returner; Nico Hernandez, field goal kicker; DeMarcus Hamilton, defense; Marc Broyles, defense; David Warren; Darwin Brown; Jesse Taylor; Mickey Jones; Taafee Hines; Michael Price; Quincy Stewart; Gary Baxter; Allen Wilson, coach

Plano East: Jeff Whitley, quarterback; Jonathan Braddick, offense; Terence Green, offense and kicker; Robert Woods; Rico Hall; Kenny Reed; Kevin Coit; Derek Martin, David Tomlinson, Donald Tomlinson, Dion Hilliard, Scott Phillips, coach
