= James Kenneth Crone =

American law enforcement officer (1941–2011)

James Kenneth Crone, often known as Kenneth Crone (August 16, 1941 – February 10, 2011) was a Texas Highway Patrol officer from 1967 to 1978. During his law enforcement career, he was kidnapped on May 2, 1969, by Robert Dent and Ila Fae Holiday and then taken on a slow speed police chase across south Texas involving multiple police jurisdictions. This event was dramatized in the 1974 feature film The Sugarland Express directed by Steven Spielberg. Crone was an advisor on the film and had a small role as a deputy sheriff.

== Early life ==
Crone was born in Tyler, Smith County, Texas and graduated from John Tyler High School before entering the U.S. Air Force where he served 4 years. In 1967, he joined the Texas Department of Public Safety graduating in class C-67 and was stationed at Winnie in Chambers County, Texas.

Later, James Kenneth Crone married Carolyn Faye Fontenot and had two sons.
