= Rakim Hollis =

American basketball player (born 1980)

Rakim "Rocky" Marques Hollis (born May 17, 1980, in Los Angeles, California) is an American basketball player who played in the European Basketball League (FIBA) for six years.

== Career ==
After starring at John Tyler High School in Tyler, Texas, he played for the Texas Southern University Tigers. In the NCAA, where he started, he helped the team to win the SWAC 2003 Conference, and was named MVP of the SWAC tournament. Also led SWAC in scoring for two consecutive years in the 2002–03 season. According to Coverwire, Hollis was named one of the best 'No Name' college point guards in the United States.

Hollis is the 2018–2019 Head Men's Basketball Coach at SUNY Adirondack "after spending the last year revamping Albany College of Pharmacy and Health Sciences's defense and ranking number one in the USCAA in defensive efficiency".
