= Warren Morris =

American baseball player (born 1974)

- Second baseman
- Born: January 11, 1974 (age 52); Alexandria, Louisiana, U.S.
- Batted: Left Threw: Right

MLB debut
- April 5, 1999, for the Pittsburgh Pirates

Last MLB appearance
- September 28, 2003, for the Detroit Tigers

MLB statistics
- Batting average: .267
- Home runs: 26
- Runs batted in: 164
- Stats at Baseball Reference

Teams
- Pittsburgh Pirates (1999–2001); Minnesota Twins (2002); Detroit Tigers (2003)
Medals
Men's baseball
Representing United States
Olympic Games
Bronze medal – third place	1996 Atlanta	Team

Warren Randall Morris (born January 11, 1974) is an American former college and Major League Baseball player. He is most remembered for his two-out, 9th inning walk-off home run that won the 1996 College World Series for the Louisiana State University Tigers.

== Early life ==
Morris grew up in Alexandria, Louisiana and graduated from Bolton High School. He played baseball, basketball and cross country at Bolton High.

== College career ==
Morris joined the LSU baseball team in 1993. He did not receive an athletic scholarship to play baseball, but made the team while on academic scholarship as a second baseman. He did not play at second base in his first season at LSU, because the Tigers already had All-American Todd Walker at the position. Morris did see action at other positions. Walker went pro after the 1994 season, and Morris became the team's starting second baseman from 1995 to 1996. His best season at LSU came in 1995. He hit .369 with 8 home runs, 50 RBI, and 18 stolen bases.

LSU was expecting big things from Morris in 1996, but a broken hamate bone kept him out of the lineup for 42 games that season. He did rejoin the team in time for the 1996 postseason, which would include the College World Series. However, the wrist injury still lingered. He could not hit for power, and was placed at the bottom of the lineup.

=== College World Series hero ===
LSU reached the championship game of the College World Series in 1996, and was trailing Miami 8–7 in the game with two outs in the bottom of the ninth inning. Morris came up to the plate with one runner on base, and hit Miami relief pitcher Robbie Morrison's first pitch just inches over the right field fence. The walk-off home run won the game for the Tigers 9–8. It was his only home run of the season, and is the only walk-off championship-winning home run in College World Series history. In addition, it is the only 2-out, ninth inning, walk-off home run in a championship of any collegiate or professional level. The home run also won Morris the 1997 Showstopper of the Year ESPY Award.

== Major League Baseball career ==
Morris was drafted in the fifth round of the 1996 Major League Baseball draft by the Texas Rangers as a second baseman. He started out in the Rangers' farm system, but was later traded to the Pittsburgh Pirates along with relief pitcher Todd Van Poppel for starting pitcher Esteban Loaiza. He made his major league debut in 1999, going from non-roster invitee in spring training to starting second baseman early in the season. Morris had a promising rookie season with the Pirates, hitting .288 with 15 home runs and 73 RBI, while placing third in National League Rookie of the Year voting. He also made the 1999 Topps All-Star Rookie Roster at second base. It was his best season as a pro. However, the Pirates released him before the 2002 season. Morris was the starting second baseman for the 2003 Detroit Tigers, following the release of Damion Easley. For the rest of his career, he was a journeyman infielder in the minor leagues. He announced his retirement from baseball in 2006.

== See also ==
- 1996 LSU Tigers baseball team
