= Showstopper (dance competition) =

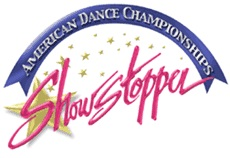
- Founder: Debbie Roberts
- Headquarters: Myrtle Beach, South Carolina, United States
- Area served: North America
- Owner: Debbie Roberts, Dave Roberts
- Website: www.goshowstopper.com

Showstopper is a dance competition company that hosts competitions in over 54 cities in the United States. The company was founded by Debbie Roberts in 1978, and is currently headquartered in Myrtle Beach, South Carolina.

== Competition format ==
Showstopper provides categories for dancers to compete in including Hip-Hop, Musical Theater, Jazz, Tap, Ballet, Pointe, Lyrical Jazz, Song & Dance, Acrobatic Dance, Baton, Pom Pon, Clogging, Character Routine, Folkloric, Open, Contemporary, All Male, Production, and Teachers Categories. The company holds regional events across the United States and six National Finals events at Sandusky, OH, Mashantucket, CT, Myrtle Beach, SC, Kissimmee, FL, Galveston, TX, and Anaheim, CA.

== Types of Entries ==
- Solo
- Duet/Trio
- Small Group (4 to 9 dancers)
- Large Group (10 to 19 dancers)
- Super Group (20 or more dancers)

== Competition Levels ==
- Performance (Dancers who take a total of THREE HOURS OR LESS of combined dance and/or acrobatics lessons per week.)
- Advanced (Dancers taking THREE TO FIVE HOURS of dance and/or acrobatics per week with limited competition experience.)
- Competitive (All dancers taking FIVE HOURS OR MORE of dance and/or acrobatics per week.)

== Age Divisions ==
- Mini (8 years & under)
- Junior (9–11 years)
- Teen (12–14 years)
- Senior (15–19 years)
- Adult (20 years and over)

== Categories of Dance ==
- Hip Hop
- Musical Theater
- Jazz
- Tap
- Ballet
- Pointe
- Lyrical Jazz
- Song and Dance
- Acrobatic Dance
- Baton
- Pom Pom
- Clogging
- Character Routine
- Folkloric
- Open
- Contemporary
- All Male
- Production
- Teacher

== Regional Awards ==
=== Top Solo ===
$50 plus a $50 gift certificate to the Soloist in the Mini, Junior, Teen, and Senior age group receiving the highest overall score.

=== Top Duet/Trio ===
$50 plus a $50 gift certificate to the Duet/Trio in the Mini, Junior, Teen, and Senior age group receiving the highest overall score.

=== Top Small Group ===
$100 plus a $100 gift certificate to the Small Group in the Mini, Junior, Teen, and Senior age group receiving the highest overall score.

=== Top Large Group ===
$100 plus a $100 gift certificate to the Large Group in the Mini, Junior, Teen, and Senior age group receiving the highest overall score.

=== Top Super Group ===
$100 plus a $100 gift certificate to the Super Group in the Mini, Junior, Teen, and Senior age group receiving the highest overall score.

== National Awards ==
=== Top Solo ===
$250 plus a $250 gift certificate to the soloist in Mini, Junior, Teen, and Senior age group receiving the highest overall score. $150 plus a $150 gift certificate to the soloist in these age groups receiving the second highest overall score. $100 plus a $100 gift certificate to the soloist in these age groups receiving the third highest overall score. The most top prizes won was Rising Stars Dance Studio, England. Chantè Greenwood is Miss National Soloist and Andrew Campbell is Mr National soloist

=== Top Duet/Trio ===
$250 plus a $250 gift certificate to the Duet/Trio in Mini, Junior, Teen, and Senior age group receiving the highest overall score. $150 plus a $150 gift certificate to the Duet/Trio in these age groups receiving the second highest overall score. $100 plus a $100 gift certificate to the Duet/Trio in these age groups receiving the third highest overall score.

=== Top Small Group ===
$500 plus a $500 gift certificate to the Small Group in Mini, Junior, Teen, and Senior age group receiving the highest overall score. $200 plus a $200 gift certificate to the Small Group in these age groups receiving the second highest overall score. $100 plus a $100 gift certificate to the Small Group in these age groups receiving the third highest overall score.

=== Top Large Group ===
$500 plus a $500 gift certificate to the Large Group in Mini, Junior, Teen, and Senior age group receiving the highest overall score. $200 plus a $200 gift certificate to the Large Group in these age groups receiving the second highest overall score. $100 plus a $100 gift certificate to the Large Group in these age groups receiving the third highest overall score.

=== Top Super Group ===
$500 plus a $500 gift certificate to the Super Group in Mini, Junior, Teen, and Senior age group receiving the highest overall score. $200 plus a $200 gift certificate to the Super Group in these age groups receiving the second highest overall score. $100 plus a $100 gift certificate to the Super Group in these age groups receiving the third highest overall score.

== Dance Convention ==
During the Fall and Winter Season, there are Showstopper Dance Conventions that provide classes where dance students can learn and participate in different styles of dance. Teacher classes are also provided for studio owners and dance teachers. These classes are taught by instructors with different backgrounds of dance and business.
