= The Sugarland Express =

1974 film by Steven Spielberg

- Theatrical release poster
- Directed by: Steven Spielberg
- Screenplay by: Hal Barwood; Matthew Robbins
- Story by: Steven Spielberg; Hal Barwood; Matthew Robbins
- Produced by: Richard D. Zanuck; David Brown
- Starring: Goldie Hawn; Ben Johnson; Michael Sacks; William Atherton
- Cinematography: Vilmos Zsigmond
- Edited by: Edward M. Abroms; Verna Fields
- Music by: John Williams
- Production company: The Zanuck/Brown Company
- Distributed by: Universal Pictures
- Release dates: March 29, 1974 (New Directors/New Films Festival); March 31, 1974 (New York)
- Running time: 110 minutes
- Country: United States
- Language: English
- Budget: $3 million
- Box office: $12 million

The Sugarland Express is a 1974 American crime drama film directed by Steven Spielberg. The film follows a woman (Goldie Hawn) and her husband (William Atherton) as they take a police officer (Michael Sacks) hostage and flee across Texas while they try to get to their child before he is placed in foster care. The film was based on true events, some of which occurred in Sugar Land, Texas, where parts of the film were shot. Other scenes were filmed in San Antonio, Live Oak, Floresville, Pleasanton, Converse and Del Rio, Texas.

The Sugarland Express marks the first collaboration between Spielberg and composer John Williams, who has scored all but five of Spielberg's films since. Although Williams re-recorded the main theme with Toots Thielemans and the Boston Pops Orchestra for 1991's The Spielberg/Williams Collaboration, the score was not released as an album until June 15, 2024, coinciding with the film's 50th anniversary.

The film premiered at the New Directors/New Films Festival on March 29, 1974, and was released theatrically in New York City on March 31, 1974, followed by a year-long worldwide theatrical rollout. The film was a commercial disappointment but received generally positive reviews from critics, who praised Hawn's performance, Spielberg's direction, and the cinematography. The film has become a cult classic as a staple in the new Hollywood era which launched the career of Steven Spielberg.

== Plot ==
In April 1969, Lou Jean Poplin visits her incarcerated husband, Clovis Michael Poplin, to tell him that their son will soon be placed in the care of foster parents. Even though he is four months away from being released from prison, she convinces him to escape to assist her in retrieving their child. They hitch a ride from the prison with a couple, but when Texas Department of Public Safety Patrolman Maxwell Slide stops the car, they take the car and run.

When the car crashes, the two felons overpower and kidnap Slide, holding him hostage at the head of a slow-moving and growing caravan, initially of police cars but eventually including news vans, private citizens' vehicles, and helicopters. The Poplins and Slide travel through Beaumont, Dayton, Houston, Cleveland, Conroe, and finally Wheelock, Texas. By holding Slide hostage, the pair are able to continually gas up their car, as well as obtain food and supplies, some of which are provided by locals. During the lengthy pursuit, Slide and the pair bond and develop mutual respect for one another.

The trio attempts to commandeer an RV from a used car lot, but local vigilantes try to inflict justice on the Poplins. They make contact with Captain Tanner, who allows them to depart after further bargaining with Clovis. The Poplins make it to Sugarland, at which point Captain Tanner attempts to have Clovis turn himself in and he refuses. Slide and then Clovis recognize that something is amiss at the home of the foster parents, but Lou Jean insists that Clovis retrieve their son. A pair of Texas Rangers shoot and fatally wound Clovis, and after another car chase, the Texas Department of Public Safety arrests Lou Jean. Patrolman Slide is found unharmed.

An epilogue preceding the closing credits explains that Lou Jean subsequently spent fifteen months of a five-year prison term in a women's correctional facility. Upon getting out, she obtained the right to live with her son after convincing authorities that she was able to do so.

== Cast ==
- Goldie Hawn as Lou Jean
- Ben Johnson as Captain Tanner
- Michael Sacks as Slide
- William Atherton as Clovis
- Gregory Walcott as Mashburn
- Steve Kanaly as Jessup
- Louise Latham as Mrs. Looby

In addition, James Kenneth Crone appears in a cameo as one of the deputies involved in the pursuit.

== Historical accuracy ==
The film's Lou Jean Poplin and Clovis Michael Poplin are based on the lives of then-21-year-old Ila Fae Holiday/Dent and 22-year-old Robert "Bobby" Dent, respectively. The character of Texas Highway Patrolman Slide is based on then-27-year-old Trooper J. Kenneth Crone. The character of Captain Tanner is based on Texas Highway Patrol Captain Jerry Miller.

In real life, Ila Fae did not break Bobby out of prison – he had been released from prison in April 1969, two weeks before the slow-motion car chase began. Unlike in the film, when Bobby was shot at Ila Fae's parents' house he was captured, and died about an hour later in a Bryan hospital. The shooting took place near Wheelock, Texas where they had gone to visit Ila Fae's two children (from a previous marriage). Ila Fae was sentenced to five years in prison, serving only five months.

== Production ==
After working as a television director, Steven Spielberg made his first stand alone feature film-length production with the TV movie Duel, released in November 1971. After that he persuaded co-producers Richard Zanuck and David Brown to let him make his big-screen directorial debut with The Sugarland Express, which was based on a true story. Principal photography had been completed in 1973. Shortly after it was released in March 1974, Spielberg began his next project for Zanuck and Brown in 1975's blockbuster hit Jaws.

Clips from the Wile E. Coyote/Road Runner cartoon Whoa, Be-Gone! are shown in silence during a scene near a drive-in theater. Wile E. Coyote and the Road Runner later appeared in the 1988 Touchstone/Amblin film Who Framed Roger Rabbit.

This was the first movie to use the Panavision Panaflex camera.

== Release ==
The film premiered at the New Directors/New Films Festival on March 29, 1974, and was released theatrically in New York City on March 31, 1974, followed by a year-long worldwide theatrical rollout. The film later held its French premiere in competition at the 1974 Cannes Film Festival. A 50th anniversary retrospective screening of the film, which was followed by a Q&A with Spielberg and Variety exclusive editor Brent Lang, took place at the 2024 Tribeca Festival on June 15, 2024, which also included a surprise video greeting from Goldie Hawn. This screening marked, according to Spielberg, the first time since its initial release that the film had ever been screened publicly in a theater in front of a live audience.

=== Box office ===
The film grossed $6.5 million in the United States and Canada and $5.5 million overseas for a worldwide gross of $12 million, making it the lowest-grossing film of Spielberg's career. This resulted in Universal declaring the film a box office failure and pulling it from theaters after just two weeks into its initial theatrical release. The film has been named a cult classic over the years.

=== Critical reception ===
The Sugarland Express received positive reviews from critics. It holds an 87% rating on Rotten Tomatoes with an average score of 7.2 out of 10 from 52 reviews. The website's critical consensus reads, "Its plot may ape the countercultural road movies of its era, but Steven Spielberg's feature debut displays many of the crowd-pleasing elements he'd refine in subsequent films." Metacritic, which uses a weighted average, assigned the film a score of 65 out of 100, based on 4 critics, indicating "generally favorable" reviews.

Roger Ebert gave the film two-and-a-half stars out of four and wrote, "If the movie finally doesn’t succeed, that’s because Spielberg has paid too much attention to all those police cars (and all the crashes they get into), and not enough to the personalities of his characters. We get to know these three people just enough to want to know them better." Gene Siskel of the Chicago Tribune awarded the same two-and-a-half star grade and wrote that "whereas Bonnie and Clyde prompted our sympathy for its heroes because of their winning style, The Sugarland Express asks us to care for Clovis and Lou Jean because they are thick-skulled and because, presumably, every mother has an inherent right to raise her own baby. It doesn't work."

Arthur D. Murphy of Variety called Hawn's performance "generally delightful" but found that "something happens to the picture" toward the end as "the story opts for an abrupt series of production number shootouts, as though this was the real purpose in making the film, and all that preceded was introductory filler and vamp. Too bad, for two-thirds of the film is artful, the rest strident." Tom Milne of The Monthly Film Bulletin wrote that it "seems peculiarly contrived ... it may have happened this way in real life, but in the film the fugitives are so unequivocally presented as poor, harmless innocents that the veritable army of police cars absurdly queuing up to be in at the kill looks very much as though both they and the film were taking a sledgehammer to crack a nut."

Other reviews were much more positive. Kevin Thomas of the Los Angeles Times called it "a dazzling, funny, exciting and finally poignant film," and called it "astonishing" what Spielberg, Barwood and Robbins "have managed to accomplish within a simple trek plot. Starting out as a comedy that gradually darkens, The Sugarland Express, which is based on an actual incident, becomes an increasingly disenchanted portrait of contemporary America." Nora Sayre of The New York Times wrote, "Spielberg, the 26-year old director, has built up Texas as a major character in his movie. As the herd of cars races and heaves and crashes through the landscape, the state's personality surfaces like a sperm whale. Mr. Spielberg has also made marvelous use of many Texans, some of whom haven't acted before." Gary Arnold of The Washington Post called it "an exciting new American film—a funny, tense and ultimately touching chase melodrama ... It's an odyssey you may never forget, and you might as well memorize the names of the young filmmakers responsible for it, the 26-year old director, Steven Spielberg, and the 30-year old screenwriters (and no doubt prospective directors), Hal Barwood and Matthew Robbins, because they've made one of the most stunning debuts in Hollywood history."

Pauline Kael wrote that "In terms of the pleasure that technical assurance gives an audience, this is one of the most phenomenal début films in the history of movies." David Thomson sees the film as a natural followup to Duel: "Sugarland Express is another epic of the road—raucous, feverish, and based on an actual incident. What makes its quest and journey so touching is the treatment of the central characters. They are not self-aware, enlightened or stereotyped, and the movie never patronizes them. Goldie Hawn's wife is an untidy, vibrant woman, a robust departure from the social gentility that usually encloses Hollywood women. She is genuinely vulgar, but is never mocked because of it."

== Accolades ==
The film won the award for Best Screenplay at the 1974 Cannes Film Festival. It also competed for the coveted Grand Prix du Festival International du Film (later known as the Palme d'Or) at the festival, but lost to Francis Ford Coppola's The Conversation.
