= Kourtney Gibson =

American business executive

- Born: Kourtney Kristine Ratliff; July 5, 1981 (age 45)
- Education: Kellogg School of Management at Northwestern University; University of Miami
- Occupations: Chief Executive Officer and Senior Executive Vice President of TIAA Retirement Solutions
- Years active: 1997–present
- Board member of: MarketAxess; Viterbo University
- Spouse: Aubrey Gibson
- Children: 4

Kourtney Gibson (July 5, 1981) is an American business executive. She is Chief Executive Officer of TIAA Retirement Solutions. She was formerly the president and vice executive chairman of Loop Capital, a privately held investment banking firm. Gibson is also on the boards of MarketAxess and Viterbo University, and was previously on the boards of University of Miami and Lululemon Athletica.

== Early life and education ==
Gibson was born at St. Luke's Memorial Hospital in Racine, Wisconsin on July 5, 1981. She attended J.I. Case High School in Racine, where she was an honors student and captain of the cheerleading squad. She turned down a full ride at University of Wisconsin and other universities to attend University of Miami.

She received an MBA from the Kellogg School of Management at Northwestern University and a BBA from the University of Miami. Gibson originally intended to study to become a bilingual pediatrician, but decided to pursue business while studying at the University of Miami.

== Career ==
Gibson began interning at Loop Capital in 1997, the year the company was founded. Gibson subsequently held various executive roles at the company, including heading its global equity division. In 2015, Crain's Chicago Business included Gibson on its 40 Under 40 list.

In 2016, she was elected president of Loop Capital, succeeding company co-founder Albert R. Grace, Jr.

In November 2020, Lululemon added Gibson to the company's board of directors. That same year, Gibson joined the board of directors for financial services company MarketAxess.

In 2021, she partnered with Google and Goldman Sachs to promote racial equity. The partnership between Loop Capital and Google was part of Goldman Sach's "One Million Black Women" initiative, which aims to reduce the racial wealth gap.

She is frequently featured as an expert on finance and cryptocurrency in publications such as Crain's Chicago Business and Markets Insider. She spoke at the 2021 Women in Leadership Symposium at University of Wisconsin–Madison. She is also a featured expert on retirement in publications like The Washington Post, Plan Sponsor, and P&I.

Gibson joined TIAA in June 2022, and is currently the company's Chief Client Officer and Senior Executive Vice President. In this role, she leads TIAA's core retirement business, which represents $740 billion of the firm’s $1.2 trillion in assets under management. She oversees strategies and services for plan sponsors in the government, academic, medical and cultural industries. In 2024, she was one of Barron's "100 Most Influential Women in Finance", and a recipient of the Diversity, Equity and Inclusive Capitalism Power100 Award.

== Other work ==
Gibson is also a member of The Economic Club of Chicago and serves on the Finances Committee of Viterbo University. She previously sat on the board of trustees at the University of Miami, where she was on the executive committee and investment committee, and was a member of the Treasury Market Practices Group sponsored by the Federal Reserve Bank of New York.

== Philanthropy ==
In 2017, Gibson made an endowment to Viterbo University for the foundation of the Nola Starling Recital Hall, named after Gibson's mother, an alumna of Viterbo University.

In 2013, she established the Kourtney K. Ratliff Endowed Scholarship Fund at the University of Miami. The fund sponsors the Kourtney K. Ratliff Scholarship for Academic Excellence, which is awarded to African-American students from the Midwest who major in business.

Gibson is a board member, and former chairman, of the Chicago Scholars Foundation and a board member of the Dibia Dream Foundation.

== Personal life ==
Gibson is married and has four children. In an interview with UCAN Chicago, she said that her primary motivation is "faith and family", saying "I feel like I need to be successful in order to make sure that I can make my family successful and generations to come."

Gibson currently resides with her family in Charlotte, North Carolina and Chicago, Illinois. She is an avid runner.
