= Texas Stadium =

Former stadium in Irving, Texas, U.S.

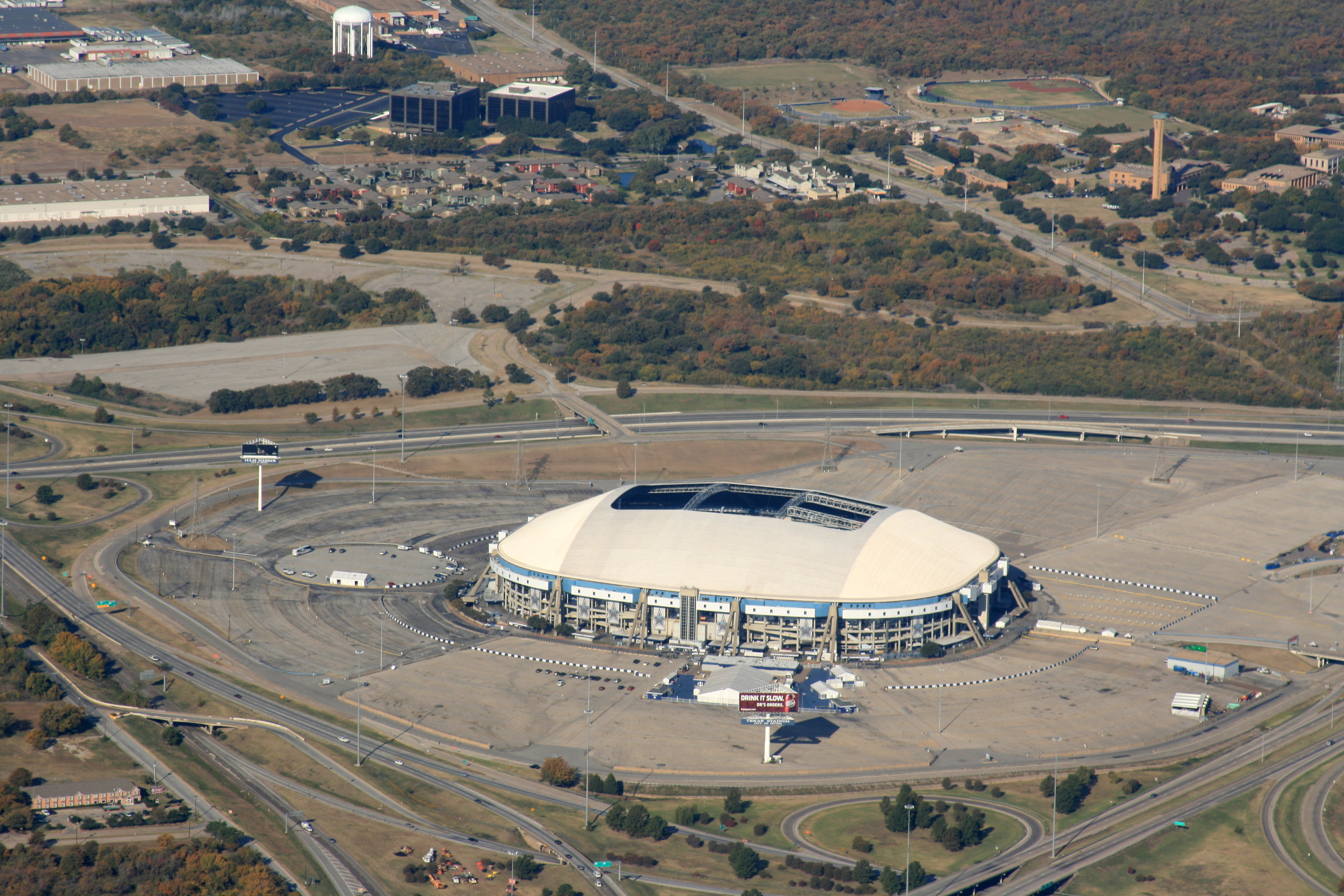
- Texas Stadium in November 2008
- Interactive map of Texas Stadium
- Location: 2401 East Airport Freeway; Irving, Texas, U.S.
- Coordinates: 32°50′23″N 96°54′39″W
- Owner: City of Irving
- Operator: Texas Stadium Corp
- Capacity: 65,675
- Surface: Artificial turf: Texas Turf (1971–1995); AstroTurf (1996–2002); RealGrass (2002–2008)

Construction
- Groundbreaking: January 26, 1969
- Opened: October 24, 1971
- Closed: December 20, 2008
- Demolished: April 11, 2010
- Cost: US$35 million ($278 million in 2025 dollars)
- Architect: A. Warren Morey
- General contractor: JW Bateson Co., Inc.

Tenants
- Dallas Cowboys (NFL) (1971–2008); Dallas Tornado (NASL) (1972–1975, 1980–1981); SMU Mustangs (NCAA) (1979–1986)

Texas Stadium (the United States)

Texas Stadium was an American football stadium located in Irving, Texas, a suburb west of Dallas. Opened on October 24, 1971, it was known for its distinctive hole in the roof, the result of abandoned plans to construct a retractable roof.

The stadium was the home field of the NFL's Dallas Cowboys for 38 seasons, through 2008, and had a seating capacity of 65,675. In 2009, the Cowboys moved to Cowboys Stadium (now AT&T Stadium) in nearby Arlington.

Texas Stadium was demolished on April 11, 2010, by a controlled implosion.

== History ==
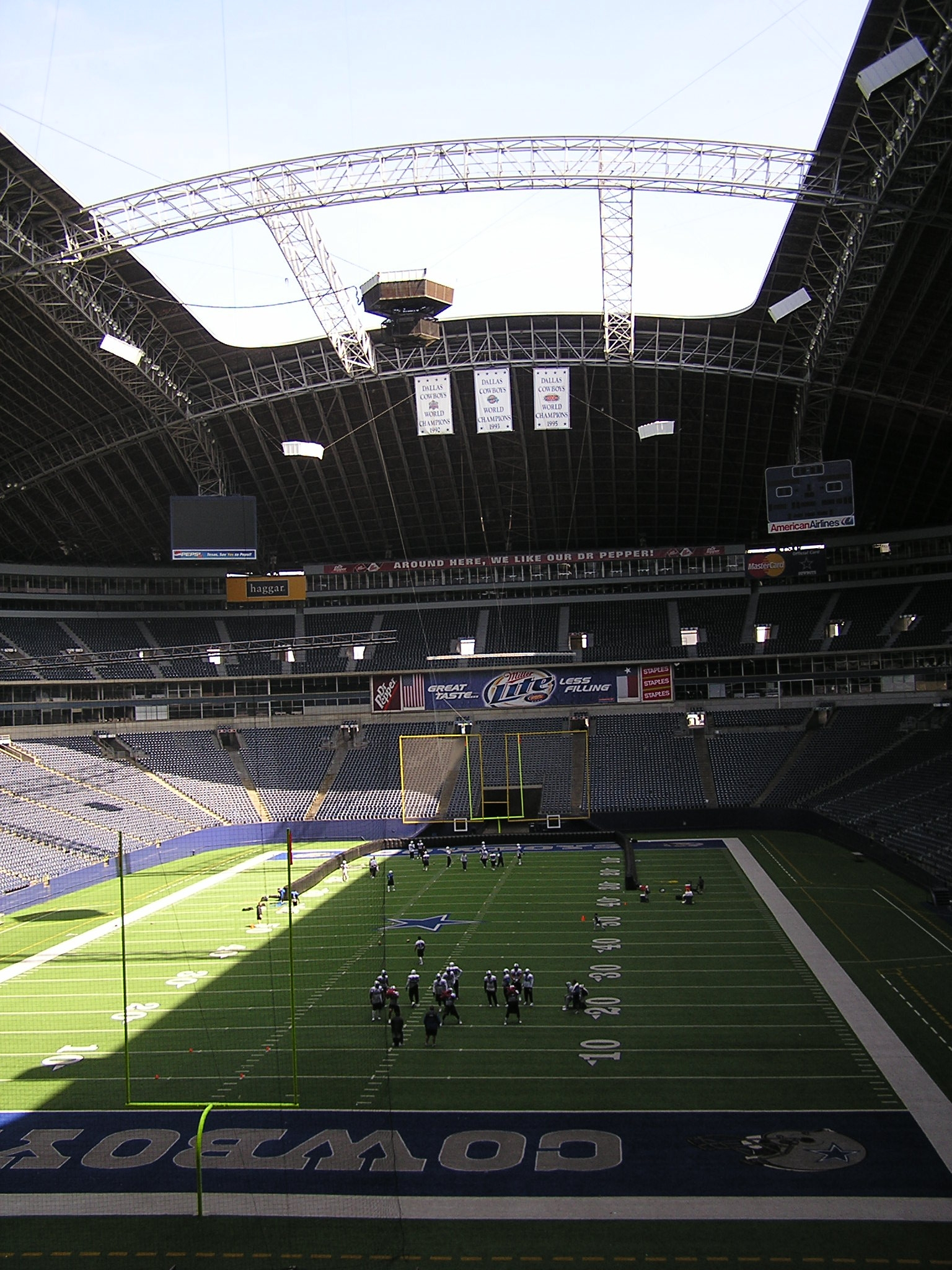
Interior, 2007

The Cowboys had played at the Cotton Bowl in Dallas since their inception in 1960. However, by the mid-1960s, founding owner Clint Murchison, Jr., felt that the Fair Park area of the city had become unsafe and downtrodden, and did not want his season ticket holders to be forced to go through it. Murchison was denied a request by mayor Erik Jonsson to build a new stadium in downtown Dallas as part of a municipal bond package.

Murchison envisioned a new stadium with sky boxes and one in which attendees would have to pay a personal seat license as a prerequisite to purchasing season tickets. With two games left for the Cowboys to play in the 1967 season, Murchison and Cowboys general manager Tex Schramm announced a plan to build a new stadium in the northwest suburb of Irving.

Texas Stadium, along with Schaefer Stadium (1971), Arrowhead Stadium (1972), Rich Stadium (1973), and the Pontiac Silverdome (1975), was part of a new wave of football-only stadiums (all with artificial turf) built following the AFL–NFL merger. More so than its contemporaries, Texas Stadium featured a proliferation of luxury boxes, which provided the team with a large new income source exempt from league revenue sharing.

It hosted its first Cowboys game on October 24, 1971, a 44–21 victory over the New England Patriots, and became an icon of the Cowboys with their rise in national prominence. The Cowboys entered the season as defending NFC champions and won their first world title in Super Bowl VI in January 1972. The field was surrounded by a blue wall emblazoned with white stars, an iconic design that was replicated in its successor, AT&T Stadium. In its inaugural season in 1971, the wall was plain concrete gray. It was painted blue for the 1972 season, and the white stars were added in 1975.

Texas Stadium's field alignment (between the goal posts) was southwest-to-northeast, perpendicular to the Cotton Bowl, which is southeast-to-northwest.

=== Roof ===
The most distinctive element of Texas Stadium was its partial roof, the only one in the NFL. The roof was originally supposed to be the first retractable roof in the NFL. However, it was discovered that the structure could not support the additional weight. This resulted in a partial roof that covered most of the stands but not the playing field itself. Cowboys linebacker D. D. Lewis once famously said that "Texas Stadium has a hole in its roof, so God can watch His favorite team play".

The open roof allowed snow to cover the field in the Thanksgiving Day game against the Miami Dolphins in 1993. The unusual roof also introduced a unique difficulty in televising games, as sunlight would cover part of the field and make it hard for television cameras to adjust for the changes in light.

The roof was repainted in the summer of 2006 by the city of Irving, the stadium's owners. It was the first time the roof had been repainted since Texas Stadium opened.

=== Other events ===
Football

Texas Stadium hosted five NFC Championship Games. The 1973 Pro Bowl was held at Texas Stadium in front of 47,879 spectators.

The first football game played at Texas Stadium was on October 15, 1971, when Texas Southern defeated Bishop 34–21 in a college football game. The stadium hosted numerous neutral-site college football games and was the home field of the SMU Mustangs for eight seasons, from 1979 through 1986. After the school returned from an NCAA-imposed suspension in 1988, school officials moved games back to the school's on-campus Ownby Stadium to signify a clean start for the football program (since replaced by Gerald J. Ford Stadium in 2000). The 2001 Big 12 Championship Game was held at the site.

In November and December, Texas Stadium was a major venue for high school football. It was not uncommon for there to be high school football tripleheaders at the stadium. Texas Stadium served as a temporary home for two Dallas-area high schools, Plano Senior High School in 1979 after its home stadium was damaged by a prank gone awry, and Highland Park High School while a new stadium on campus was being built.

The stadium has also played host to the two largest capacity crowds for Texas high school football playoff games. In 1977, Plano defeated Port Neches-Groves 13-10 in front of a record crowd of 49,953. In 2006, the matchup between Trinity High School from Euless, and Carroll Senior High School from Southlake, in the second round of the playoffs, ended in a 22-21 Southlake victory (on their way to a fourth 5A state championship in five years) before an announced crowd of 46,339 at Texas Stadium. These games marked two of the top three all-time attendance figures for a Texas high school football game and the stadium recorded three of the top 20 attendance records.

In 1988, Texas Stadium hosted the Class 5A championship game, where Dallas Carter, led by future New York Giants Pro Bowl linebacker Jessie Armstead, defeated Converse Judson 31-14. The University Interscholastic League later stripped Carter of its title due to numerous rule violations. Carter advanced to the final by defeating Odessa Permian 14-9 in the semifinals at Memorial Stadium in Austin in a game highlighted by the book Friday Night Lights: A Town, a Team, and a Dream and its film adaptation.

In 1994, the stadium hosted the John Tyler vs. Plano East high school football regional playoff, whose wild seesaw finish won it the 1995 Showstopper of the Year ESPY Award.

Soccer

In addition to American football, the Dallas Tornado of the NASL used it as their home stadium from 1972 to 1975 and again from 1980 to 1981 when the team folded.

On November 21, 1991, the U.S. Men's National soccer Team played a friendly match against Costa Rica.

| Date | Competition | Team 1 | Team 2 | Score |
| November 21, 1991 | Friendly | United States | Costa Rica | 1-1 |

Supercross

Texas Stadium hosted a round of the AMA Supercross Championship from 1975 to 1977 and 1983 to 2008.

Bull riding

The Professional Bull Riders (PBR) held a Bud Light Cup event at Texas Stadium known as the "Battle of the Bulls" during the organization's first two years of existence (1994 & 1995). In both instances, the event was won by three-time PBR world champion Adriano Morães (in 1994 he was the co-champion along with Pat Yancey). The 1995 event was also notable because of rain which turned the dirt into mud, affecting the performance of several bulls.

Lacrosse

On May 25, 2008, Texas Stadium hosted the first ever professional lacrosse game in Texas when the two-time defending Major League Lacrosse champions Philadelphia Barrage played the Long Island Lizards. The Barrage disbanded after the 2008 season while the re-named New York Lizards remained as a member of MLL's Eastern Conference until 2020 when the MLL merged with the Premier Lacrosse League.

Professional wrestling

From 1984 to 1988, the stadium hosted the annual World Class Championship Wrestling (WCCW) David Von Erich "Memorial Parade of Champions" professional wrestling card every May. The initial 1984 card drew more than 40,000 fans, the highest attendance of any wrestling card in the state of Texas at that time.

Religious gatherings

The stadium hosted religious gatherings such as Promise Keepers and Billy Graham crusades; a Graham crusade was the first event held at Texas Stadium.

From October 17 to October 20, 2002, evangelist Billy Graham held the Metroplex Mission crusade in Texas Stadium. Several Christian musical groups also played during the event. Former president George H. W. Bush gave an introduction for Graham on the first night of the crusade.

=== Concerts ===
| Date | Artist | Opening act(s) | Tour / Concert name | Attendance | Revenue | Notes |
|---|---|---|---|---|---|---|
| July 31, 1974 | Crosby, Stills, Nash & Young | The Beach Boys The Band Jesse Colin Young | CSNY 1974 | 60,000 | — | |
| July 13, 1984 | The Jacksons | — | Victory Tour | 120,000 | $3,564,090 | |
| July 14, 1984 | The Jacksons | — | Victory Tour | 120,000 | $3,564,090 | |
| July 15, 1984 | The Jacksons | — | Victory Tour | 120,000 | $3,564,090 | |
| July 26, 1987 | Madonna | Level 42 | Who's That Girl World Tour | 40,601 / 41,000 | $812,020 | |
| September 17, 1988 | INXS | — | Calling All Nations World Tour | | | |
| October 14, 1988 | George Michael | — | Faith World Tour | 38,564 / 41,000 | $846,923 | |
| April 7, 1990 | Paul McCartney | — | World Tour | 57,337 / 57,337 | $1,863,453 | |
| March 14, 1992 | Willie Nelson; Neil Young; John Mellencamp and many others | — | Farm Aid VI | — | — | |
| May 7-8, 1992 | Genesis | — | We Can't Dance Tour | — | — | This was the opening show to the tour. |
| June 13, 1992 | The Cure | Curve; Cranes | The Wish Tour | — | — | |
| September 5, 1992 | Guns N' Roses; Metallica | Faith No More | Guns N' Roses/Metallica Stadium Tour | 44,391 / 44,391 | $1,220,753 | Faith No More lead guitarist Jim Martin joined Metallica onstage for their cover of the Misfits song "Last Caress". |
| September 24, 1993 | Garth Brooks | — | The Garth Brooks World Tour | — | — | The first show was recorded and broadcast on NBC, titled This is Garth Brooks, Too! (a follow-up to Brooks' 1992 televised concert). It was later included in Brooks' The Entertainer DVD collection, released in 2006. |
| September 25, 1993 | Garth Brooks | — | The Garth Brooks World Tour | — | — | The first show was recorded and broadcast on NBC, titled This is Garth Brooks, Too! (a follow-up to Brooks' 1992 televised concert). It was later included in Brooks' The Entertainer DVD collection, released in 2006. |
| July 3, 1994 | Eagles | Melissa Etheridge | Hell Freezes Over Tour | — | — | |
| October 22, 1994 | Carman | — | — | 71,132 | — | |
| August 14, 1999 | *NSYNC | Jordan Knight 5ive | Boys of Summer Tour | | | |
| November 14, 1999 | Shania Twain | — | Come On Over Tour | 40,000 | — | This concert was filmed for a CBS TV special which aired on Thanksgiving night. |
| July 9, 2000 | Metallica | Korn; Kid Rock; Powerman 5000; System of a Down | Summer Sanitarium Tour | — | — | Metallica lead singer James Hetfield was unable to attend the concert as he hurt his back during a jet skiing accident while in Georgia before the Atlanta show. Metallica bassist Jason Newsted, along with other lead singers from the other bands on hand, sang most of the songs. Metallica did return in August to perform two make-up shows at the Starplex in Dallas a month later. |
| July 15, 2001 | Dave Matthews Band | Angelique Kidjo; Wyclef Jean | 2001 Summer Tour | — | — | |
| August 3, 2003 | Metallica | Linkin Park; Limp Bizkit; Deftones; Mudvayne | Summer Sanitarium Tour | — | — | |

=== In television ===
The stadium appeared in numerous episodes of the television series, Walker, Texas Ranger (1993–2001), which was filmed in the Dallas–Fort Worth metroplex.

The stadium made an appearance on MTV's Headbangers Ball in early 1994, when host Riki Rachtman interviewed Dimebag Darrell, Vinnie Paul and Rex Brown of Pantera on the field in promotion of the band's then-new album Far Beyond Driven; the band and Rachtman then played some football with fans who won a contest to appear on the show.

The stadium appeared in the 1999 movie Any Given Sunday being the home of the "Dallas Knights" in the film.

The stadium has also appeared in the season one finale of Friday Night Lights as a setting for the State Championship game between the Dillon Panthers and the West Cambria Mustangs.

Throughout the network run of the television series Dallas, a number of scenes were filmed on location at Texas Stadium. An overhead shot of the stadium (looking down at the field from the hole in the roof) was also featured prominently as part of the show's opening credits for each of its thirteen seasons on CBS. This trend has continued with the new series with AT&T Stadium taking its place.

=== Seating capacity ===
| Years | Capacity |
|---|---|
| 1971–1972 | 65,000 |
| 1973 | 65,111 |
| 1974–1984 | 65,101 |
| 1985–1988 | 63,855 |
| 1989–1994 | 65,024 |
| 1995–1996 | 65,812 |
| 1997–2000 | 65,675 |
| 2001–2002 | 65,639 |
| 2003–2008 | 65,529 |

=== The Cowboys' departure ===
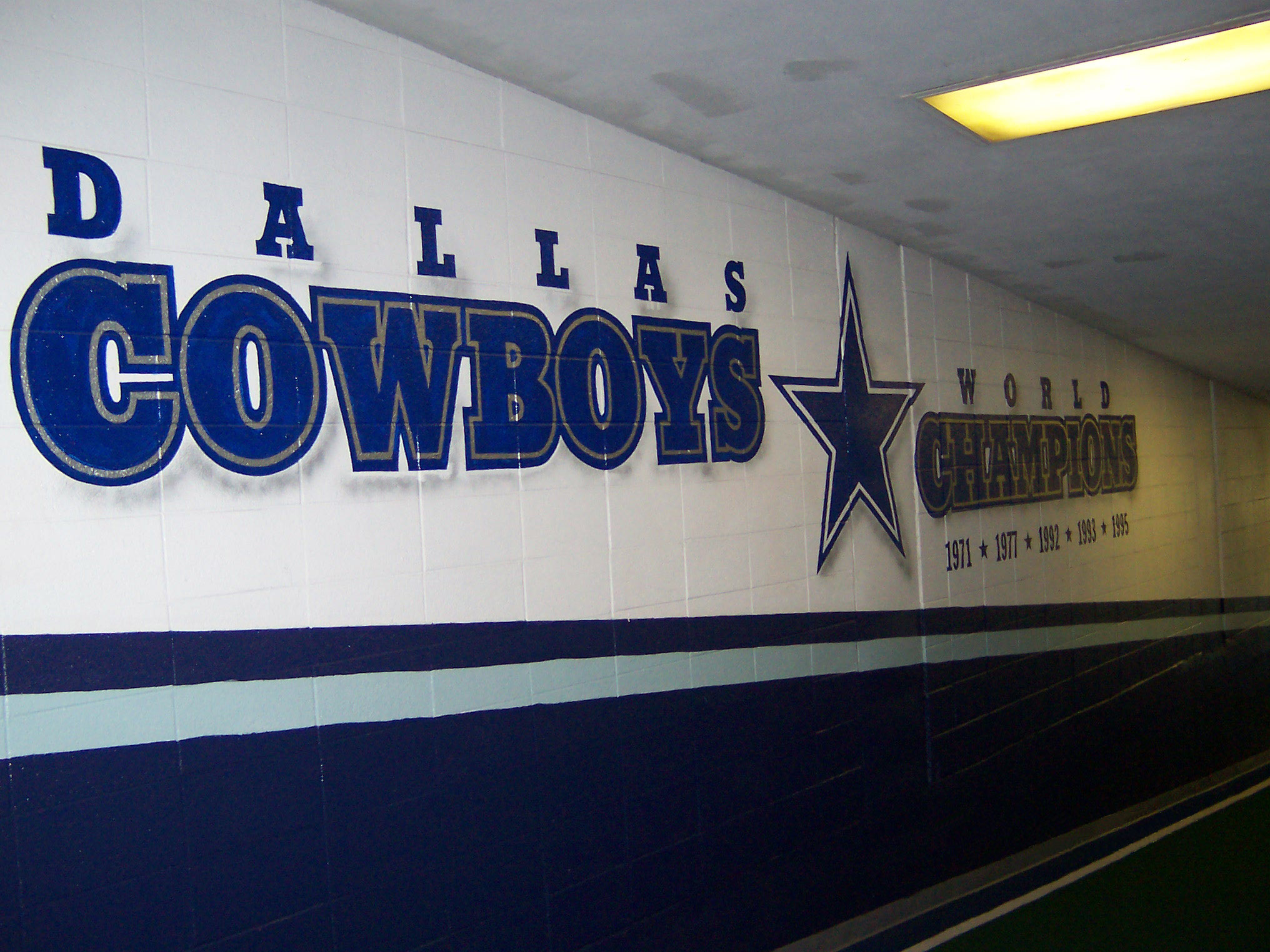
"Five-time Super Bowl Champions Mural" in the Cowboys' tunnel

When opened, the stadium had many amenities that included 381 luxury suites, a stadium club where fans gathered for parties and banquets, and The Corral that provided food, beverages, entertainment and large screen televisions. However, by the 2000s other NFL teams received new stadiums that had more club and luxury seating than Texas Stadium had, so the Dallas Cowboys asked for a new stadium.

The Cowboys left Texas Stadium after the 2008 NFL season for Cowboys Stadium (opened for the 2009 NFL season) that was partially funded by taxpayers in Arlington. In November 2004, Arlington voters approved a half-cent (.005 per U.S. dollar) sales tax to fund $325 million of the then estimated $650 million stadium by a margin of 55%-45%. Jerry Jones, the Cowboys' owner, spent over $5 million backing the ballot measure, but also agreed to cover any cost overruns which as of 2006 had already raised the estimated cost of the project to $1 billion.

The new venue, later named AT&T Stadium, which has a retractable roof system, also includes a setting that mimics a hole in the roof as a tribute to Texas Stadium.

The Cowboys lost their final game at Texas Stadium to the Baltimore Ravens, 33–24, on December 20, 2008.

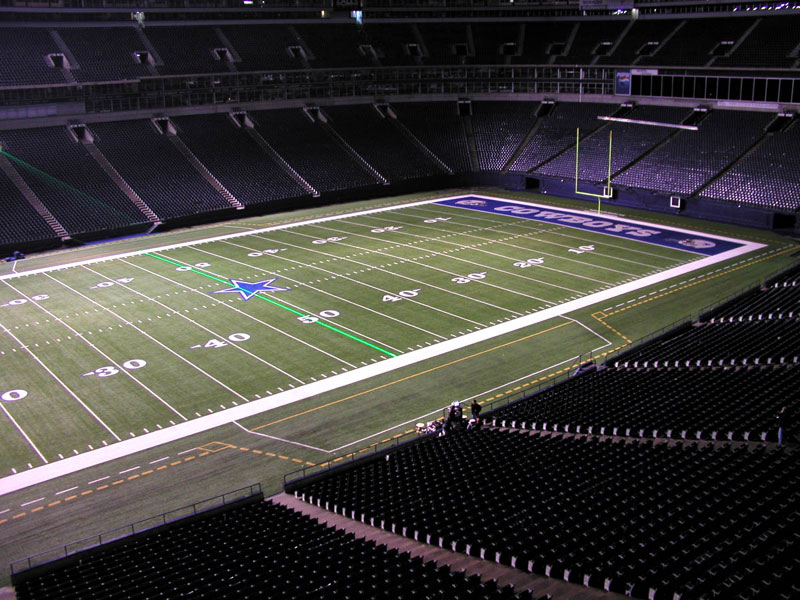
Texas Stadium's interior in 2006

==== Closure ====
The stadium was scheduled for demolition and implosion on April 11, 2010, as confirmed by the mayor of Irving on September 23, 2009.

Many of the items in the stadium were auctioned off by the city and the Dallas Cowboys including the stadium seats, scoreboard and other pieces of memorabilia.

The City of Irving announced that the Texas Department of Transportation would pay $15.4 million to lease the site for 10 years for use as a staging location for the State Highway 114/Loop 12 diamond interchange. The city has the right to relocate the staging area if redevelopment becomes available.

==== Demolition ====
A post-demolition view by WFAA-TV in April 2010

On September 23, 2009, the City of Irving granted a demolition contract to Weir Brothers Inc., a local Dallas based company, for the demolition and implosion of the stadium.

On December 31, 2009, The City of Irving and Kraft Foods announced details of their sponsorship deal for the stadium's implosion — including a national essay contest with the winner getting to pull the trigger that finishes off the stadium. Kraft paid the city $75,000 and donated $75,000 worth of food to local food banks to promote its "Cheddar Explosion" version of Kraft Macaroni & Cheese. The city council unanimously approved the sponsorship deal.

At 7:07 a.m. CDT on April 11, 2010, 11-year-old Casey Rogers turned the key to cause the demolition. From the first explosion, it took approximately 25 seconds for the stadium to completely fall. Debris removal continued until July 2010. Texas's Department of Transportation is using the site as an equipment storage and staging area, after which Irving will decide long-term plans.

In 2013–15, the area around the former stadium was the epicenter for at least 46 small earthquakes, ranging in magnitude from 1.6 to 3.6.

== Las Vegas Sands redevelopment proposal ==
Las Vegas Sands is looking to develop an integrated resort at the site in the event that Texas legalizes casinos. The proposed development could also include a new arena for the Dallas Mavericks which is owned by Las Vegas Sands owner Miriam Adelson. In March 2025, the Irving Zoning Commission approved the zoning changes for the land. The state would still need to change its gambling laws in order for the proposed resort to be built. Shortly after revealing details of the proposed development, Las Vegas Sands dropped the casino proposal from the planned resort due to community opposition.

== Sources ==
- Shropshire, Mike. (1997). The Ice Bowl. New York: Donald I. Fine Books. ISBN 1-55611-532-6
- Murchison, Burk & Granberry, Michael. (2022). Hole in the Roof: The Dallas Cowboys, Clint Murchison Jr., and the Stadium That Changed American Sports Forever. College Station: Texas A&M University Press. ISBN 978-1-64843-096-1

| Preceded by Cotton Bowl | Home of the Dallas Cowboys; 1971–2008 | Succeeded by AT&T Stadium |
| Preceded by Franklin Field; Ownby Stadium | Home of the Dallas Tornado; 1972–1975; 1980–1981 | Succeeded by Ownby Stadium final venue |
| Preceded by Los Angeles Memorial Coliseum | Host of the NFL Pro Bowl; 1973 | Succeeded by Arrowhead Stadium |
| Preceded by Arrowhead Stadium | Home of the Big 12 Championship Game; 2001 | Succeeded by Reliant Stadium |
| Preceded by Kezar Stadium; RFK Stadium; Metropolitan Stadium; Candlestick Park; Candlestick Park | Host of NFC Championship Game; 1972; 1974; 1978; 1994; 1996 | Succeeded by RFK Stadium; Metropolitan Stadium; Los Angeles Memorial Coliseum; Candlestick Park; Lambeau Field |
