= Tim Crowder =

American football player (born 1985)

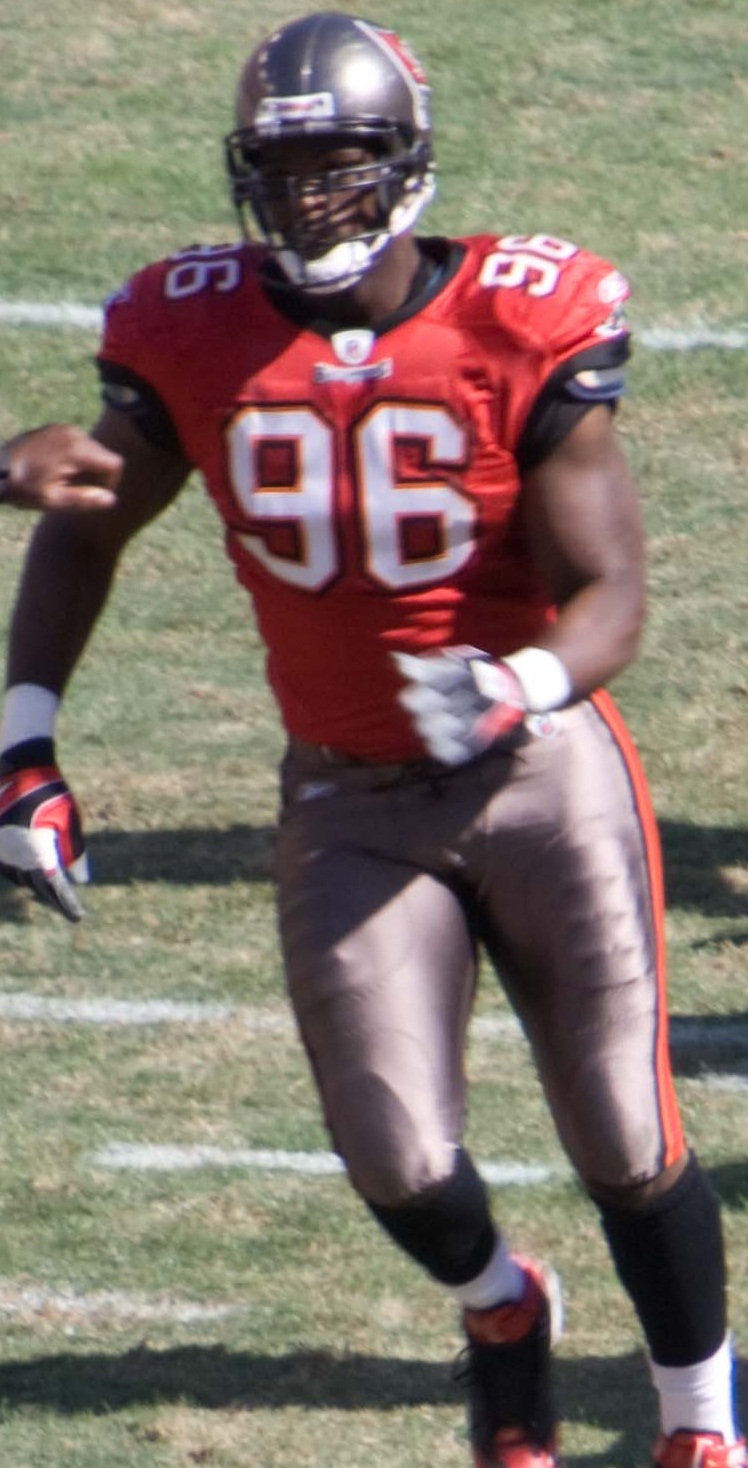
- Crowder with the Tampa Bay Buccaneers in 2009

No. 96
- Position: Defensive end

Personal information
- Born: June 30, 1985 (age 41); Tyler, Texas, U.S.
- Listed height: 6 ft 4 in (1.93 m)
- Listed weight: 260 lb (118 kg)

Career information
- High school: John Tyler (Tyler, Texas)
- College: Texas
- NFL draft: 2007: 2nd round, 56th overall pick

Career history
- Denver Broncos (2007–2008); Tampa Bay Buccaneers (2009–2011)

Awards and highlights
- BCS national champion (2005); 2× First-team All-Big 12 (2005, 2006); Rose Bowl Champion 2005,2006; 2006 Alamo Bowl Champion

Career NFL statistics
- Total tackles: 105
- Sacks: 10.5
- Forced fumbles: 2
- Fumble recoveries: 4
- Defensive touchdowns: 1
- Stats at Pro Football Reference

Timothy C. Crowder (born June 30, 1985) is an American former professional football player who was a defensive end with the Denver Broncos and Tampa Bay Buccaneers in the National Football League (NFL) from 2007 to 2011. He was an All-American defensive end at the University of Texas, where he won a college football championship; and he was selected by the Broncos in the second round of the 2007 NFL draft.

== Early life ==
Crowder was born and raised in Tyler, Texas where he attended John Tyler High School. There he earned 3 letters in football and 4 in baseball. In football, he was all-state and he primarily played defensive end and posted 127 tackles, 22 tackles for loss (TFLs) and 14 sacks in his final two seasons. In baseball he was an all-district pitcher, with a 90mph fastball.

== College career ==
Crowder played college football at the University of Texas at Austin for the Longhorns from 2003 to 2006.

As a freshman, he played in all 13 games and started 9 at left defensive end. For the season, he recorded 35 tackles, 3 TFLs, one sack, one interception, 14 pressures, five passes deflected and two forced fumbles. Following the season, he was named third-team Freshman All America by the Sporting News and shared UT's Outstanding Newcomer of the Year award. He helped the Longhorns make it the 2003 Holiday Bowl, in which he had an interception, and finish ranked #12 in the AP Poll.

As a sophomore, he started all 12 games at left defensive end. For the season, he recorded 47 tackles, 10 TFLs, one forced fumble, 22 quarterback pressures and a team leading 4.5 sacks. He was named honorable mention All-Big 12 by the Associated Press. He was a starter in the 2005 Rose Bowl where he recorded two tackles and the Longhorns beat #13 Michigan.

As a junior in 2005, he started all 13 games, including the Big 12 and BCS championship games, at left defensive end. He led the team with 20 QB pressures, while recording 50 tackles, nine TFLs, three sacks, an interception and, a forced fumble. He was a first-team All-Big 12 selection by the league's coaches, a second-team All-Big 12 selection by The Kansas City Star, an honorable mention All-Big 12 pick by the Associated Press, and a member of the Ted Hendricks Award watch list. He helped the Longhorns win the Big 12 Championship and recorded 4 tackles to help Texas upset #1 USC and win the 2005 BCS Championship.

In his senior year in 2006, he was a team captain and started all 13 games at defensive end, including the 2006 Alamo Bowl. He was 3rd in the Big 12 with 14 TFLs, 4th with 8.5 sacks and 4th with 3 fumbles forced. He also recorded 32 tackles, 2 pass deflections and led the team with 19 tackles for a loss (TFL), 4 forced fumbles and 10.5 sacks. Against Rice that year, he set the school record, and tied the Big 12 Conference record, for TFLs with 7 and also scored a touchdown on a fumble recovery. He was a 2nd Team Walter Camp All-American, chosen as first team All-Big 12 by the AP and second team by the coaches and was twice named the conference's defensive player of the week.

When his college career was over, he played in the 2006 Senior Bowl.

== Professional career ==
Pre-draft measurables
Height	Weight	40-yard dash	10-yard split	20-yard split	20-yard shuttle	Three-cone drill	Vertical jump	Broad jump	Bench press	Wonderlic
6 ft 3 1/2 in (1.92 m)	272 lb (123 kg)	4.69 s	1.59 s	2.71 s	4.43 s	7.28 s	30 1/2 in (0.77 m)	9 ft 3 in (2.82 m)	32 reps	30

=== Denver Broncos ===
Crowder was selected in the second round (56th overall) of the 2007 NFL draft by the Denver Broncos to fit into new defensive coordinator Jim Bates system. He was the second defensive end selected by the club in that draft, and the second player to come from a recent BCS Championship team.

In his rookie year he played in 13 games with 1 start after missing the first three games with an ankle injury. On October 21, 2007, against the Pittsburgh Steelers on Sunday Night Football, Crowder returned a recovered fumble 50 yards for his first and only career touchdown after Ben Roethlisberger was strip sacked by Elvis Dumervil, as Denver would go on to win 31–28. He finished his rookie year with 16 tackles, 1 forced fumble, 3 TFLs, 3 QB hits, 2 fumble recoveries and 4.0 sacks.

In 2008, Bates left the Broncos and Crowder found his role significantly reduced. He played in only 6 games, recording 1 tackle and 2 QB hits.

He was waived by the Broncos at the final cutdown after camp on September 5, 2009.

=== Tampa Bay Buccaneers ===
Crowder was signed by the Tampa Bay Buccaneers on September 14, 2009. In his first year with the Buccaneers, he played in 15 games with 4 starts and recorded a career high 43 tackles, including 37 solo tackles anda career-high 7 QB hits.

The 2010 season was Crowder's most productive. He set career highs for games played (16), starts (9), fumbles forced (1), assists on tackles (9) and tackles for loss (4) as the Bucs went 10-6 and missed the playoffs on the strength of schedule tie-breaker. In a highlight for the season, crowder recovered a Drew Brees fumble to set up the game-winning touchdown against New Orleans.

In 2011, Crowder played in 10 of the Buccaneers first 12 games, but suffered a head injury against Carolina on December 5th and finished the season on the injured reserve.

He was released in the early offseason, on March 22, 2012.

He had tryouts with the New Orleans Saints in September 2012, the Patriots in December 2012 and the Jacksonville Jaguars, at their mini-camp, in June 2013 but never signed with another NFL team.

== NFL career statistics ==
Legend
**Bold**	Career high

Year	Team	Games		Tackles					Interceptions					Fumbles			
Year	Team	GP	GS	Cmb	Solo	Ast	Sck	TFL	Int	Yds	TD	Lng	PD	FF	FR	Yds	TD
2007	DEN	13	1	16	13	3	**4.0**	3	0	0	0	0	0	**1**	**2**	**50**	**1**
2008	DEN	6	0	1	1	0	0.0	0	0	0	0	0	0	0	0	0	0
2009	TAM	15	4	**43**	**37**	6	3.5	2	0	0	0	0	2	0	1	0	0
2010	TAM	**16**	**9**	31	22	**9**	3.0	**4**	0	0	0	0	**4**	**1**	1	0	0
2011	TAM	10	0	14	10	4	0.0	2	0	0	0	0	1	0	0	0	0
		60	14	105	83	22	10.5	11	0	0	0	0	7	2	4	50	1

== Later Life ==
After retiring from football in 2013, Crowder created a training company called Nuclear Athletes in Round Rock, Texas.

Tyler High School hosts a Tim Crowder baseball invitational that is named for him.
