= Allen Wilson (American football) =

American football player and coach

Biographical details
- Born: 1951 or 1952 (age 74–75); Midland, Texas, U.S.

Playing career
- 1971–1973: Abilene Christian
- Position: Defensive back

Coaching career (HC unless noted)
- 1983–1990: Paris HS (TX)
- 1991–2001: John Tyler HS (TX)
- 2002–2011: Dallas Carter HS (TX)

Head coaching record
- Overall: 213–74–3

Accomplishments and honors

Championships
- 4A Texas state (1988); 5A Texas state (1994)

Allen Wilson (born 1951/1952) is an American former football coach. A highly successful high school coach, Wilson won two Texas state championships (1988, 1994) and amassed a 213–74–3 record. His teams are known for their smash-mouth running game.

Wilson is a 1970 graduate of Robert E. Lee High School in Midland, Texas. He went on to play defensive back under coach Wally Bullington at Abilene Christian University in Abilene, Texas, where he was part of the 1973 football team which won the NAIA National Football Championship and Lone Star Conference title.

After serving as a graduate assistant at Abilene Christian, Wilson became head coach at Paris High School in Paris, Texas. He guided them to the 4A state championship in 1988, with a 31–13 win over West Orange-Stark. Two years later, Wilson went on to coach at 5A John Tyler High School in Tyler, Texas.

Wilson brought a new attitude to the J.T. Lions, and popularized "Cujo", John Tyler's playoff persona. Under Wilson, JT began wearing jersey's with "Cujo" inscribed on the front in the playoffs only. Prior to Wilson's arrival, the term "Cujo" was reserved for the defense under former coach Carlous Stone.

Wilson revived a storied program that won two state championships (1930, 1973), but went a mediocre 22–27–2 over the previous five years. In 1994, John Tyler High went 16–0 and won the 5A Division II state championship with a 35–24 win over Austin Westlake. That season included a legendary regional semifinal game against Plano East Senior High School which is considered to be the best high school football game in history. In 2000, the Lions made another finals appearance but lost 35–20 to Katy High School.

In 2002, Wilson took over as head coach of the tradition-rich Dallas Carter Cowboys football program. In 2003, Dallas Carter lost in the Regionals to the Leander Lions. In 2006, Wilson's Carter team eliminated his old school, John Tyler, from the playoffs in only the Lions' second game wearing "Cujo" jerseys since the 2000 season.

Wilson retired after 2011 season. He is a member of the Abilene Christian Athletic Hall of Fame.

== Sources ==
- Mosser, C. Anthony (February 5, 1991). "Paris' Wilson named football coach at John Tyler". Dallas Morning News.
- Cohen, Rachel (April 19, 2002). "John Tyler football coach taking over at Carter". Dallas Morning News.
