= Plano East Senior High School =

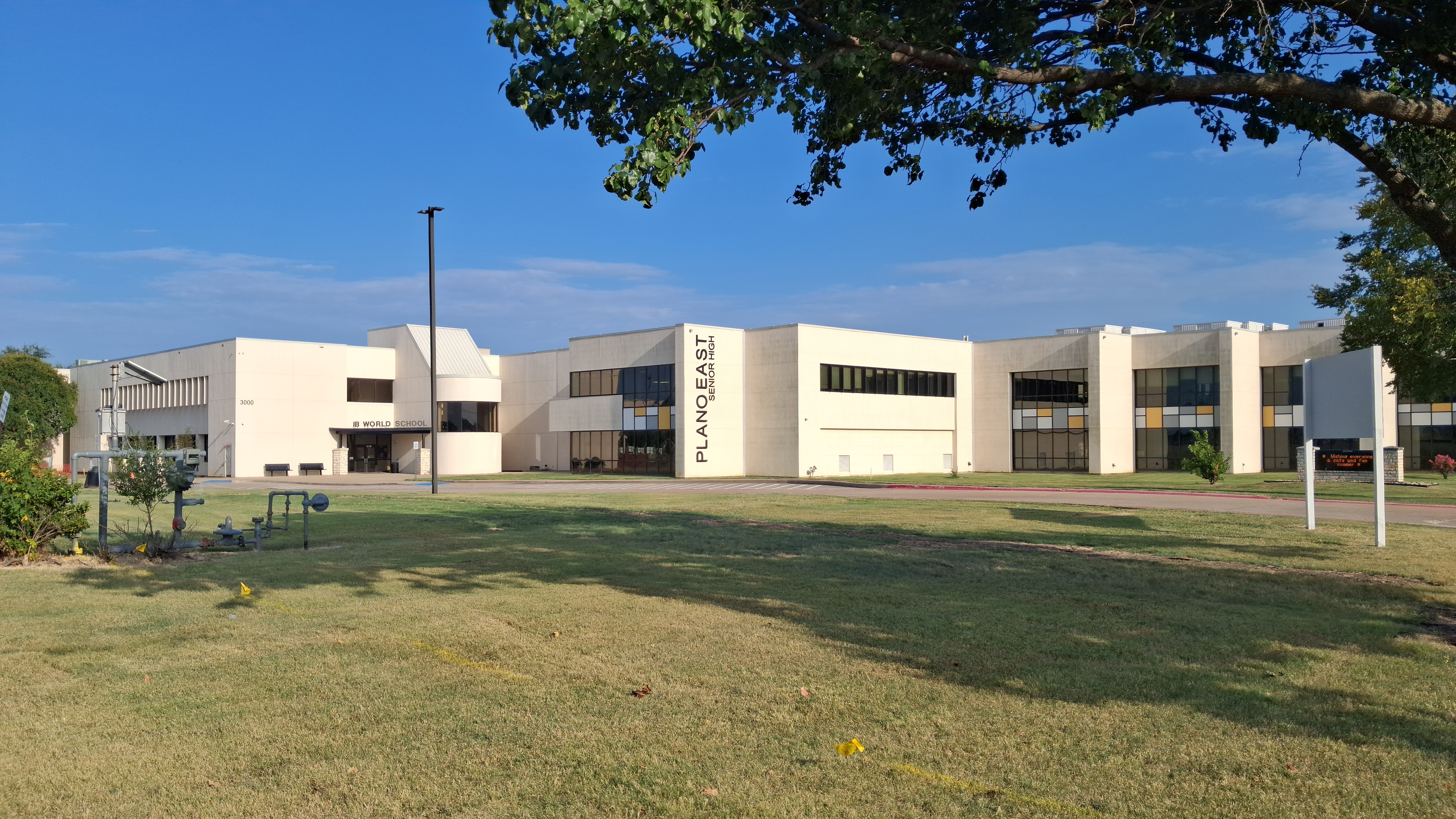
- Plano East Senior High School Reconstruction July 31, 2026.

Location
- 3000 Los Rios Boulevard; Plano, Texas 75074; United States; 33.039586°N 96.645621°W

Information
- School type: Public High School
- Motto: Winning With Class
- Established: 1981
- School district: Plano Independent School District
- Principal: David Jones
- Teaching staff: 173.14 (FTE)
- Grades: 11-12 (High School and Health Sciences Academy) and 9-12 (The IB World School)
- Enrollment: 3,050 (2023–2024)
- Student to teacher ratio: 17.62
- Campus type: Suburban
- Colors: Black and gold
- Mascot: Panther
- Feeder schools: McMillen and Williams
- Website: pesh.pisd.edu

Plano East Senior High School (commonly known as East, Plano East, or PESH) is a public secondary school in Plano, Texas, serving grades nine through 12. It is part of the Plano Independent School District. Students at Plano East attended one of two feeder high schools: McMillen or Williams.

The school colors are black and gold, and the school mascot is the panther. Plano East has been awarded the U.S. Department of Education Blue Ribbon School of Excellence, Best High School in Texas designation by Redbook magazine, Texas Education Agency Blue Ribbon School, and State and National Academic Decathlon Championships.

Plano East's graduating classes are among the largest for high schools not only in the state of Texas, but also in the United States. Plano East's Class of 2005, with 1220 graduates, was the largest high school graduating class in the U.S. that year. The Class of 2014 was also the largest high school graduating class in the U.S., with 1561 graduates.

Plano East is the only senior high school in Plano ISD to offer the International Baccalaureate Diploma Programme. Students who would normally attend either Plano or Plano West are allowed to transfer to Plano East to participate in the IB Programme without forfeiting UIL eligibility.

Beginning with the 2014–2015 school year, Plano East became the 2nd campus to host part of the Plano ISD Health Sciences Academy for Juniors and Seniors after the Health Sciences Academy was established in the 2013–2014 school year at Williams High School for Freshmen and Sophomores.

== History ==
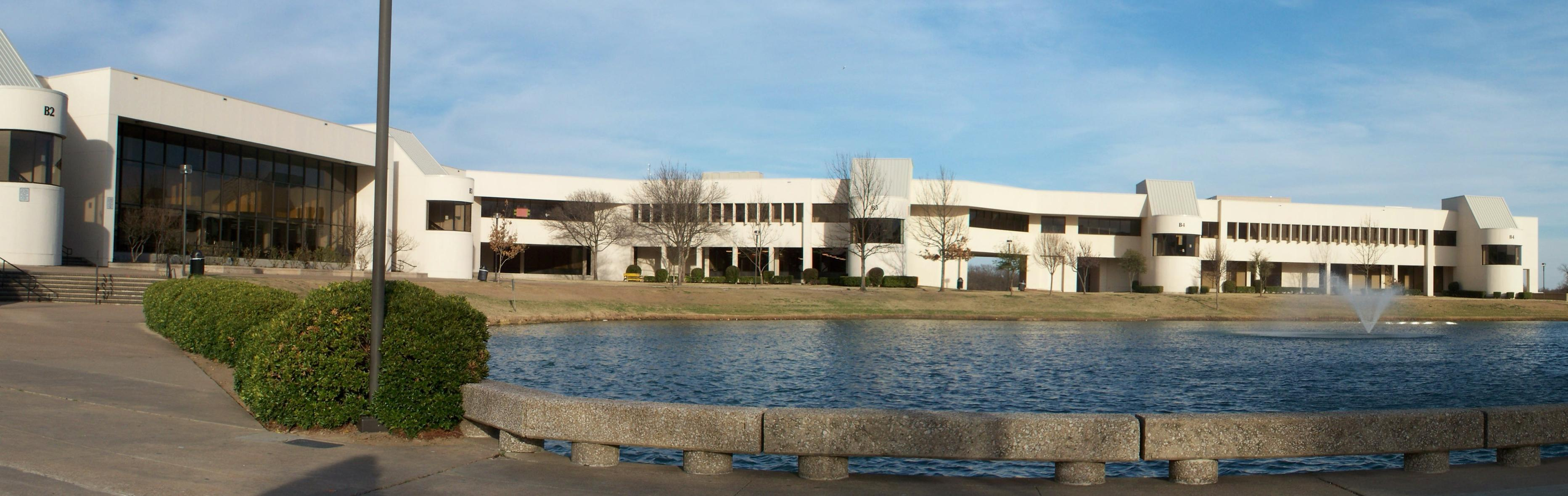
Buildings B2, B3, and B4 as seen from the bridge

To meet the demand of the growing population in Plano, Plano East Senior High School opened in 1981 as the second senior high school in the city. The school opened with 3 academic buildings connected by second-floor walkways, a fine arts building, and a gymnasium. The athletics complex was added as a result of Title IX laws which require equal space for male and female athletics. In 1987, a new student activity center was constructed for indoor athletic practice. Eventually, fourth and fifth buildings were also added. The construction project for Building Five (the science wing) concluded the fall of 2010, preceding the 2010–2011 academic school year. An extension to Building 1 was completed in the fall of 2018 and included 19 classrooms, 4 smaller rooms, a large meeting room, and several collaboration spaces.

== Athletics ==
=== Football ===
District Champs: 1985 12-5A, 1988 12-5A, 1994 11-5A, 1998 9-5A, 1999 9-5A, 2000 9-5A,2023 6A

In 1994, Plano East was on the losing end of a wild and memorable regional semi final game against John Tyler High School in which five touchdowns were scored in the last two and a half minutes (courtesy of three consecutive successful onside kicks, followed by a regular kickoff returned for a touchdown). The game received the 1995 Showstopper of the Year ESPY Award and in 2006, ESPN ranked the game among its top 10 premature celebrations of all time.

=== Basketball ===
The Plano East Basketball is a Division 6A basketball team in Texas.

State Champs: 2024

Plano East's first ever State Championship in any athletic department.

=== Swimming ===
The Plano East Swim Team is a Division 6A swim team in Texas, part of UIL Region 2, District 7. It was added to the 6A category when the category was formed in 2014.

Plano East placed 7th at State in 2005, the highest placement ever for the Plano East swim program.

=== Bowling ===
The Plano East bowling team began in 2001, winning the state title in 2006 and 2010. In the 2005–06 season, Plano East qualified fourth (behind Allen, Plano Senior and McKinney) during district play to qualify for regionals. At the Region II playoffs, East finished second to Allen and qualified for the state playoffs in Houston, Texas. In Houston, Plano East swept Sachse (2–0), Killeen (2–0), Ellison (2–0) and, finally, defeated the defending champions Garland Lakeview 2–1. This was Plano East's first team state title since its creation in 1979. In 2009 the girls team won 2nd in state. In 2010 the Plano East boys varsity bowling team won the state championship for the second time, defeating defending champion San Antonio Madison in San Antonio. In 2011, the girls team won the state championship, defeating Katy High School in the final round.

=== Hockey ===
Plano East Panthers Varsity won the AT&T Silver Division championship in 2006-2007 defeating Plano West 3–1 in the championship. Plano East Panthers JV won the AT&T State Championship in 2014-2015 defeating Lovejoy High 3-1 then repeating another championship the JV Panthers won the City Championship 5-1 Against McKinney High in the 2016–2017 season. Hockey is also not an officially recognized sport by the Texas University Interscholastic League

In 2022, the Plano East Panthers Varsity won the TAHA Division 2A State Championship, defeating Birdville 6–2 in the championship game played in Mansfield on January 23, 2022.

=== Lacrosse ===
Plano East's lacrosse team has played since 1997, reaching the THSLL Division 2 Final Four in 2001, 2004, and 2005. In 2005, the team lost to Plano West 13–12 in the State Championship game. Lacrosse is governed by the Texas High School Lacrosse League and is not a University Interscholastic League-recognized sport. In 2025 they won the THSLL Class C state championship defeating George Ranch 15–11.

=== Orienteering ===
Plano East is home to PISD's only orienteering team. Hosted by the ROTC program, the orienteering team won the North Texas Orienteering Association championship for the competitive year of 2005–2006 as well as the 2006–2007 school year. Members of the team also represented the city of Plano at the National competition both years, in North Carolina and in Maryland where they ranked 4th in the nation on the varsity, and junior varsity level. The Plano East Panther Battalion JROTC Orienteering Team earned a spot at the 2010 United States Interscholastic Orienteering Championships in Batavia, Ohio. The Freshman and Junior Varsity Teams took first place in their respective divisions while the Varsity Team placed 4th overall.

== Academics ==
Plano East Senior High School operates on an 8:00 a.m. to 4:30 p.m. schedule, which includes seven periods and an off-campus lunch where junior and senior students may leave the campus. Most students attend from 9:05 a.m. to 4:30 p.m., but the school offers students the option of attending a "Zero Hour" class at 8:00 a.m. This allows students the option of leaving one class period early.

Plano East offers International Baccalaureate, Advanced Placement, Honors, Regular Level, Special Education and Remedial classes. The school offers 5 foreign languages including American Sign Language, Chinese, French, German, and Spanish. There are JROTC and Health Sciences programs, English as a Second Language classes, and vocational and career track programs.

Plano East National Rankings ranked #3,108 in U.S. News 461st in Newsweek's "America's Best High Schools" in 2011.

The Plano East journalism department houses the school focused student-run newsmagazine and website, Panther Prints.

=== IB program ===
The IB World School at Plano East is a 4-year program that starts in 9th and ends in 12th grade. Students from several Plano ISD middle schools come to PESH to attend the IB program. The 4 years consists of the International Honors Preparatory Program for 9th and 10th grades and the IB Diploma Program for 11th and 12th graders. The IB World School is housed at Building 1 (B1). The IB program consists of a new approach to learning. In 9th and 10th grade, students take a two period class that uniquely combines English and Social Studies: Humanities I (combination of AP Human Geography and English I) in 9th grade and Humanities II (combination of AP World History and English II) in 10th grade. Juniors and Seniors are required to take one subject from each of the six groups:

1. Language and Literature
2. Language Acquisition
3. Individuals and Societies
4. Experimental Sciences
5. Mathematics
6. Arts & Electives

The IB Diploma Program also requires students to take Theory of Knowledge (TOK) starting in their junior year, participate in Creativity, Action, Service (CAS), an extra-curricular program, and write an extended essay of 4,000 words in their senior year. IB Students have the choice of taking certain AP courses instead of IB courses.

=== JROTC program ===
Plano East Senior High has a JROTC program that currently holds the Honor Unit with Distinction (HUD). It has held the HUD for more than 17 years, and as of 2016, the battalion ranks 1st in the state of Texas. The various extracurricular teams consist of the Robotics and Drone Team, Cybersecurity Team, Armed Drill Team, Unarmed Drill Team, Color Guard, Leadership team, Academic team, PT (Physical Training) Team, and Raider Team.

=== Health Sciences program ===
The Plano ISD Health Sciences Academy is a health and science program offered at Plano East Senior High School for grades 11 and 12 at Building 4 (B4) for students interested in pursuing a job in the medical field. Students from the Williams High School Health Sciences Academy come to Plano East for the second half. With a partnership with Collin College, students gain many opportunities: college credits, workforce certifications, working with real medical equipment and communicating with the local medical professionals (through field trips and clinical placements in skill-based classes).

Plano ISD Career and Technical Education offer additional medical courses in Plano ISD Health Sciences Academy than any other school. Extensions of the following classes that are taught at the Health Sciences Academy include:

- Biomedical Science
- Pharmacology
- Practicum/Clinical Rotations
- World Health Research

== Fine Arts and Performing Arts ==
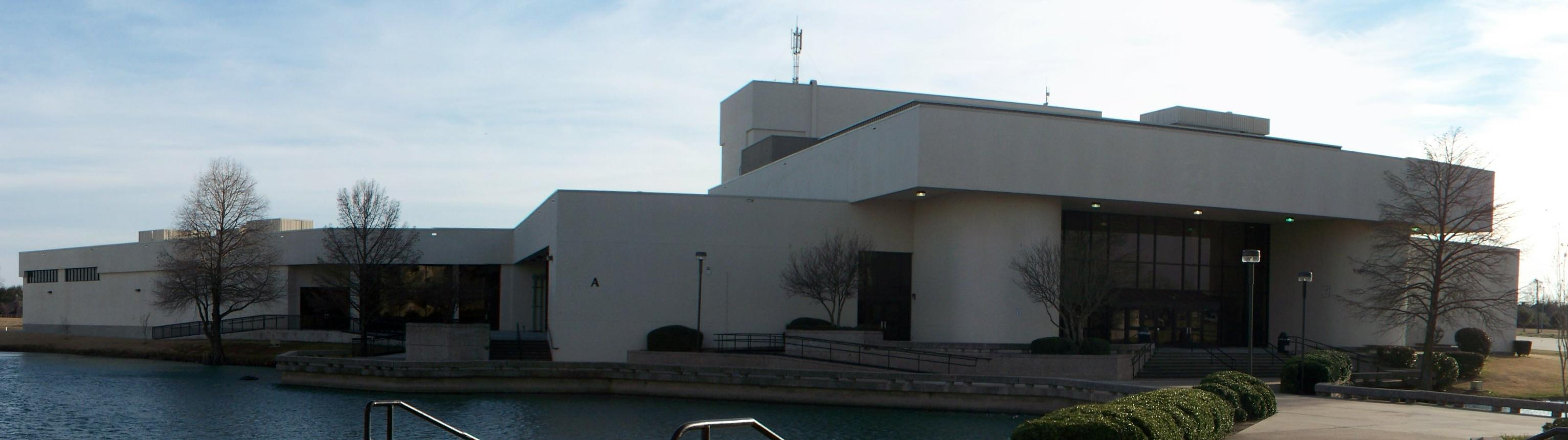
PESH Building "A" houses its fine arts department.

=== Band ===
The Plano East Band consists of four concert bands (The Wind Ensemble, Symphonic Band, Concert Band, and Varsity Band), the Plano East Marching Band, and a jazz ensemble.

The band is one of the most decorated bands in Texas. In 2000, the band was named the winner of the Dale C. Harris Exemplary Band Program Award by the American School Band Directors Association. This distinction is annually awarded to the top band program in the United States. In addition, the band has 40 consecutive years of Superior Ratings and Sweepstakes Awards in the University Interscholastic League (UIL) for marching, concert, and sight-reading competitions, with the band recently being a finalist in the 2024 UIL 6A Area J Marching Contest, getting 10th place. In 2006, the Wind Ensemble was named honor band runner up at the State TMEA Honor Band competition. The Plano East Senior High Marching band has been a finalist in the Duncanville Marching Invitational six times since 1999 and was named Grand Champions in 2001. Additionally, the Plano East marching band was awarded the prestigious Sudler Shield award by the John Philip Sousa Foundation in 2012.

=== Orchestra ===
The Plano East Orchestra is one of the top programs in the state, receiving multiple state and national awards. The chamber orchestra under direction of Betsy Thomas was named as the Texas Music Educators Association (TMEA) High School String Honor Orchestra for the 2010–2011 school year. The orchestra has received the award of Honor Orchestra from TMEA 6 times in the last 12 years, more than any other school in Texas. TMEA restrictions allow the school to participate in the honor orchestra contest only every other year after if they win. The PESH orchestra also won a national competition in 2003 and 2005. Starting in the 2008–2009 school year, the orchestra was no longer allowed by the school district to compete in both the state and a national competition.

=== Choir ===
The Choir Program consists of three main choirs: Mixed Choir and the Men's and Women's choirs. Plano East Choir also has two audition-only groups called Sound Invention and Treblemakers. The choirs put on both a fall and a spring show during the academic year, and Sound Invention and Treblemakers also put on their own themed fall and spring shows. In March 2016, the Plano East Men's Choir was selected to perform at the Southwest Division of the American Choral Directors Association in Kansas City, Missouri. In 2021–2022, the mixed choir was selected as Texas’ best choir by TMEA to perform in San Antonio.

=== Theatre ===
Plano East offers multiple distinct theatre-related programs, including: an advanced Technical Theatre (AT) program, a Theatre Major Studies (TMS) program, a Theatre Honors Production (THP) program, a Musical Theatre Production (MTP) program, a Drama Intensive (DI) program, and an IB Theatre program.

All students are able to take advantage of experts that are brought in for workshops, particularly professionals from neighboring Southern Methodist University, UT Dallas and Collin College, as well as attend the North Texas Drama Auditions if they are in the 12th grade.

The Advanced Technical Theatre students participate in all department productions while learning lighting, set design, stage managing, and sound design. All advanced tech students send submissions into the annual state UIL design competition. In the 2012 season the technical theatre department received six nominations at the state UIL design competition, scoring wins with fifth place in publicity, and fifth place in set design. Plano East also took home the top prize in set design.

Theatre Major Studies is a double block, audition only class, where students focus primarily on performance and script analysis. Students are taught the techniques of Stanislavski, while also learning various movement based skills, such as Viewpoints.

Theatre Honors Production is a single period, audition only class and is similar in structure to the TMS class.

Brand new to Plano East, the Musical Theatre Production class was established in 2016. Students learn about the history of musicals from script to Broadway, while learning choreography from different musicals, singing various showtunes, and exploring the musical side of theatre. This class is also audition only and takes place for one period (5th).

The Drama Intensive program is an audition only program set up for IB World School students in the 9th and 10th grade. Geared to help students get ready for either TMS, THP, or IB, the DI class is involved in the Plano 9th/10th One Act as well as producing their own, unique Drama Intensive show utilizing these students.

Set up for students involved in the IB World School the IB Theatre program allows to earn their SL or HL in this class by learning about Dramaturgy and various styles of theatre across the globe which ultimately culminates in a performance in the Courtyard Theatre at the end of the year, allowing students to showcase their talents by demonstrating a piece they've written by themselves after researching a style of theatre.

The theatre department produces twelve major productions each school year: A Theatre Major Studies show (limited to students in the program), a Theatre Honors Production show (limited to students in the program), the 9th/10th One Act, an open audition musical, a Drama Intensive show (limited to students in the program), six senior-directed one act plays, and the open audition one act.

Plano East's one-act competes annually in the state UIL One-Act Play Competition every spring. In 2006 Plano East won the state championship for their production of The Marriage of Bette and Boo.

== Recognition ==
- U.S. Department of Education Blue Ribbon School of Excellence in 1992-1993 and 1997-98
- Texas State and U.S. National Academic Decathlon Champions
- Redbook magazine Award for the "Best High School in Texas", 1994, 1996
- Texas Education Agency Blue Ribbon School, 1997

== Notable alumni ==
- Lance Armstrong, attended PESH but not an alumnus, graduated from Bending Oaks High School; former professional cyclist and founder of Lance Armstrong Foundation
- Jake Arrieta, MLB pitcher, 2016 World Series champion, 2015 winner of Cy Young Award
- Wes Bankston, former MLB first baseman for Oakland A's
- Justin Blalock, former NFL offensive guard for Atlanta Falcons and 2005 national champion Texas Longhorns, recipient of Watkins Award, inducted into Plano Athletic Hall of Honor
- Spencer Boldman, actor, played Adam on Disney XD's Lab Rats
- Jake Brendel, NFL center for San Francisco 49ers
- Stefani Carter (Class of 1996), Republican member of Texas House of Representatives from Dallas County District 102 from 2011 to 2015
- Robert Evans, Journalist and podcaster
- Dale Godboldo – Television and film actor
- Jimmy King, University of Michigan basketball star for "Fab Five"; played in NBA for Toronto Raptors and Denver Nuggets
- Muhammed Lawal, mixed martial arts fighter and 2010 Strikeforce light heavyweight champion
- John Leake, former NFL linebacker for Atlanta Falcons
- Ismail Mahdi, college football running back for the Texas State Bobcats
- Thomas Mann, actor
- Guy Mezger, former Plano East wrestler, mixed martial arts fighter and UFC champion
- Lee Nguyen, 2005 Gatorade High School Soccer Player of the Year, midfielder for Los Angeles FC of Major League Soccer
- Toben Opurum, former NFL running back
- Tyler Owens, college football safety for the Texas Tech Red Raiders
- Candice Patton (Class of 2003), actress, plays Iris West in The CW television series The Flash and Tori in BET series The Game
- Charlie Peprah, former NFL defensive back, member of Super Bowl XLV champion Green Bay Packers
- Keenan Robinson, former NFL linebacker for Washington Redskins and New York Giants
- Stuart Sikes, recording engineer and studio owner
- Cara Santa Maria, science educator
- Nicolas Valcik, 1989, author, higher education administrator, and judoka
- Alex Waits, former NFL punter
- Terrence Wheatley, former NFL defensive back
- Dave Williams, lead singer of Drowning Pool
- Chad Wolf, former Secretary of Homeland Security under Donald Trump
- Matt Young, former MLB outfielder
