= Eleanor Roosevelt High School (New York City) =

Public school in New York City

Location
- 411 East 76th Street; New York, NY 10021; United States; 40°46′13″N 73°57′12″W

Information
- Type: Public, Secondary, College Preparatory
- Established: September 2002
- Principal: Rigoberto Sargeant
- Grades: 9-12
- Enrollment: Approx. 500
- Website: www.erhsnyc.org

Eleanor Roosevelt High School is a small public high school on the Upper East Side of Manhattan in New York City. Eleanor Roosevelt High School is composed of about 33 teachers and 500 students representing over 40 countries. Initially opened at a temporary location in Chelsea, with 105 ninth graders and a staff of eight, ERHS currently has over 500 students and over 45 staff members. Every year, the school selects 125 to 140 students out of over 6,000 applicants and is often selected over specialized high schools by students looking for a more liberal curriculum. In 2021, Eleanor Roosevelt High School was ranked the 81st best public high school in the nation by U.S. News & World Report.

== Academics ==
Eleanor Roosevelt High School offers a comprehensive college preparatory program with Advanced Placement (AP) offerings, electives, and opportunities for college credit.

Advanced Placement Course Offerings

Current List (2024–25):

- AP Biology
- AP Calculus AB
- AP Calculus BC
- AP Chemistry
- AP Computer Science Principles
- AP English Language and Composition
- AP English Literature and Composition
- AP French Language and Culture
- AP Macroeconomics
- AP Physics 1
- AP Psychology
- AP Statistics
- AP United States History
- AP World History: Modern

All students are required to take the AP World History: Modern course in the 10th grade and the AP United States History course in the 11th grade. Students graduating middle school with a New York Regents Examinations credit in United States History & Government may opt to take AP Art History in place of the Advanced Placement course in U.S. History.

In 2019-20, due to course revisions, the AP World History course title was changed to AP World History: Modern.

Retired or Demand-Based Offerings:

- AP 2-D Art & Design (Held 2008-13)
- AP 3-D Art & Design (Held 2008-13)
- AP Art History (Held 2010-24)
- AP African American Studies
- AP Comparative Government and Politics (Held 2005-11; 2013–24)
- AP Drawing (Held 2008-13)
- AP European History (Held 2010-13)
- AP Music Theory (Held 2005-17; 2021)
- AP Physics B (Held 2012-13)
- AP Physics C: Mechanics (Held 2018-22)
- AP Spanish Literature and Culture (Held 2005-08; 2010, 2012, 2014, 2019)

Other College-Level Offerings:

- Advanced STEM Research I
- Advanced STEM Research II
- Advanced Sculpture
- College English (via St. John's University)
- College Algebra
- Discrete Math
- Spanish IV

== Extracurricular Activities ==
Varsity Sports

ERHS is a member of the Public Schools Athletic League (PSAL).

- Baseball (Men)
- Basketball (Men)
- Basketball (Women)
- Softball (Women)
- Soccer (Men)
- Soccer (Women)
- Tennis (Men)
- Tennis (Women)
- Track and field (Co-ed)
- Volleyball (Women's)

Club Sports

- Cross Country (Co-ed)
- Baseball (Men's)
- Softball (Women's)
- Fencing (Co-ed)

Student Organizations (Fall 2024-25)

- Art 4 Heart Club
- Asian Culture Club
- Badminton Club
- Best Buddies Club
- Black, Indigenous, and People of Color (BIPOC) Student Union
- Cheerleading & Dance Club
- Chess Club
- Choir
- Club de Español (Spanish Language and Culture Club)
- Culinary Club
- Debate Team
- FEM X MIND
- Finance, Entrepreneurship, and Investment Club
- Fitness and Nutrition Club
- Gender-Sexuality Alliance (GSA)
- Green Team
- Girls Leading Our World (G.L.O.W.)
- Jazz Ensemble
- Jewish Culture Club
- Karaoke Club
- Law Team
- Makers Club
- Model United Nations
- The ElRo PawCast
- The ElRo PawPrint (Newspaper)
- Percussion Club
- Ping Pong Club
- Poetry Club
- Pre-Medical Club
- Roosevelt Racers
- Stargazer & Literary Magazine
- STEM Club & Science Olympiad
- Student Government
- Tech Club
- The Making Club
- Yearbook Club
- Young Life Club

== Notable alumni ==
- Sterling Jerins (Class of 2022)
