= Suncoast Community High School =

Location
- 1717 Avenue S Riviera Beach, Palm Beach, Florida 33404; United States of America; 26.778778°N 80.081891°W

Information
- Other name: SHS
- School type: Public, Magnet high school
- Motto: "We Are The World"
- Established: 1955
- School district: Palm Beach County School District
- CEEB code: 101466
- Principal: Kathryn Koerner
- Teaching staff: 124
- Grades: 9-12
- Enrollment: 1569 (2021-22)
- Capacity: 1714
- Schedule type: Block
- Campus size: 294,344 sq. ft
- Colors: Green; Gold
- Mascot: Lance the Charger
- Accreditations: Southern Association of Colleges and Schools, Florida Department of Education, International Baccalaureate, National Association for College Admission Counseling, Blue Ribbon Schools Program
- USNWR ranking: #98
- Publication: Syzygy, literary magazine
- Newspaper: The Legend
- Yearbook: Renaissance
- Budget: $12,545,593 (2016-17)
- Band: Chargersonic Sound
- Website: Official website

Suncoast Community High School (abbreviated SHS) is a public magnet high school (grades 9–12) in Riviera Beach, Florida. The school's campus was built in 1955 as Riviera Beach High School. It was desegregated in the 1960s and renamed in 1970. It became a magnet school in 1989 and has selective admissions.

Suncoast Community High School's students belong to one or more of the school's four magnet programs: Math, Science, and Engineering (MSE), Computer Science (CS), International Baccalaureate (IB), or Innovative Interactive Technology (IIT). The school's teams compete as the Chargers.

== History ==
The school campus was built in 1955 as Riviera Beach High School. During the 1950s and 1960s, Riviera Beach High School was known for both its academics and its athletics. The Riviera Beach High Hornets were particularly strong in men's basketball, with games against rival Palm Beach High School routinely drawing packed crowds.

=== Conversion to a magnet school ===
Suncoast was the target of an investigation beginning June 2, 1987 by the U.S. Department of Education's Office for Civil Rights. The investigation began after parents complained in a letter-writing campaign to state and federal officials that the School Board and then-Superintendent Tom Mills allegedly allowed Suncoast and John F. Kennedy Junior High to become segregated black schools, allowing enrollment to decline and facilities to become run down. Two years earlier Mills had proposed busing white students from southern Jupiter to integrate Suncoast, but Jupiter parents opposed the plan and it was dropped.

In 1989 Suncoast, along with Atlantic High in Delray Beach and S.D. Spady Elementary School, became a magnet school. The institution of magnet programs was originally opposed by several black organizations and some teachers' unions. The principal at the time was Kay Carnes, who remained Suncoast's principal for 15 years before stepping down at the end of the 2004 school year.

Suncoast students and prospective students were required to apply in late spring, and minimum GPA and new dress code were adopted.

About 150 former Suncoast students left the school this year and moved to either Palm Beach Gardens or Jupiter High School (which the previous school year had enrollments of more than 2000 compared with Suncoast's 666). About 350 Suncoast students stayed.

The introduction of the IB program greatly improved racial balance at the school; in this year of the introduction of the magnet program 71 percent of Suncoast's students were black (despite improving its racial balance by 19.3 percent that year).

=== New Campus ===
By 2009 there was an escalating legal dispute between the school district and the city of Riviera Beach when the city government chose not to renew permits for the sewage and water services for the new facility. The city government stated it was doing this because the school district did not buy land needed to widen a road into the facility. The school district considered suing.

Starting in fall of the 2010–11 academic year, Suncoast Community High School moved to a new campus located at 1717 Avenue S. The campus cost the school district 80 million dollars. The new campus consists of five main buildings: the office, the gym, the cafeteria, the auditorium, and the main student building; an open court; as well as a new football field. The main building is three stories high.

== Academics ==
Students apply to Suncoast via the Palm Beach County School District's Magnet and Choice School Application Form. Applicants apply for a specific program or programs and are admitted into the school by a selective lottery after the top 10 percent of applicants (based upon Florida Standards Assessments (FSA) scores, teacher recommendations, and grades) are admitted. Additionally, students who complete the IB Middle Years Programme at an area middle school, such as John F. Kennedy Middle School, are automatically admitted.

== Programs ==
=== Math, Science, & Engineering ===
The Math, Science, and Engineering Program (MSE) concentrates on mathematics, science — particularly physics — and engineering. Physics courses taken are AP Physics 1, AP Physics 2, AP Physics C: Mechanics, AP Physics C: Electricity and Magnetism and, for MSE/IB students, IB Physics HL. Dual enrollment math courses taken are Calculus II/III, Discrete Mathematics, Linear Algebra, and Differential Equations. Students in the MSE program may also elect to pursue the International Baccalaureate Diploma in their junior and senior years. This results in a major shift of coursework, including the requirement of 6 IB External Assessments, 4 IB Internal Assessments, and 2 IB Oral Assessments. The requirement of a foreign language extends from 2 years to all 4 years of high school, the requirement of IB Theory of Knowledge (TOK), IB Physics HL, and other requirements faced by IB track students.

MSE students complete a science fair project in their junior year, with some moving up to the state science fair and even the Intel International Science and Engineering Fair (ISEF).

=== International Baccalaureate Program ===
The International Baccalaureate (IB) program was adopted for junior and senior years. Students must take "MYP" (Middle Years Programme) classes in their freshman and sophomore years. Foreign language is an IB requirement; Many students dual-enroll with Palm Beach Community College or Florida Atlantic University through the Palm Beach County School District's Dual-Enrollment Program. Regardless of their program, all students participate in MYP classes, giving them the option of switching into IB classes their last two years of high school.

=== Computer Science ===
The Computer Science (CS) program is designed for students who wish to major in the fields of computer science or computer engineering. It aims to teach students skills essential to the aforementioned disciplines; skills such as problem-solving, critical thinking skills, and object oriented design. Core computer science courses include study in the areas of: database design, object-oriented programming, algorithms, data structures, abstraction, program analysis, graphical user interfaces, and applications of computer science to the real world. Through the program, students learn Java and T-SQL.

== Awards and recognition ==
U.S. News looked at the top 500 public high schools to identify the best in science, technology, engineering and math (STEM) education.

Suncoast moved to seventh from ninth on the 2011 High School Challenge rankings of American high schools. The national list, which has been compiled by education columnist Jay Mathews since 1998, takes the total number of Advanced Placement, International Baccalaureate and Advanced International Certificate of Education tests given at a school each year and divides it by the number of seniors who graduated in May or June. The Challenge Index formula is meant to serve not as a measure of the overall quality of a school, but of how effectively a school prepares its students for college, according to The Washington Post website.

The College Board named Suncoast the "Exemplary AP Comparative Government and Politics" program among schools with 1000 students or more, with the world's largest percentage of mastery (passing) scores for that AP exam in 2005.

U.S. News & World Report ranked Suncoast as number 51 in its 2007 list of "America's Best High Schools," with a "College Readiness" score of 70.9 and "Quality-adjusted Exams per Test Taker" at 3.2. The U.S. News rankings were determined first by determined whether each school's students performed better than statistically expected for the average student in their state (on reading and math test results for all students on state standardized tests), and then factoring in the percentage of economically disadvantaged students enrolled at the school to determine which schools performed better than statistically expected.

After this, the performance of black, Hispanic, and low-income students was analyzed to determine whether these groups were performing better than average for similar students in the state. The third step was a "college readiness index" that weighted the Advanced Placement (AP) participation rate: "the number of 12th-grade students who took at least one AP test before or during their senior year, divided by the number of 12th graders, along with how well the students did on those AP tests or quality-adjusted AP participation (the number of 12th-grade students who took and passed (received an AP score of 3 or higher) at least one AP test before or during their senior year, divided by the number of 12th graders at that school). Quality-adjusted AP participation rates was weighted 75 percent and the simple AP participation rate was weighted 25 percent. Notably, however, 11 states and the District of Columbia were excluded from the rankings because of unavailable or insufficient 2005-2006 school-year state test data, and IB tests were not included.

Year	Ranking	Index	Subs. Lunch*	E&E*
2010	#9	9.431	15	87.1
2009	#7	9.113	15	87
2008	#3	10.387	15	85
2007	#5	8.395	17	77
2006	#7	7.532	37	--

"Subs. Lunch" is the percentage of students who qualify for federally-subsidized free or reduced lunch, an indicator of low-income students at the school.

"E&E" is the "Equity and Excellence", the Newsweek name for the percentage of all graduating seniors, who had at least one score of 3 or above on at least one AP test sometime in high school (including those who took an AP test but not an AP course).

In 2013, The Daily Beast released its list of America's best public high schools and ranked Suncoast 9th in the country.

== Extracurricular activities ==
=== Academic ===
Suncoast's National Physics Competition, Computer Programming Team, Speech and Debate, Academic Games, FIRST Robotics Competition (179), Mu Alpha Theta, Academic WorldQuest, and Future Business Leaders of America teams have won competitions at state and national levels.

=== Music ===
The Suncoast marching band, the "Chargersonic Sound," performed at the 2007 New Year's Day Parade in London. The band also performed in Paris on New Year's Day 2008. Currently, students may participate in the Suncoast Concert Chorus, Women's Chorus or the elite a cappella group, The Suncoast Voices. Under the direction of Stephanie Nixdorf, the Choral and Theatre programs have grown to include hundreds of students participating in fully staged musicals and singing events throughout the year.

In 2012-13, the choruses received superior marks at their Music Performance Assessments and the Theater Department was awarded five Cappies at the South Florida Cappies Gala. The Cappies is a theatre critic training program that features an awards gala at the end of the year.

== Athletics ==
Suncoast is a member of the Florida High School Athletic Association (FHSAA), and currently competes in the 2-A division. Varsity sports include Competitive Cheerleading, basketball, baseball, football, tennis, soccer, softball, bowling, volleyball, golf, lacrosse, cross-country, track, water polo, wrestling, and swimming.

=== Football ===
In 1981, the football team reached the state finals, but lost to Palatka 42-2. The football team was the district champion in 1984, 2002, and 2015. Devin Hester, a famous NFL kick returner, played for the Suncoast Chargers.

=== Basketball ===
In the 1980s and 1990s Suncoast was frequently regarded as a state basketball perennial power. The boys' basketball team won state championships in 1984, 1985, 1990, and 2026. The girls' basketball team won a state championship in 1998, with a 32–2 record, only the second girls' basketball team to win a state championship from Palm Beach County according to FHSAA records.

=== Cross-Country ===
The boys' cross-country team qualified for the state meet in 1995, and then for five consecutive years from 1998 to 2002. Then again in 2014. The girls' team won the county meet in 2015. Most recently, the boys' cross-country team qualified for the state meet in 2019.

=== Track and Field ===
The girls' track team won their first state championship in 1995. They were also state champions for four years in a row from 1999 to 2002. The boys' track team was state runner-up in 2001.

=== Volleyball ===
In 1997, the boys' Varsity volleyball team won the Palm Beach County Championship. In 2005, the girls' Varsity volleyball team won the State 4A Championship. In 2014 and 2015, the boys' Varsity volleyball team were the district runner-ups. In 2016, the boy's Varsity volleyball team won the district championship and regional championship but lost in the semi-finals of the state tournament.

=== Swimming ===
In 2002 and 2003, the boys varsity swimming team won the Palm Beach County Championship. Also, in 2002 the boys and girls varsity swimming teams won the district championship. The Suncoast varsity girls swimming team in 2014 won the district championship and placed second at the regional and state championships.

=== Lacrosse ===
The boys Lacrosse team achieved their highest state ranking in 2019 at 77, with an 8–5 record.

Competitive cheerleading

The team won the FHSAA state title in 2014 and were states runners up in 2015 and in 2022 at the NHSCC in Orlando they went to finals for the first time in 2018 they also won NHSCC regionals in 2015 and 2016 and were FHSAA regionals runner up in 2015,2017 and 2022 for the first time ever they went to Nationals/NHSCC in 2016.

== Notable alumni ==
- Willie Beamon (1988) – NFL defensive back
- Dru Castro (1994) – Grammy Award-winning record producer
- Anthony Carter (1978) – Michigan (NCAA Big 10), USFL, and NFL wide receiver
- Barrett Green – NFL linebacker
- Robert Harris – NFL defensive lineman
- Devin Hester (2002) – NFL record holder, Pro Bowler and in the NFL Hall of Fame
- Tony McQuay (2009) – Track and field athlete who competed in the 400m and 4 × 400 m relay in the Olympic Games
- DaJuan Morgan – NFL defensive back
- Richard Rellford – professional basketball player
- Gari Scott – NFL wide receiver
