= Stuart Country Day School =

Catholic school in Mercer County, New Jersey, United States

Stuart Country Day School of the Sacred Heart
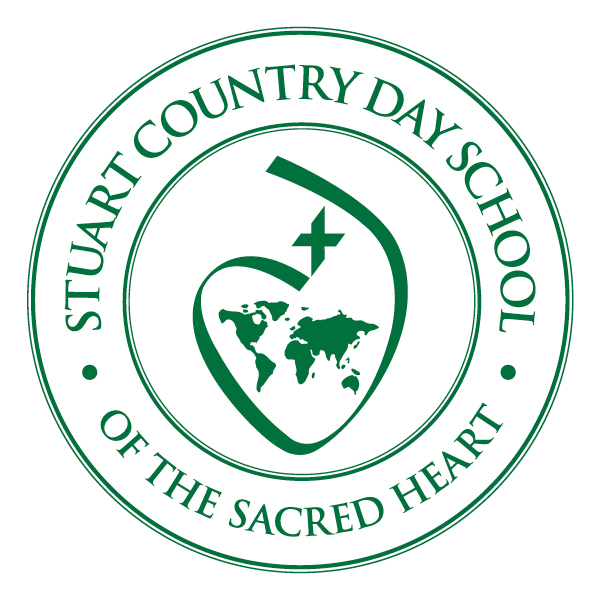

Location
- 1200 Stuart Road; Princeton, Mercer County, New Jersey 08540; United States
- 40°22′4″N 74°41′7″W

Information
- Type: Private, All-Girls
- Religious affiliation: Roman Catholic
- Established: 1963
- NCES School ID: A1902884
- Dean: Kristen Zosche (Upper)
- Principal: Marissa Muoio (Upper); Robert Missonis (Middle); Christine D'Alessandro (Lower)
- Faculty: 67.0 FTEs
- Grades: PS–12
- Student to teacher ratio: 4.2:1
- Colors: Green and White
- Athletics conference: New Jersey Association of Independent Schools
- Mascot: Stuie the Deer
- Team name: Tartans
- Accreditation: Middle States Association of Colleges and Schools
- Newspaper: The Tartan
- Yearbook: La Source
- Tuition: $50,120 (9–12 for 2025–26)
- Business Manager: Rose Neubert
- Admissions Director: Hillary Nastro
- Athletic Director: Chelsea Moran
- Website: www.stuartschool.org

Stuart Country Day School of the Sacred Heart is an independent all-girls Catholic country day school located in Princeton, in Mercer County, in the U.S. state of New Jersey, that serves students from pre-kindergarten through twelfth grade. Stuart is divided into a co-educational Early Childhood Program, a Lower School for junior kindergarten through grade 4, a Middle School for grades 5 through 8, and an Upper School for grades 9 through 12. The school was named for Janet Erskine Stuart.

As of the 2023–24 school year, the school had an enrollment of 283 students (plus 10 in PreK) and 67.0 classroom teachers (on an FTE basis), for a student–teacher ratio of 4.2:1.

Stuart Country Day School has been accredited by the Middle States Association of Colleges and Schools Commission on Elementary and Secondary Schools since 1991 and is accredited until January 2027. It is overseen by the New Jersey Department of Education and is a member of the New Jersey Association of Independent Schools.

== History ==
Stuart Country Day School of the Sacred Heart was founded in 1963 and named for Mother Janet Stuart by a group of women who wished to establish a Sacred Heart school for girls in Princeton, New Jersey. With the help of the Society of the Sacred Heart and local friends, a large tract of woodlands was purchased on The Great Road, and Professor Jean Labatut of Princeton University was appointed architect for the project.

Constructed at a cost of $2 million (equivalent to $21 million in 2025), the school's campus was designed by Labatut to blend in with the characteristics of the terrain, implementing principles developed by Frank Lloyd Wright. Opened for the 1963–64 school year with 98 students, enrollment had climbed to 175 by the following school year.

== Requirements ==
Dedication to service is an integral part of Stuart's foundation and a Sacred Heart education. Created to help students understand the needs of their community and actively respond, the Stuart Community Service Program provides rewarding life experiences that become positive forces in every student's life. All students in the Upper School have an ongoing community service requirement of 50 hours per year. During a student's four years in the Upper School, she spends a minimum of two years working on a community service project outside of school and a minimum of one year involved with the economically and/or socially disadvantaged.

Academic requirements are as follows:

Graduation Requirements (Upper School)

- 8 trimesters of Religious Studies
- 4 years of English
- 3 years of the same Foreign Language
- 2 years of History
- 3 years of Mathematics
- 2 years of Lab Science
- 1 year or equivalent of Fine Arts (Art, Music, Drama)
- 7 trimesters of Physical Education
- 2 trimesters of Health
- 1 trimester of Computer Science

Each student must take a minimum of six courses each trimester and a maximum of eight.

== Academics ==
Stuart is an academically demanding school, and all teachers have very high standards for their students' work. Stuart also offers Advanced Placement Program (AP) courses in a number of fields, including AP Biology, AP Chemistry, AP Physics C, AP Environmental Science, AP Calculus BC, AP Calculus AB, AP Computer Science, AP United States History, AP English Language and Composition, AP English Literature and Composition, AP Spanish Literature, AP French Literature, AP Latin Literature, AP Latin: Virgil, AP Studio Art and AP Music Theory.

Students who enroll in an AP class at Stuart are required to take the AP examination in May. Students enrolling in AP Physics C take both the Mechanics and Electromagnetism portions in the same year. Most commonly, those who took the Honors Pre-calculus class enroll in AP Calculus BC while those in the regular Pre-calculus class enroll in AP Calculus AB.

99% of Stuart graduates immediately go on to enroll in a 4-year college. The Class of 2008 had 28% of its graduating class matriculate to Ivy League schools.

In the Upper School there are wide variety of clubs and student organizations for students to participate in, including Student Government, Mock trial, Model United Nations/Model Congress, Dance Society, DAYS Club, Tartan Tones Musical Group, Tartan Tones Select, The Tartan Newspaper, LaSource Yearbook, Spirit Committee, Thistle Literary Magazine, Mu Alpha Theta, Spirit Committee, Social Committee, Campus Ministry, Outreach Committee, Current Events Club and Admissions Committee.

== Athletic teams ==
The Stuart Country Day School Tartans participate independently in high school sports under the supervision of the New Jersey State Interscholastic Athletic Association. Stuart offers sports teams in the Middle School and the Upper School, the mascot being the deer because when the founders first looked at the property, they saw a deer drinking from the stream in the current "Reflection Garden".

Upper School sports teams include:

Fall Sports:

- Volleyball
- Cross Country
- Field Hockey
- Tennis
- Flag football

Winter Sports:

- Indoor Track
- Basketball
- squash
- ice hockey
- cheerleading
- swimming

Spring Sports:

- Track and Field
- Lacrosse
- Golf
- Soccer
- fencing

Although Stuart's offering of athletic teams is limited, student athletes represent the school in competitions for winter track and other sports. All students who try out for a team are accepted to either the Varsity or Junior Varsity team, no one is cut completely from participation.

Led by coach Katie Grant, the 2007 field hockey team won the Mercer County Tournament and shared the state Prep championship after a 2–2 tie with Lawrenceville School. The team won the Mercer County tourney over top-seeded Allentown High School in 2005, its first title since 1995 and the team's first unshared championship.

The tennis team won the 2005 Prep B championship.

The cross country team won the state Prep B championship in 2005 under the guidance of coach Robert Abdullah, marking their fourth consecutive title. In 2007, Abdullah's track and field team won its sixth consecutive Prep B title.

In 2008, the lacrosse team defeated Rutgers Preparatory School by a score of 16-8 to win its fourth consecutive Prep B championship. Aiming for a fifth consecutive title in 2009, Stuart lost to Morristown-Beard School in overtime, by a final score of 13-10.

== Notable alumni ==
- Abigail Borah (born c. 1990, environmental activist who co-founded Race to Replace Vermont Yankee
- Michele Cooke (class of 1985), geoscientist and professor at the University of Massachusetts Amherst
- Suzanna Love (born 1950), actress
- Ellen Susman (born 1950, class of 1968), journalist, philanthropist, political appointee and television producer.\
- La'Keisha Sutton (born 1990), professional basketball player for the Harlem Globetrotters

== Notable faculty ==
- Barbara Boggs Sigmund (1939-1990), Mayor of Princeton Borough, Mercer County Freeholder and daughter of Congresswoman Lindy Boggs and Congressman Hale Boggs from Louisiana, who had taught Latin at Stuart earlier in her career.
