= AP Physics =

College Board examinations

Advanced Placement (AP) Physics is a set of four courses offered by the College Board as part of its Advanced Placement program:

- AP Physics C: Mechanics, an introductory college-level course in mechanics;
- AP Physics 1, an alternative to AP Physics C: Mechanics that avoids calculus but includes fluids;
- AP Physics C: Electricity and Magnetism, an introductory calculus-based treatment of electromagnetism; and
- AP Physics 2, a survey of electromagnetism, optics, thermodynamics, and modern physics.

Each AP course has an exam for which high-performing students may receive credit toward their college coursework.

== Curriculum ==
=== AP Physics 1 and C: Mechanics ===
AP Physics C: Mechanics and AP Physics 1 are both introductory college-level courses in mechanics, covering similar content, with the former recognized by more universities. The College Board recommends that students taking AP Physics C: Mechanics should be concurrently enrolled in a calculus course, while students in AP Physics 1 should be concurrently enrolled in Algebra 2; a prior high school physics course is not required or recommended, as both courses are designed to be introductory.

The AP Physics C: Mechanics exam includes a combination of conceptual questions, algebra-based questions, and calculus-based questions, while the AP Physics 1 exam includes only conceptual and algebra-based questions. Both exams have the same number of multiple-choice questions and have identical free-response formats.

Both exams cover a similar mixture of topics, focusing primarily on Newtonian mechanics, kinematics, rotation, and oscillation. In addition, AP Physics 1 covers selected topics from fluid mechanics such as density, pressure, buoyancy, and flow, while AP Physics C: Mechanics instead covers calculations involving air resistance, multiple-spring systems, the shell theorem, and physical pendulums.

The course topics are grouped into distinct units, and the weightings of each unit on the exams are as follows:

Exam Weighting
Topic	Physics C: Mech	Physics 1
Kinematics	10–15%	10–15%
Force and Translational Dynamics	20–25%	18–23%
Work, Energy, and Power	15–25%	18–23%
Linear Momentum	10–20%	10–15%
Torque and Rotational Dynamics	10–15%	10–15%
Energy and Momentum of Rotating Systems	10–15%	5–8%
Oscillations	10–15%	5–8%
Fluids	–	10–15%

=== AP Physics 2 and C: Electricity and Magnetism ===
AP Physics C: Electricity and Magnetism and AP Physics 2 introduce topics from the second course in a standard college-level physics sequence. High school students who have already completed a first course in mechanics, such as AP Physics C: Mechanics or AP Physics 1, often proceed to either AP Physics C: Electricity and Magnetism or AP Physics 2, with the former recognized by more universities.

The AP Physics C: Electricity and Magnetism exam (known as "E&M" for short) includes a combination of conceptual questions, algebra-based questions, and calculus-based questions, while the AP Physics 2 exam includes only conceptual and algebra-based questions. Both exams have the same number of multiple-choice questions and have identical free-response formats.

Both exams cover core concepts in electromagnetism, such as electrostatics, capacitors, simple electric circuits, magnetism, and induction. However, AP Physics 2 additionally covers thermodynamics, waves, sound, optics, and modern physics, while AP Physics C: Electricity and Magnetism instead covers calculations involving electric flux, inductance, RL circuits, LC circuits, and the equations of Maxwell and Biot-Savart. These topics are weighted on each exam as follows:

Exam Weighting
Topic	Physics C: E&M	Physics 2
Thermodynamics	–	15–18%
Electrostatics	35–60% (Note: In AP Physics C: E&M, this is covered as three units: Electric Charges, Fields, and Gauss's Law (15-25%), Electric Potential (10-20%), and Conductors and Capacitors (10–15%).)	15–18% (Note: In AP Physics 2, this unit is known as Electric Force, Field, and Potential.)
Electric Circuits	15–25%	15–18%
Magnetism and Electromagnetism	20–40% (Note: In AP Physics C: E&M, this is covered as two units: Magnetic Fields and Electromagnetism (10-20%), and Electromagnetic Induction (10-20%).)	12–15%
Geometric Optics	–	12–15%
Waves, Sound, and Physical Optics	–	12–15%
Modern Physics	–	12–15%

== History ==
=== Evolution of AP Physics C and B ===
AP courses were first administered by the College Board in the 1955–1956 school year, with AP Physics being one of the ten courses. To reflect that college and university physics courses use different levels of mathematics, in 1969, the single AP Physics course was split into AP Physics C and AP Physics B. AP Physics C served as a calculus-based course for physical science and engineering students, whereas AP Physics B served as an algebra-based course for life science and pre-medical students. AP Physics A, which would have served as a concept-based course with little to no mathematics, was also planned, but it was never materialized.

AP Physics C and AP Physics B both covered five major content areas: (1) mechanics, (2) fluids and thermal physics, (3) electricity and magnetism, (4) waves and optics, and (5) atomic and nuclear physics. In 1973, AP Physics C was further split into AP Physics C: Mechanics and AP Physics C: Electricity and Magnetism, leaving out the other content areas entirely. Before 2006, students who took the AP Physics C exam paid only once and were given the choice of taking either one or two parts of the exam, but in 2006, the College Board began to charge a separate fee to take each exam. A 2007 study found that passing either exam was associated with greater success in college science courses.

=== Evolution of AP Physics 1 and 2 ===
After the 2014 exam, AP Physics B was discontinued and replaced with two new courses, AP Physics 1 and AP Physics 2, after a study by the National Research Council concluded that AP Physics B was too broad and emphasized computation over conceptual understanding. The new AP Physics 1 and 2 sequence was designed to be taken over the span of two years instead of just one in order to give students enough time to understand the concepts at an appropriate depth. Also in 2014, calculators were permitted for use on all parts of all AP Physics exams, whereas previously they had been permitted on only the free-response questions.

After the implementation of AP Physics 1 and 2, the number of students taking the AP Physics exam doubled from 2014 to 2015, the largest annual growth for any AP course in history. Until 2020, AP Physics 1 covered not only mechanics (including rotational mechanics, not previously covered in AP Physics B), but also sound, mechanical waves, and topics in electricity (including Coulomb's law and resistive DC circuits). Meanwhile, AP Physics 2 covered the other content areas. In 2020, the sound, waves, and electricity topics were removed from AP Physics 1 and were eventually moved to AP Physics 2. In 2024, the unit covering fluids was moved from AP Physics 2 to AP Physics 1, making space in the AP Physics 2 curriculum for more detail on waves and modern physics.

=== Standardizing the exams' format ===
As of the 2025 exam administrations, the College Board adopted a consistent exam format for all four AP Physics exams. The current (as of 2027) exams include: 85 minutes for 42 multiple-choice questions (40 of which are scored), followed by 95 minutes for 4 free-response questions (mathematical routines, translation between representations, experimental design and analysis, and qualitative/quantitative translation), totaling 180 minutes.

Previously, the AP Physics C exams were the shortest AP exams at just 90 minutes each and could be taken back-to-back on the same day, but with the revisions now doubling the duration of those exams, taking them in the same window of time is no longer possible.
