= AP French (disambiguation) =

AP French may refer to:

- AP French Language, commonly known as "AP French"

== See also ==
- AP French Literature
- Associated Press, for AP in France
- Agence France-Presse (AFP), the equivalent of Associated Press in France
