= AP English =

AP English can stand for two distinct Advanced Placement Programs for U.S. high school students, provided by the College Board:

- AP English Language and Composition
- AP English Literature and Composition

See also

- AP International English Language
