= Chinese Language and Culture =

Chinese Language and Culture may refer to:

- Chinese Language and Culture (HKALE), a subject in Hong Kong Advanced Level Examination, a core subject for all F.6 and 7 students in Hong Kong
- Advanced Placement Chinese Language and Culture, an Advanced Placement system subject with a totally different syllabus from the above one

== See also ==
- Chinese language
- Chinese culture
