= Lakeisha =

Lakeisha or LaKeisha is a given name. Notable people with the given name include:

- LaKeisha Lawson (born 1987), American sprinter
- Lakeisha Patterson (born 1999), Australian Paralympic swimmer
- La Keisha Jackson, American politician
- La'Keisha Sutton, American basketball player
- Lakeisha Clay, American murder victim

== See also ==
- Lakisha
