= Error Carried Forward =

School exam grading principle

Error Carried Forward (ECF) is an informal principle for school exam grading employed within computational fields of study such as mathematics, physics, engineering and computer science. In questions with multiple parts, it is common that the answer to the current part builds on an answer to the previous part. As such, if the answer to any part is incorrect, all subsequent parts will be incorrect, even if the approach for said subsequent parts was correct. The purpose of Error Carried Forward is to protect students who run into this issue from being penalized not only for the initial error, but for all subsequent errors that are only incorrect in answer, not approach.

== Usage ==
ECF has been a long standing topic within schools and standardized testing. Newcastle University's School of Mathematics, Statistics and Physics (NUMBAS) did not initially offer Error Carried Forwards points, but in 2015, NUMBAS developer Christian Lawson-Perfect proposed a system of adaptive marking enabled by the replacement of question variables with the student’s answers to question parts. Lawson-Perfect's approach is to represent each part of a question as a function of the answer to the previous part. That is, if a student answer's "x" for part a, the correct answer to part b is "f(x)." No matter what the student puts for part a, the corresponding answer for part b can be calculated quickly. Lawson-Perfect discloses that this system cannot identify "why" a student made an error, but maintains that it is generally successful in providing fair ECF credit.

The College Board has been known to employ ECF in both the AP Calculus AB and AP Physics B exams. However, the college board does not award ECF marks if an incorrect answer changes the latter parts of question too drastically. The Association of Chartered Certified Accountants (ACCA) has also been known to employ ECF on the financial accounting exam. However, this only applied to written, or fill-in-the-blank questions, not the multiple choice ones.

In 2022, Forrest et al conducted a study of a prototype computer application to incorporate ECF into automated grading of online assessments highlighting the prevalence of ECF today.
