= AP Japanese Language and Culture =

Advanced Placement school course

Advanced Placement (AP) Japanese Language and Culture (also known as AP Japanese) is a course offered by the College Board as part of the Advanced Placement Program in the United States. It is intended to give students a thorough background in the Japanese language and Japanese social customs. The class was first given as a certified College Board program in the 2006–07 school year. Preparations for the corresponding test were made, but the complex computer and internet requirements were not fully sorted out by administration time, and the exam was not given in some areas.

== Exam outline ==
Similar to the AP Chinese Language and Culture test, the exam is taken on a computer, requiring participants to read, write, and speak in Japanese, utilizing computers, headphones, and microphones. The 2012 exam was split mainly into two sections.

Section I

Students must answer multiple choice questions in response to audio prompts and short texts.

Section II

Students compose free-response answers in text-chat messages with 90 seconds to respond, and short responses with 20 minutes to respond. Audio conversations with 20-second responses, and a two-minute presentation complete the exam.

== Grade distribution ==
Score	2007	2008	2009	2010	2011	2012	2013	2014	2015	2016	2017	2018	2019	2020	2021	2022	2023	2024	2025	2026
5	45.8%	44.9%	48.8%	45.9%	43.9%	45.8%	44.5%	43.2%	48.5%	51.8%	45.1%	48.0%	45.3%	53.7%	47.5%	48.5%	50.8%	49.1%	43.3%	47%
4	9.9%	10.8%	10.3%	10.4%	11.3%	9.9%	10.6%	10.5%	9.2%	7.6%	11.0%	9.8%	12.4%	9.6%	9.2%	9.8%	8.6%	10.2%	11.3%	10%
3	21.1%	23.0%	19.8%	23.6%	21.2%	21.1%	21.4%	22.2%	19.7%	19.8%	20.8%	19.9%	21.6%	20.3%	17.6%	17.1%	17.5%	16.9%	20.2%	15%
2	8.5%	7.8%	6.5%	7.6%	7.5%	8.5%	7.4%	7.0%	8.1%	6.4%	8.2%	8.3%	7.7%	7.7%	7.9%	7.5%	8.2%	7.2%	7.5%	7%
1	14.7%	13.5%	14.7%	12.4%	16.1%	14.7%	16.1%	17.2%	14.5%	14.4%	14.8%	13.9%	13.0%	8.8%	17.7%	17.1%	14.9%	16.7%	17.8%	21%
% of scores 3 or higher	76.8%	78.7%	78.8%	80.0%	76.4%	76.8%	76.5%	75.9%	77.3%	79.1%	76.9%	77.8%	79.3%	83.6%	74.3%	75.5%	76.9%	76.1%	74.7%	72%
Mean	3.64	3.66	3.72	3.70	3.59	3.64	3.60	3.56	3.69	3.76	3.63	3.70	3.69	3.92	3.61	3.65	3.72	3.68	3.55	
Standard deviation	1.48	1.45	1.48	1.42	1.50	1.48	1.50	1.51	1.49	1.49	1.48	1.47	1.43	1.35	1.55	1.54	1.51	1.56		
Number of Students	1,667	1,538	2,085	2,051	2,226	2,177	2,234	2,311	2,431	2,481	2,429	2,459	2,479	2,581	2,204	2,765	3,089	3,125	3,245	3,400

== See also ==
- Japanese language education in the United States
