= Michele Cooke =

American geoscientist

Michele L. Cooke
- Education: Stanford University, Princeton University
- Scientific career
- Fields: Geomechanics
- Workplaces: University of Massachusetts Amherst

Michele Cooke is an American geoscientist and professor at the University of Massachusetts Amherst. Cooke is known for her research on earthquakes and her activism in support of other deaf and hard-of-hearing scientists.

== Early life ==
Cooke was born partially deaf and thus initially struggled in school, with her reading and speaking skills behind. After a kindergarten teacher noticed this issue and recommended testing, Cooke was eventually required to wear hearing aids and have speech therapy. Cooke attended public school until middle school, when her mother switched her to Stuart Country Day School, an all-girls Catholic school in Princeton, New Jersey, for a more intimate school experience; she graduated in 1985. Since graduate school, Cooke has used FM (frequency modulated) systems, oral interpreters, CART (Communication Access Realtime Translation), as well as ASL interpreters once her signing skills improved.

== Education ==
Cooke completed her Bachelor of Science in Engineering (BSE) in Geological Engineering in 1989 at Princeton University. She then went onto Stanford University to earn her Master of Science in Engineering (MSE) and obtain her degree in Civil Engineering in 1991.Through her studies at Stanford University, Cooke finished her Ph.D. in Earth and Environmental Sciences, which was dedicated to structural geology and geomechanics in 1996. She investigated fault mechanics alongside crustal deformation patterns as part of her doctoral research, and this work became essential for creating her contributions to earthquake science and geomechanical modeling.

== Career ==
=== Research ===
Cooke is a professor in the Department of Earth, Geographic, and Climate Sciences at the University of Massachusetts Amherst; she has worked at UMass since 1999. She researches earthquakes, fracture mechanics, and fault growth. Cooke is often quoted in (and occasionally writes) articles about earthquakes and faults.

Michele Cooke was featured in a live science article called The Faults That Ruptured in Twin California Quakes Are Very, Very Weird, Geologists Say. Her contribution included a discussion about the unusual earthquakes in Southern California in July 2019. Cooke's research centers on the mechanical behavior of fault systems, in Southern California. She makes use of numerical modeling to examine how fault geometry inspiring earthquake mechanics on slip distributions. Through studying the San Gorgonio Pass region introducing the non-planar faults that have a strain, therefore refining seismic hazard models. The particular models are often validated where in the scope of paleoseismic, geomorphic, and GPS data, assembling her work in interdisciplinary fields, geophysics and structured geology.

As a team with geologists, sedimentologists, and geomorphologists, Cooke's contributions gave new insight on how faults evolve through time and processes on earthquake frequency repetition. Her research objective is to improve seismic hazard assessments in tectonically active regions, for areas like fault interactions and strain accumulation, merging with her publications such as a published study in Tectonophysics investigating slip rate sites in the San Gorgonio Pass region.

Cooke published an article on Massive Science: Here’s how earthquakes rocked Puerto Rico into another emergency. Her analysis was of the earthquakes that struck Puerto Rico in January 2020.

A study cited by The Weather Channel used data from GPS stations placed throughout California's main fault lines to observe small or 'deep creep' ground movement, and Cooke and her team used that data to show how strain occurring in such fault lines moves away from growing tectonically active regions in the crust. This phenomenon involves the aseismic slip of fault segments that can pass shear stress to relieve tectonic stress without causing earthquakes that are noticeable. Such 'creeps' are important to detect and analyze as they may influence how and when seismic events happen. Cooke desires to improve the monitoring network and detection techniques, so that the behavior of faults may be better understood for the purposes of more accurate predictions of earthquake occurrences and hazard levels.

=== Grants ===
Cooke successfully obtained research grants through multiple organizations such as National Science Foundation (NSF), United States Geological Survey (USGS), and Southern California Earthquake Center (SCEC). Her research work concentrated on tectonic studies, fault mechanism analysis and seismic hazard predictions while she also applies her skills to geoscience education development. Cooke won an important NSF CAREER award in 2004 which supported her work until 2008 and she has maintained ongoing funding for investigations about fault system evolutions as well as stress transfer mechanisms and off-fault strains. Her international research obtained support from the DAAD program when she conducted research at GFZ Potsdam in Germany.

=== Teaching and advocacy ===
Michele Cooke is recognized for her advocacy in science, particularly for the deaf and hard-of-hearing in academics. Cooke's work includes public writing, curriculum development, and mentoring that aims to foster inclusivity in geoscience education. Her works are widely published in outlets such as Nature Geoscience, Eos, and Inside Higher Ed. This led to initiatives like the National Science Foundation that support Cooke's research on improving access to geoscience for people with disabilities.

From the University of Massachusetts Amherst, she established graduate curricula that promote equity in classroom environments. This experience granted Cooke multiple scholarships that support internal workshops within allyship and accessible pedagogy. Furthermore, Cooke has led multiple leadership positions in graduate education at the University of Massachusetts Amherst. She was passionate and served as the Graduate Program Director of Admissions since 2017 to 2021. Cooke has worked to implement more inclusive and equitable admissions practices which included advocating for the removal of GRE requirements that had biases affecting students with learning difficulties.

Cooke is partially deaf and advocates for better accessibility for other deaf scientists. In geoscience education, she believes that all academic support should be a more inclusive environment, particularly in STEM. She prefers ‘partially deaf’ over ‘deaf’ or ‘hard of hearing’. This is due to her working with those in the hearing world, teaching hearing students, working with hearing colleagues, as well as having a hearing family. After receiving from UMass College of Natural Science Outstanding Researcher award, Laura Fattaruso filmed Michele's acceptance speech on deaf gain, which describes the benefits or values of being deaf or hard-of-hearing. Michele also published her acceptance speech, so it is accessible for people who are deaf or hard-of-hearing. Cooke also co-directs a blog by and for deaf and hard-of-hearing academics, The Mind Hears. Her dedication has helped inform new policies around peer mentorships in both institutional and academic networks.

As a leader in shaping discourse around disability in academics. Cooke has played a leading role in STEM fields. In her publications such as "After GRExit: Reducing Bias in Geoscience Graduate Admissions" (Eos, 2022) and "Writing Reference Letters for People with Disabilities" (Inside Higher Ed, 2022), as well with contributions to the Nature Geoscience article "Beyond Recruitment: First-Year Graduate Courses Foster Inclusion". Cooke co-authors in scientific articles that capture the scientific rigor from presentations of the deaf scientists in the field.

=== Professional affiliations ===
Cooke has been involved in various scientific organizations, such as the American Geophysical Union and the Geological Society of America where she has been a part of the tectonophysics and structural geology division since the 1990s. Since 2020, Cooke has been a part of the American Association for the Advancement of Science as well as the Statewide California Earthquake Center and the Seismological Society of America.

== Publications ==
Cooke has been consulted numerous times on matters of seismography and geophysics. She has also consulted on pieces about being deaf in academia. In addition to her consultations, she has published talk and advice pieces. Cooke is a prolific researcher who has added to the knowledge base of geosciences, seismography, fault mechanics, deep creep, tectonic movement, and more.

- Research on scale models of single oblique-slip fault deformations.
- Exploration of Deep Creep on the Northern San Jacinto Fault.
- The benefits of physical models in tectonic research, in the classroom and in the lab.
- Work minimization as applied to tectonics.
- Evolving fault efficiency.
- Wet kaolin as a model material in tectonic research. Kaolin is a specific type of clay, and when wet it acts in a similar way to the Earth's crust.
- Exploring basement topography on Utopia Planitia, Mars.
- Mechanical efficiency in evolution of the San Andreas Fault.
- 3D modeling of the fault in Los Angeles metro area.
- Groundwater flow in relation to fracture networks.
- Energy budget of active fault systems to create a system to examine complex faults.
- 2D mechanical fault analysis of the Los Angeles Basin.
- Exploration of bedding contacts with fracture intersections.
- Numerical modeling and results in East Kaibab Monocline, Utah.
- Spatial distribution of splay fractures and mechanical processing.
- Fault related folding in bedding plane slippage.
- Using Plexiglas rectangles to map fracture patterns.

== Honors and awards ==
- Appointed to the Board of Earth Science Resources of the National Academy of Sciences, Engineering and Medicine
- Outstanding Research Award, College of Natural Science, UMass Amherst
- 2020 Inclusive Geoscience Education and Research (IGER) Award, International Association for Geoscience Diversity
- Associate Editor Journal of Geophysical Research – Solid Earth
- Appointed to Southern California Earthquake Center Planning Committee
- Elected to the Board of the Southern California Earthquake Center
- Fellow of the Geological Society of America
- UMass Amherst Distinguished Academic Outreach Teaching Award
- NSF CAREER grant
- National Association of Geosciences Teachers Distinguished Speaker
- Lieberman Fellow, Scholarship and University Service (Stanford)
- Stanford University Centennial Teaching Award
- Corning Fellowship, for research in materials science (Stanford)
- W. Taylor Thom Jr., Prize, Excellence in Geological Engineering (Princeton)
- Fellow of the (AGU) American Geophysical Union, a distinction award.
