= AP Psychology =

Advanced Placement course and exam

Logo of AP Psychology as of 2025

Advanced Placement (AP) Psychology (also known as AP Psych) and its corresponding exam are part of the College Board's Advanced Placement Program. This course is tailored for students interested in the field of psychology and as an opportunity to earn Advanced Placement credit or exemption from a college-level psychology course.

AP Psychology is often considered one of the easier AP exams; relative to the other tests, the material is rather straightforward and much easier to self-study. Among all the social studies Advanced Placement exams, the Psych exam had the second-highest passing rate in 2018.

== Topics covered ==
The College Board provides a course of study to help educators prepare their students for the AP Psychology exam. The exam covers the following 5 areas. The percentage indicates the portion of the multiple-choice section of the exam focused on each content area:

Topic	Percent
Biological Bases of Behavior	15-25%
Cognition	15-25%
Development and Learning	15-25%
Social Psychology and Personality	15-25%
Mental and Physical Health	15-25%

== Exam ==
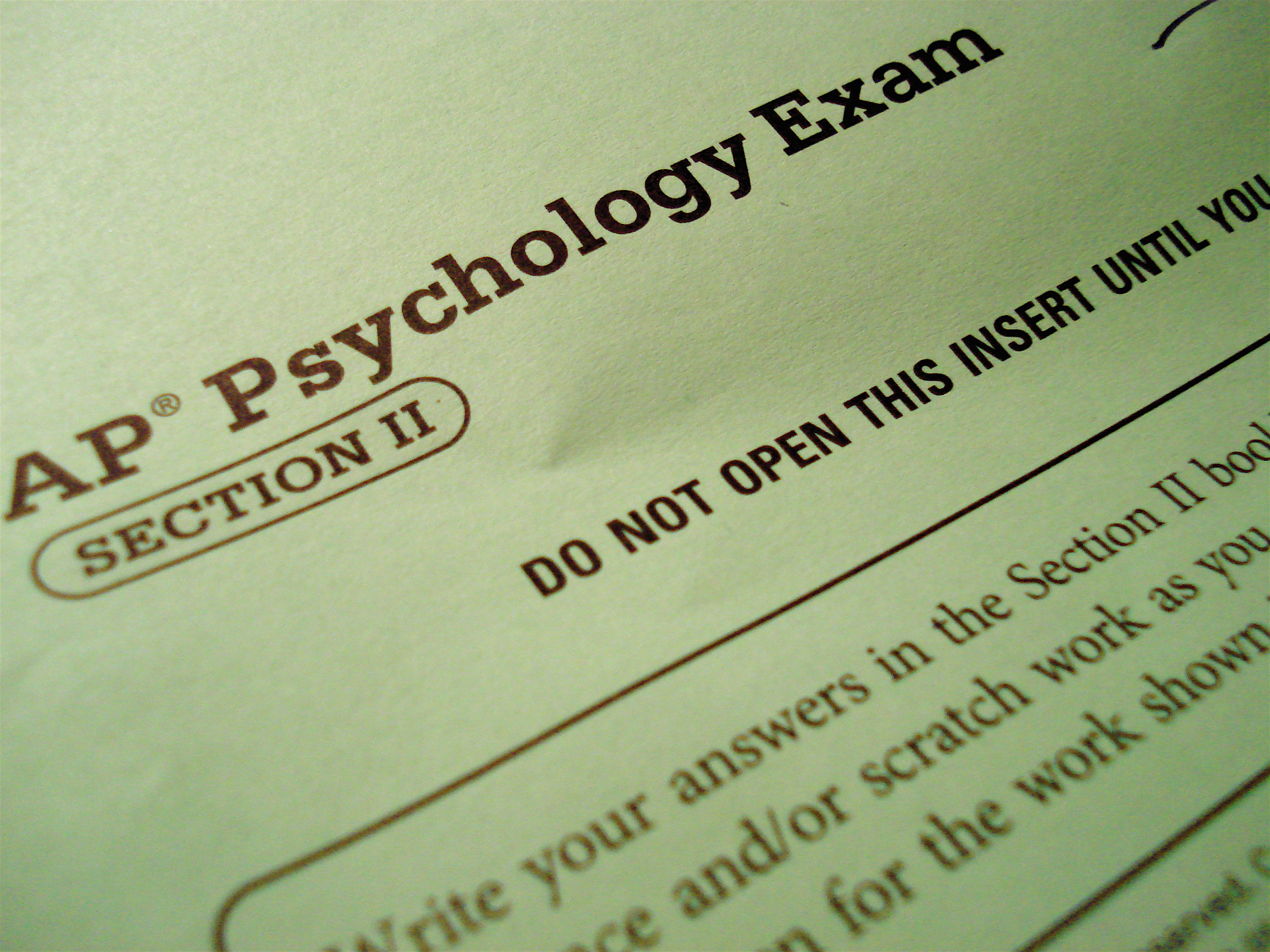
Free response section booklet

The exam includes two sections: a 90-minute multiple choice section (75 questions) and a 70-minute free response section (2 prompts). The multiple choice provides two-thirds of the grade and the free-response provides the remaining third. Additionally, the free response questions consist of one AAQ (Article Analysis Question) and one EBQ (Evidence Based Question).

Beginning with the May 2011 AP Exam administration, total scores on the multiple-choice section are based only on the number of questions answered correctly. Points are no longer deducted for incorrect answers. Grading (the number of points needed to get a certain score) is slightly more strict as a result.

In 2025, the AP Psychology exam went digital.

== Grade distribution ==
The exam was first held in 1992. Grade distributions for the Psychology exam scores since 2015 were:

Score	2015	2016	2017	2018	2019	2020	2021	2022	2023	2024	2025	2026
5	20.2%	19.1%	19.1%	21.1%	20.2%	22.4%	14.1%	17.0%	16.9%	19.2%	14.4%	15%
4	26.2%	26.1%	25.1%	26.3%	25.4%	25.4 %	21.2%	22.2%	23.2%	23.1%	30.9%	35%
3	19.8%	19.1%	20.0%	18.3%	18.8%	23.5 %	18.0%	19.1%	19.5%	19.5%	25.2%	24%
2	13.1%	14.2%	14.6%	14.5%	13.7%	9.6 %	15.2%	13.1%	12.4%	11.8%	19.7%	18%
1	20.7%	21.6%	21.2%	19.8%	22.0%	19.1 %	31.5%	28.5%	28.0%	26.5%	9.8%	8%
% of Scores 3 or higher	66.2%	64.2%	64.2%	65.7%	64.4%	71.3%	53.3%	58.3%	59.6%	61.7%	70.5%	74%
Mean	3.12	3.07	3.06	3.14	3.08	3.22	2.71	2.86	2.89	2.97	3.20	
Standard Deviation	1.42	1.42	1.42	1.42	1.44	1.40	1.45	1.47	1.46	1.47	1.20	
Number of Students	276,971	293,350	302,369	311,759	311,215	295,621	288,511	292,501	321,329	320,164	334,038	379,000

== Controversies ==
In August 2023, the Florida Department of Education ruled that AP Psychology was in violation of the Florida Parental Rights in Education Act due to content on sexual orientation and gender identity in the course, effectively banning such content of the course the state of Florida. The department told school officials that the course may only be taught if material on sexual orientation and gender identity was removed from the curriculum. College Board responded that if such topics were removed, the class would not be compliant with college requirements, and thus not be eligible for Advanced Placement. The ban came amidst a broader backlash against the teaching of LGBTQ+ topics in the United States.

On May 16, 2025, during the final session of the 2025 AP exam administration, some students were unable to log into the College Board’s Bluebook testing application. The issue led to the extension of the exam start time to 2 p.m. local time for schools with flexible schedules. Affected students were offered make-up testing, available at no cost.
