= AP Russian Language and Culture =

Proposed Advanced Placement course

Advanced Placement (AP) Russian Language and Culture was a proposed Advanced Placement course and examination, with development originally beginning in 2005. Development began with the American Council of Teachers of Russian, in collaboration with the College Board and with funding from the U.S. Department of Education and the National Security Education Program. The program was meant to launch between 2007 and 2008.

AP Russian Language would have been equivalent to a second-year college-level Russian language course. Students enrolling in AP Russian Language and Culture would typically be in their fourth or fifth year of language study or have had equivalent experience with the language. The proposed exam would have been reported with a score of 1 to 5. A prototype exam was administered to students in 2010. An unofficial exam was created and distributed by the American Council for International Education, and was split into four segments: reading and listening comprehension, integrated written communication, and oral proficiency overview. 190–200 minutes were allotted, with native speakers having ten fewer minutes than learned speakers.

After 2010, the College Board removed all materials for this course and removed it from their website.

== Current standing ==
Little is known about the discontinuation of AP Russian Language and Culture, as the College Board has shared no details about the scrapping of the course, or its plans for it in the future.

As of 2023, the College Board and the American Council of Teachers of Russian both recommend students who are interested in college-level credit for the Russian language take the National Examinations in World Languages (NEWL) exam, administered by the American Councils for International Education.
