= AP German Language and Culture =

Advanced Placement course and exam

Logo of AP German Language and Culture as of 2025

Advanced Placement (AP) German Language and Culture (also known as AP German Language or AP German) is a course and examination provided by the College Board through the Advanced Placement Program. This course is designed to give high school students the opportunity to receive credit in a college-level German language course. It is generally taken in the fourth year of high school German study.

== Exam ==
The AP German Language and Culture exam administered around the end of the academic year is split into two parts, a multiple-choice section and a free response section, each with equal value in the overall exam score.

=== Format ===
Section	Number of Questions	Number of Minutes	%
Section I, Part A: Multiple Choice - Interpretive Communication: Print Texts	30 questions	40 minutes	50%
Section I, Part B: Multiple Choice - Interpretive Communication: Print and Audio Texts	35 questions	~55 minutes	50%
Section II Part A: Free Response - Writing	2 questions	~70 minutes	50%
Section II, Part B: Free Response - Speaking	6 questions	~18 minutes	50%

=== Grade distribution ===
The grade distributions for the AP German Language and Culture exam since 2009 are:

Score	2009	2010	2011	2012	2013	2014	2015	2016	2017	2018	2019	2020	2021	2022	2023	2024	2025	2026
5	23.3%	24.8%	23.4%	26.2%	25.9%	23.1%	24.7%	21.4%	23.0%	22.4%	21.0%	23.9%	18.0%	20.0%	21.8%	24%	19%	24%
4	21.7%	20.0%	19.6%	25.6%	23.4%	23.1%	24.0%	22.5%	24.1%	22.7%	24.2%	33.9%	19.5%	19.1%	21.3%	18%	23%	17%
3	24.0%	23.1%	23.6%	27.5%	28.4%	27.1%	28.2%	27.0%	28.5%	25.9%	27.2%	16.0%	27.6%	26.5%	24.9%	25%	27%	27%
2	18.9%	18.6%	19.8%	13.9%	16.3%	18.5%	16.6%	20.6%	17.5%	21.6%	19.5%	19.5%	23.5%	22.9%	19.2%	22%	19%	22%
1	12.2%	13.4%	13.6%	6.8%	6.0%	8.2%	6.4%	8.5%	6.9%	7.4%	8.2%	6.7%	11.4%	11.6%	12.8%	11%	12%	10%
% of Scores 3 or Higher	68.9%	67.9%	66.6%	79.3%	77.7%	73.3%	77.0%	70.9%	75.5%	71.0%	72.3%	73.8%	65.1%	65.5%	68.0%	67%	69%	68%
Mean	3.25	3.24	3.19	3.50	3.47	3.34	3.44	3.28	3.39	3.31	3.30	3.49	3.09	3.13	3.20	3.22		
Standard Deviation	1.33	1.36	1.36	1.21	1.21	1.24	1.21	1.25	1.21	1.24	1.23	1.23	1.26	1.29	1.32	1.32		
Number of Students	5,001	5,389	5,232	4,754	4,966	5,111	5,103	4,945	5,089	5,053	5,160	4,928	4,315	4,450	4,375	4,185	4,213	4,200

== AP German Literature ==
The College Board originally offered two AP German exams: AP German Language and AP German Literature. However, in 1983, due to the persistently low number of AP German Literature exam students, the College Board dropped the Literature exam. Since then, they have offered only the AP German Language exam.
