= AP International English Language =

English language course for non-native speakers

Advanced Placement (AP) International English Language (also known as APIEL) was an AP Examinations course managed by Educational Testing Service (ETS) with the sponsorship of the College Board in New York. It was designed for non-native speakers to prepare for studying in an English-speaking university, particularly in North America. The course also gives students a chance to earn college credit. The three-hour exam assesses four language skills: listening, reading, writing, and speaking. The test paper has two sections: multiple-choice questions and free-response questions. APIEL committee consists of high school and university English teachers from Belgium, China, France, Germany, Switzerland, and the United States.

== History ==
Since 1955, the Advanced Placement (AP) program of the College Board has offered college-level curriculum and examinations to high school students. The APIEL examination was conceived in 1995 and was first implemented in 1997. It was first tested in Germany in 1997, and there were about 2500 examinees at that time. The examination was also tested in France in the second year, and further extended to Australia, Belgium, Sweden, Norway and India in 1999 and 2000. The test was offered in China in 2002 for the first time. For a designated high school course, the course must be reviewed by the University Board to determine that it was compliant with the AP course. If the course was approved, the school can use the AP designation and the course will be publicly listed on the AP course ledger.

In the summer of 2002, the College Board in New York, as the organization that created it, decided to discontinue the APIEL exam. The validity of the acquired APIEL certificates in the scope valid at that time was guaranteed until at least the end of 2005.

== Preparation ==
The APIEL was open to any student who was in the final stage of secondary school or attending a university. The subject matter of the APIEL examination was chosen from a wide range of subjects, including current events, history, the arts, literature, science and technology, and other topics of general interest. The content of the APIEL was not tied to a particular curriculum, so there are no additional coursework or materials required for preparation, other than general secondary school study. The College Board website provides test details and sample questions for the examination.

== Abilities tested ==
The APIEL measures the English fluency of non-native speakers. The test was designed to indicate that high-scoring students will be able to participate in the English-speaking academic community on an equal basis with native English speakers.

APIEL students should demonstrate the following skills:

- Comprehension of spoken English, particularly in academic contexts;
- A critical understanding of written English, including excerpts from books and articles on academic subjects;
- The ability to express ideas and opinions in writing with clarity and fluency; and
- The ability to express ideas and opinions orally with accuracy and resourcefulness.

== The examination ==
Like the other AP language exams, the three-hour APIEL exam assesses four language skills: listening, reading, writing and speaking. Each section was worth 25% of the total examination grade. Listening consists of dialogues and short talks; reading was drawn from prose texts of varying degrees of complexity and a wide range of subjects; writing consists of two essays; and speaking requires students' verbal response to five tasks.

=== Section I. Multiple-choice questions ===
The multiple-choice section has two parts—listening and reading. Both are machine-scored.

==== Listening ====
The listening part of the exam has around 40 multiple-choice questions, and students have around 35 minutes to answer them.

The test usually consists of short monologues, presentations, or dialogues between two speakers who discuss a variety of subjects. For the test, native speakers of standard North American English are recorded on cassette tapes. The recordings test "comprehension of spoken English". Students listen once to each recording and answer all the questions based on the recording; each question was spoken twice. Note-taking in the examination booklet was allowed. The test booklet only has the answer choices and the questions are not printed in the test booklet.

==== Reading ====
The reading part of the exam has around 40 multiple-choice questions, and students have around 50 minutes to answer them.

This part of the exam consists of several prose passages, each followed by multiple-choice questions about their content and meaning. The readings vary in length, subject, and complexity, and they are primarily chosen from twentieth-century materials.

=== Section II. Free-response questions ===
The free-response section has two parts—writing and speaking. Both of these sections are scored by the International Schools team and university English teachers at the Central Rating Center each June.

==== Writing ====
The writing element consists of two essays. Students are required to write both in 80 minutes (the suggested time for each was 40 minutes).

Students are often asked to present their ideas about major issues, and they should be able to understand and explain their opinions by providing evidence from their own experiences.

==== Speaking ====
The speaking part of the exam has five tasks that need to be completed in approximately 15 minutes. The tasks have visual elements or demonstrate substantive issues. For example, in one exam, a set of pictures was given to students that showed the stages of development for towns in three countries. Students had to describe how the town changed and what type of daily life they might expect in each stage of the development. During the exam, students are given thirty seconds to prepare their speech, and then they have one minute to adequately respond to each task. Students record their responses on individual cassette tapes, and each response was scored holistically.

== Scoring ==
The APIEL, like other AP exams, was scored on a 1 to 5 scale as follows:

- 5 – Extremely well qualified
- 4 – Well qualified
- 3 – Qualified
- 2 – Possibly qualified
- 1 – No recommendation

Grades of 3 or higher are considered "qualifying" for the purpose of college credit.

Score Distribution:

Score	1999	2000	2001	2002	2003	2004	2005	2006	2007	2008	2009	2010
5	16.8%	18.3%	17%	15.7%	15.4%	14.4%	15.1%	13.8%	13.6%	13%	12.6%	12.2%
4	17%	17.6%	18.4%	18.6%	18.9%	17%	16.9%	17.7%	17.5%	17.1%	16.8%	16.5%
3	21%	21%	19.9%	22%	21.6%	22%	20.2%	21.9%	22.9%	20.5%	21%	20.4%
2	23%	20.8%	21.4%	21.9%	22.4%	23.1%	24.4%	25.1%	24.7%	25.7%	24.8%	25.7%
1	22.2%	22.3%	23.3%	21.8%	21.7%	23.5%	23.4%	21.5%	21.3%	23.7%	24.8%	25.2%
Passing Rate	54.8%	56.9%	55.3%	56.3%	55.9%	53.4%	52.2%	53.4%	54%	50.6%	50.4%	49.1%

== Cost and dates ==
The fee of US$78 (or equivalent in local currency) covers all four test components. Students may apply for financial aid.

Test dates are scheduled in an effort to avoid conflicts with national vacations and local examinations, and are set differently in different regions. For example, tests are held in March in European countries, and May in India. The examination was currently only available outside the United States.

== Test security and fairness ==
So that all students have equal chance to succeed on AP exams, the College Board makes efforts to achieve security and fairness in the test. The topics for APIEL are chosen generally and broadly in order to avoid test bias caused by topic familiarity. AP courses can build critical thinking and problem-solving skills. All participating schools and students have to agree to meet all safety requirements in the AP Coordinator's Manual and the Bulletin for AP Students and Parents. The multiple-choice section (Section I) in the examination paper was kept secure both before and after the exam administration. It was treated as misconduct if AP teachers "interview" students after the exam to gather information on specific questions. No one taking the exam can ever have access to or see the questions contained in that section, except the candidates. The test must also never be shared or copied in any manner. Students are not allowed to bring any electronics into the exam room or break area, including phones, smartwatches, wearable technology of any kind, laptops, tablet computers, Bluetooth devices, portable listening or recording devices—MP3 player, iPod, etc.—cameras, other photographic equipment, devices that can access the internet, timers of any type, or any other electronic or communication devices. Also, no one was allowed to take photos in the exam room or to share on any form of social media during the exam.

The exam publisher strictly follows rules to achieve fairness. Psychometric analyses, like DIF studies, are included to determine testing bias, and exams will not be scored unless their fairness has been approved by experts. The College Board also provides information about the publisher to maintain the quality of the test and for research reports about test-users.

== Benefit ==
As APIEL was an Advanced Placement course, the examination structure was similar to other AP exams. AP exams were established in 1957; they have a long tradition and are widely accepted. A study has shown that AP students score higher on standardized test scores than non-AP students. The APIEL exam was developed and evaluated by international professors and faculty organizations, rather than only by Americans. It provides a chance for high school students to take college-level courses without paying college tuition. By taking the AP exams, students can earn university credit and advanced placement in college coursework. Some schools award credit for ESL courses based on APIEL grades. It can also be helpful for college applications. The APIEL can be paid in local currency and was less expensive than TOEFL and IELTS. Students can also apply for financial support if they have difficulty paying for the exam.

== See also ==
- College Board
- Advanced Placement
- Advanced Placement exams
