= AP Chinese Language and Culture =

Advanced Placement course and exam

Logo of AP Chinese Language and Culture as of 2026

Advanced Placement (AP) Chinese Language and Culture (commonly known as AP Chinese) is a course and exam offered by the College Board as a part of the Advanced Placement Program in the United States. It requires proficiencies throughout the Intermediate range as described in the American Council on the Teaching of Foreign Languages (ACTFL) Proficiency Guidelines. The course interweaves language and culture learning and is conducted mostly in Mandarin Chinese. The first AP Chinese courses were offered worldwide in the fall of 2006, followed by the exam in May 2007.

== Topic outline ==
The course consists of six units, covering key topics relevant to both the coursework and the exam.

Units
Families and Communities
Language and Culture
Art and Creativity
Science and Technology
Contemporary Life
Global Contexts

== Exam ==
The AP Chinese Language and Culture Exam is approximately 1 hour and 50 minutes in length. It assesses Interpersonal, Interpretive, and Presentational communication skills in Mandarin Chinese, along with knowledge of Chinese culture.

Section I consists of free-response questions.

- Question 1: Project Presentation
- Question 2: Project Q&A
- Question 3: Story Narration
- Question 4: Email Response

Section II, consists of multiple-choice questions.

- Part A: Listening
- Part B: Reading

=== Grade distribution ===
The AP Chinese Language and Culture exam consistently has the highest percentage of 5 scores out of all AP tests, likely attributed to fluent Chinese speakers taking the exam for credit. The exception is in 2022, when the AP Japanese Language and Culture exam narrowly had a higher 5-rate by 0.5 percentage points. The 5-rate for the Chinese exam, on average, steadily declined as the years passed. The grade distributions since the exam's debut in 2007 were:

| Score | 2007 | 2008 | 2009 | 2010 | 2011 | 2012 | 2013 | 2014 | 2015 | 2016 | 2017 | 2018 | 2019 | 2020 | 2021 | 2022 | 2023 | 2024 | 2025 | 2026 |
|---|---|---|---|---|---|---|---|---|---|---|---|---|---|---|---|---|---|---|---|---|
| 5 | 81.0% | 85.5% | 81.5% | 76.7% | 72.3% | 71.1% | 69.7% | 68.5% | 65.3% | 62.8% | 68.4% | 66.1% | 60.1% | 55.4% | 57.2% | 49.3% | 54.2% | 53.3% | 54.8% | 48.0% |
| 4 | 11.8% | 8.1% | 9.8% | 13.2% | 13.9% | 13.2% | 14.6% | 14.4% | 16.0% | 16.4% | 11.3% | 12.2% | 14.9% | 15.5% | 15.5% | 19.6% | 18.8% | 19.4% | 18.2% | 19.0% |
| 3 | 4.5% | 4.7% | 6.0% | 6.6% | 9.2% | 10.9% | 10.7% | 11.6% | 11.8% | 14.4% | 12.5% | 13.0% | 14.8% | 17.9% | 15.5% | 18.0% | 15.4% | 15.9% | 16.1% | 18.0% |
| 2 | 1.1% | 0.8% | 1.0% | 1.5% | 2.1% | 2.3% | 2.3% | 2.8% | 3.1% | 2.7% | 3.3% | 3.7% | 4.0% | 5.1% | 4.6% | 5.3% | 5.0% | 4.9% | 4.6% | 60.% |
| 1 | 1.5% | 1.0% | 1.7% | 2.0% | 2.5% | 2.5% | 2.8% | 2.7% | 3.9% | 3.7% | 4.5% | 5.0% | 6.2% | 6.1% | 7.1% | 7.8% | 6.6% | 6.5% | 6.2% | 9.0% |
| % of Scores 3 or Higher | 97.3% | 98.3% | 97.4% | 96.5% | 95.4% | 95.2% | 95.0% | 94.5% | 93.0% | 93.7% | 92.2% | 91.3% | 89.8% | 88.7% | 88.2% | 86.9% | 88.4% | 88.5% | 89.2% | 85.0% |
| Mean | 4.70 | 4.76 | 4.69 | 4.61 | 4.51 | 4.48 | 4.46 | 4.43 | 4.36 | 4.32 | 4.36 | 4.31 | 4.19 | 4.09 | 4.11 | 3.97 | 4.09 | 4.08 | 4.11 | |
| Standard Deviation | 0.74 | 0.67 | 0.77 | 0.84 | 0.93 | 0.95 | 0.97 | 0.98 | 1.06 | 1.05 | 1.10 | 1.14 | 1.20 | 1.22 | 1.24 | 1.26 | 1.22 | 1.21 | 1.20 | |
| Number of Students | 3,261 | 4,311 | 5,100 | 6,388 | 7,970 | 9,357 | 10,121 | 10,728 | 11,633 | 12,524 | 13,091 | 13,825 | 13,853 | 14,663 | 13,122 | 15,277 | 16,495 | 17,905 | 16,518 | 21,000 |

== See also ==
- Chinese as a foreign language
- Language education in the United States
