= AP Physics B =

Advanced Placement course and exam

Advanced Placement (AP) Physics B was a physics course administered by the College Board as part of its Advanced Placement program. It was equivalent to a year-long introductory university course covering Newtonian mechanics, electromagnetism, fluid mechanics, thermal physics, waves, optics, and modern physics. The course was algebra-based and heavily computational; in 2015, it was replaced by the more concept-focused AP Physics 1 and AP Physics 2.

== Exam ==
The exam consisted of a 70 multiple-choice question (MCQ) section, followed by a 6–7 free-response question (FRQ) section. Each section was 90 minutes and was worth 50% of the final score. The MCQ section banned calculators, while the FRQ allowed calculators and a list of common formulas. Overall, the exam was configured to approximately cover a set percentage of each of the five target categories:

Topic	Percent
Newtonian Mechanics	35%
Fluid Mechanics and Thermal Physics	15%
Electricity and Magnetism	25%
Waves and Optics	15%
Atomic and Nuclear Physics	10%

== Purpose ==
According to the College Board web site, the Physics B course provided "a foundation in physics for students in the life sciences, a pre medical career path, and some applied sciences, as well as other fields not directly related to science."

== Discontinuation ==
Starting in the 2014–2015 school year, AP Physics B was no longer offered, and AP Physics 1 and AP Physics 2 took its place. Like AP Physics B, both are algebra-based, and both are designed to be taught as year-long courses.

== Grade distribution ==
The grade distributions for the Physics B scores from 2010 until its discontinuation in 2014 are as follows:

Score	2010	2011	2012	2013	2014
5	14.8%	16.4%	16.3%	16.6%	15.8%
4	18.5%	19.2%	19.3%	19.9%	18.5%
3	26.1%	25.9%	26.4%	26.1%	26.5%
2	18.6%	17.3%	16.8%	16.3%	17%
1	21.9%	21.3%	21.3%	21.1%	22.3%
% of Scores 3 or Higher	59.4%	61.5%	62.0%	62.6%	60.8%
Mean	2.85	2.92	2.93	2.95	2.89
Standard Deviation	1.35	1.37	1.36	1.37	1.37
Number of Students	67,312	75,648	80,584	89,263	93,574
