= La'Keisha Sutton =

American basketball player (born 1990)

No. 11 – Harlem Globetrotters
- Position: Point guard
- League: Harlem Globetrotters (entertainment basketball)

Personal information
- Born: November 18, 1990 (age 35) Trenton, New Jersey, U.S.
- Listed height: 5 ft 9 in (1.75 m)
- Listed weight: 150 lb (68 kg)

Career information
- High school: Trenton Catholic Academy (Hamilton, New Jersey)
- College: South Carolina (2008–2012)
- Playing career: 2012–present
- Number: 11, 23, 17

Career history
- 2013—2013: Williams Jones Cup (Taiwan)
- 2013—2015: Turi Riento (Finland)
- 2014—2014: UTE (Ecuador)
- 2014—2015: Saarlouis Royals (Germany)
- 2016—2016: Beroe Stara Zagora (Bulgaria)
- 2018—present: Harlem Globetrotters

La'Keisha Sutton (born November 18, 1990) is an American professional basketball player, coach, author, and entrepreneur known for her role as one of the few women to play for the Harlem Globetrotters. She played four seasons of college basketball for the University of South Carolina under coach Dawn Staley before playing professional basketball overseas and joining the Harlem Globetrotters.

== Early life and education ==
Sutton was born and raised in Trenton, New Jersey. She grew up in Roger Gardens and Prospect Village, near where she played basketball as a kid at the West Ward Recreation Center. During middle school, she earned a scholarship to attend Stuart Country Day School in Princeton, NJ. She went on to attend the University of South Carolina from 2008 to 2012, where she majored in Broadcast Communications and later applied those skills to her brand and storytelling work.

== High school career ==
At Trenton Catholic Academy, Sutton was coached by Khaliq Lewis El. In her senior year, she was awarded as New Jersey Gatorade Player of the Year, Trenton Times Player of the Year, and Trentonian Player of the Year, while averaging 19.6 points per game. She was a four-time all-county first-team selection and twice earned All-State honors from the Associated Press. She was named MVP of the 2008 New Jersey State Championship game after leading her team to its second-consecutive title. Over her career, she scored 1,990 points.

== College career ==
At South Carolina, she was a consistent contributor across her four seasons. She was a unanimous selection to the SEC All-Freshman Team during her freshmen season. Sutton was also Dawn Staley's first South Carolina Gamecock recruit in 2008 where she helped lead South Carolina to their first ever Sweet Sixteen appearance in 2012. In her senior year (2011–12), she was named second-team All-SEC, and made the SEC All-Defensive team. She earned honorable mention All-SEC from the Associated Press. During that season, she led the team in assists and had multiple 20+ point games. Over her tenure, she became the 11th player in program history to record at least 300 assists and 1,000 points. She scored nearly 1,300 points over her four-year career and graduated in 2012 with a degree in Broadcast Communications. She earned the nickname Fan Favorite in college. Upon leaving college she became a WNBA prospect.

SOUTH CAROLINA STATISTICS
Season	G	FGM	FGA	FTM	FTA	3PM	3PA	REB	AST	STL	BL	PTS	AVG
2008-09	28	108	263	77	114	15	36	56	68	36	5	308	11.0
2009-10	29	109	273	49	86	15	37	68	74	25	4	282	9.7
2010-11	33	128	314	68	112	13	55	88	118	47	4	337	10.2
2011-12	32	122	327	68	89	24	88	91	84	40	9	336	10.5
TOTALS	122	467	1177	262	401	67	216	303	344	148	22	1263	10.4

== Professional basketball career ==
After college, Sutton played professional overseas in Taiwan, Finland, Ecuador, Germany, and Bulgaria before joining the Harlem Globetrotters in 2018, and adopting the nickname "Swish". With the Globetrotters, she traveled extensively (to all 50 U.S. states and various countries) and was one of a small number of women to perform in the show.

“I come from the projects,” she said. “I used this basketball to take me all over the world.” -La'Keisha Sutton “It was an honor to be a part of the Globetrotters,” Sutton says. “Even though there will be many more women to wear that jersey, I’ll always be proud to be the first one from New Jersey.” - La'Keisha Sutton

== Coaching, mentorship, and youth development ==
Sutton has taken on leadership roles off the court as well. She has been Camp Director and coach through Nike Basketball Camps. She is Head Coach of the varsity girls' basketball team at the George School in Newtown, Pennsylvania., where in her second coaching season she was praised for her credentials and connection to the local youth basketball scene.

"It’s a great feeling because when I look at some of these kids, they remind me of myself,” she said. “When I think of how much patience coach Khaliq Lewis-El and coach Mel Weldon and people that came into my life to have had to even work with me and my teammates, everything I learned, everything I’m still learning, I want to share with them at an early age. And then you add the things I learned here from coach Staley and I’m teaching all of that to the 10- and 11-year-olds. Even if they don’t understand it now, they’ll be thinking about it.

She was the Director of Recreation Basketball Programming for the City of Trenton.

== Media career ==
In addition to her athletic work, Sutton has made appearances in White Men Can't Jump. She has also been an emcee for the Hoopbus WNBA draft alongside, Sheryl Swoopes, and Tamika Catchings. Furthermore, she was also invited to coach at the Nike Academy in 2025.

Sutton is the author of From The Projects To Fan Favorite: Made In Trenton.

== Community outreach and philanthropy ==
Beyond playing, Sutton founded the Fan Favorite Club, a basketball training and community development brand, as CEO. She has also worked as a coach and mentor, including a role as Varsity Girls Head Basketball Coach at George School. Sutton authored a book titled From the Projects to Fan Favorite, aimed at youth empowerment.

She is deeply tied to her hometown of Trenton, where she has been active in community outreach - hosting youth basketball tournaments, donating basketballs to the West Ward Center, and promoting positive development through sport.

== Personal life ==
Sutton maintains a presence of social media under the handle @fanfavorite11.

== Honors and legacy ==
- New Jersey Gatorade Player of the Year (2008)
- SEC All-Freshman Team (2009)
- Second-team All-SEC and SEC All-Defensive Team (2012)
- One of a small number of women to play for the Harlem Globetrotters.
- First woman Globetrotter from New Jersey.
- In Trenton, celebrated as a local role model and community leader.
- Inducted into the Mercer County Basketball Hall of Fame and CYO Hall of Fame.
