= 2020 AP exams controversy =

Education scandal

The 2020 Advanced Placement examination controversy involved College Board, a nonprofit education company, allegedly performing a series of potentially illegal activities, including phishing students and creating unfair testing conditions. Estimates indicated that 4,914,000 AP tests were taken online due to the COVID-19 pandemic, with some experiencing technical difficulties while submitting their examinations. In response, a lawsuit was filed against the College Board alleging breach of contract, gross negligence, misrepresentation, unjust enrichment and violations of the Americans with Disabilities Act. The lawsuit was subsequently administratively closed pending the outcome of arbitration between the College Board and the plaintiffs.

== Controversies ==
=== Previous controversies ===
The College Board has received criticism for its high exam fees, the sale of student data in 2019, the recycling of past SAT Exams, reporting errors, and alleged monopolistic business practices. The company has also been accused of violating their non-profit status because of its high executive compensation.

=== COVID-19 pandemic and controversy ===
In response to the COVID-19 pandemic, the College Board announced the cancellation of several SAT exams scheduled for Spring 2020 as well as the creation of an online at-home AP exam. Online AP examinations were open-note and lasted only 45 minutes. Many students reported issues with the online exams and more than 10,000 students had to retake the exams as a result. The College Board was also criticized for administering the exams during times inconvenient for students outside of the contiguous United States with exams in some countries like Japan and South Korea being scheduled at 3:00 a.m. In response, the College Board has offered free CLEP testing to students overseas who were unsatisfied with their scores.

=== Lawsuit ===
On May 16, 2020, a class-action lawsuit joined by FairTest was filed against the College Board based on alleged breaches of contract, gross negligence, misrepresentation, unjust enrichment, and violations of the Americans with Disabilities Act. An earlier lawsuit alleged that the company used "unfair and deceptive means" to sell student data. On October 30, 2020, a judge granted a motion by the College Board to send most of the lawsuit's claims to arbitration, because nearly all the students represented in the suit had taken the AP tests, which included signing an agreement to resolve claims by arbitration.
