= AP Latin =

College Board test

Advanced Placement (AP) Latin, formerly Advanced Placement (AP) Latin: Vergil, is an examination in Latin literature offered to American high school students by the College Board's Advanced Placement Program. Prior to the 2012–2013 academic year, the course focused on poetry selections from the Aeneid, written by Augustan author Publius Vergilius Maro, also known as Vergil or Virgil. However, in the 2012–2013 year, the College Board changed the content of the course to include not only poetry, but also prose. The modified course consists of both selections from Vergil and selections from Commentaries on the Gallic War, written by prose author Gaius Julius Caesar. Also included in the new curriculum is an increased focus on sight reading. The student taking the exam will not necessarily have been exposed to the specific reading passage that appears on this portion of the exam. The College Board suggests that a curriculum include practice with sight reading. The exam is administered in May and is three hours long, consisting of a one-hour multiple-choice section and a two-hour free-response section.

== Material previously tested (before 2012) ==
Students were expected to be familiar with these following lines of the Aeneid:

- Book 1: Lines 1–519
- Book 2: Lines 1–56, 199–297, 469–566, 735-804
- Book 4: Lines 1–449, 642–705
- Book 6: Lines 1–211, 450–476, 847–901
- Book 10: Lines 420-509
- Book 12: Lines 791–842, 887-952

Students were also expected to be familiar with the total content of Books 1 through 12.

== Abilities tested ==
The exam tests students' abilities to:

- Translate a Latin passage from the syllabus into English literally
- Explicate specific words and phrases in context
- Identify the context and significance of short excerpts from the works specified in the syllabus
- Identify and analyze characteristic or noteworthy features of the authors' modes of expression, including their use of imagery, figures of speech, sound effects, and metrical effects (in poetry only), as seen in specific passages
- Discuss particular motifs or general themes not only suggested by passages but also relevant to other selections
- Analyze and discuss structure and to demonstrate an awareness of the features used in the construction of a poem, thesis, or an argument
- Scan the meters specified in the syllabus

== Reading and translation ==
Critical appreciation of the Aeneid as poetry implies the ability to translate literally, to analyze, to interpret, to read aloud with attention to pauses and phrasing, and to scan the dactylic hexameter verse. Students should be given extensive practice in reading at sight and in translating literally so that their translations not only are accurate and precise, but also make sense in English.

The instructions for the translation questions, "translate as literally as possible," call for a translation that is accurate and precise. In some cases an idiom may be translated in a way that makes sense in English but is rather loose compared to the Latin. In general, however, students are reminded that:

- The tense, voice, number, and mood of verbs need to be translated literally
- Subject–verb agreement must be correct
- Participles should be rendered precisely with regard to tense and voice
- Ablative absolutes may be rendered literally or as subordinate clauses; however, the tense and number of the participle must be rendered accurately
- Historical present is acceptable as long as it is used consistently throughout the passage.

== Exam ==
The three-hour exam consists of a one-hour multiple-choice section and a two-hour free-response section that includes fifteen minutes of reading time and one hour forty-five minutes of writing time. The multiple choice section includes approximately fifty questions that relate to four passages: three read at sight and one from the syllabus. The multiple choice questions test the many skills learned and practiced throughout the year, including:

- 20–30% grammar and lexical questions (10–15 questions)
- 35–45% translation or interpretation of a phrase or sentence (17–23 questions)
- 2–5% metrics: that is, scansion of the dactylic hexameter line (1–3 questions)
- 2–5% figures of speech (1–3 questions)
- 20–30% identification of allusions or references, recognition of words understood but unexpressed, explication of inferences to be drawn (10–15 questions)
- 2–5% background questions on the Aeneid passage only (1–3 questions)

The free-response section includes translation, analysis, and interpretation of the Latin text from the syllabus. The format is as follows:

- Question 1: a 10-minute translation
- Question 2: a 10-minute translation
- Question 3: a 45-minute long essay
- Question 4: a 20-minute short essay
- Question 5: a 20-minute short essay based on the entire Aeneid (Latin selections and parts read in English)

== Old AP Latin curriculum (2012–2025) ==
For the 2012–2013 academic year, the College Board announced that it had made revisions to its AP Latin curriculum. In general, the College Board announced new goals in the curriculum. These include:

- Required readings in both prose and poetry
- Development of student capacity to read Latin at sight
- Greater focus on grammatical, syntactical, and literary terminology

Instead of solely focusing on Vergil's Aeneid, the curriculum will now include both prose and poetry, including selections from Julius Caesar's Commentaries on the Gallic War. The old required reading list, including revisions to the number of lines required from the Aeneid, is:

Vergil's Aeneid

- Book 1: Lines 1–209, 418–440, 494–578
- Book 2: Lines 40–56, 201–249, 268–297, 559–620
- Book 4: Lines 160–218, 259–361, 659–705
- Book 6: Lines 295–332, 384–425, 450–476, 847–899

Caesar's Gallic War

- Book 1: Chapters 1–7
- Book 4: Chapters 24–35 and the first sentence of Chapter 36 (Eodem die legati [...] venerunt.)
- Book 5: Chapters 24–48
- Book 6: Chapters 13–20

Also, there is a change to the required readings in English. The new list from the Aeneid is books 1, 2, 4, 6, 8, and 12, instead of all twelve books, as was previously required. The new required reading list in English from the Gallic War is books 1, 6, and 7. Also in the revised curriculum there is also a newly placed emphasis on sight reading. The College Board announced that the exam will include Latin passages not on the required readings lists in an effort to enhance students' ability to read at sight. Recommended authors for prose include (inexhaustibly): Nepos, Cicero (though not his letters), Livy, Pliny the Younger, and Seneca the Younger, rather than authors such as Tacitus or Sallust. For poetry, recommended authors (inexhaustibly) include: Ovid, Martial, Tibullus, and Catullus, rather than poets such as Horace, Juvenal, or Lucan. For practice with sight reading in both poetry and prose, the College Board recommends additional Latin passages in the Aeneid and Gallic War that are not included in the required reading list.

The free-response section includes translation, analysis, and interpretation of the Latin text from the syllabus. The format is as follows:

- Question 1: 15-minute translation: Vergil
- Question 2: 15-minute translation: Caesar
- Question 3: 45-minute analytical essay
- Question 4: 15-minute short answers: Vergil
- Question 5: 15-minute short answers: Caesar

== Current AP Latin curriculum (2026-Present) ==
For the 2025-2026 academic year, College Board announced an overhaul to the AP Latin curriculum, completely eliminating the texts involving Julius Caesar, replacing them with selections from Pliny the Younger. A completely new addition to the curriculum was the implementation of Project Passages.

The new required reading list is:

Pliny the Younger, Letters

- Book 6: 4, 7, 16, 20
- Book 7: 27
- Book 10: 5, 6, 7, 37, 90

Vergil's Aeneid

- Book 1: Lines 1-33, 88-107, 496-508
- Book 2: Lines 40-56, 201-249
- Book 4: Lines 74-89, 165-197, 305-361
- Book 6: Lines 450-476, 788-800, 847-853
- Book 7: Lines 45-58, 783-792, 803-817
- Book 11: Lines 532-594
- Book 12: Lines 791-796, 803-812, 818-828, 919-952

There are also texts not on the required reading list, which are meant to enhance the ability of the student to be able to read at sight.

The formatting of the AP test consists of the following:

- 52 MCQs, 65 minutes (1 hour, 5 minutes), worth 50% of the exam grade
- 5 FRQs, 115 minutes (1 hour, 55 minutes), worth 50% of the exam grade
  - Question 1: Short answer (6-8 subquestions)
  - Question 2: Literal Translation (15 segments)
  - Question 3: Short Essay (2 subquestions)
  - Question 4: Project Prose Passage Short Essay (2 subquestions)
  - Question 5: Project Poetry Passage Short Essay (2 subquestions)
- In-class checkpoints on the course project, worth 2% of the exam grade

== Grade distribution ==
In the 2010 administration, 6,523 students took the exam, and 4,114 passed (3 or higher), or about 63.1%. In the 2011 administration, 6,044 students took the exam, and 3,861 passed (3 or higher), or about 63.9%. In the 2012 administration, 18,161 students took the exam, and 11,244 passed (3 or higher), or about 61.9%.

In the 2013 administration of the redesigned exam, 6,667 students took the exam, and 4,442 passed (3 or higher), or about 66.6%. In the 2014 administration of the exam, 6,542 students took the exam, a slight decrease from last year, and 4,307 passed (3 or higher), or about 65.8%, a slight decrease from last year's pass rate.

The score distributions are:

	Score percentages								
Year	5	4	3	2	1	% of scores 3 or higher	Test Takers	Mean	Standard Deviation
2025	12.5%	16.7%	29.4%	25.2%	16.2%	58.6%	4,336	2.84	1.24
2024	11.9%	16.6%	28.0%	23.0%	20.5%	56.5%	4,264	2.77	1.28
2023	12.3%	16.5%	28.0%	24.9%	18.4%	56.7%	4,533	2.79	1.26
2022	11.2%	16.1%	29.8%	24.8%	18.2%	57.1%	4,832	2.77	1.24
2021	10.0%	16.9%	29.9%	25.3%	17.9%	56.8%	4,889	2.76	1.22
2020	16.5%	20.4%	32.2%	17.9%	12.9%	69.2%	5,850	3.10	1.25
2019	13.0%	19.3%	30.5%	24.1%	13.0%	62.9%	6,083	2.95	1.21
2018	14.4%	20.1%	31.9%	22.8%	10.7%	66.4%	6,409	3.05	1.20
2017	12.5%	19.4%	31.5%	23.0%	13.6%	63.4%	6,647	2.94	1.21
2016	12.7%	20.8%	32.1%	22.9%	11.5%	65.6%	6,584	3.00	1.19
2015	12.6%	21.6%	29.4%	24.4%	12.0%	63.6%	6,571	2.98	1.20
2014	13.2%	22.4%	30.2%	24.0%	10.1%	65.8%	6,542	3.05	1.18
2013	14.1%	20.9%	31.6%	22.9%	10.5%	66.6%	6,667	3.05	1.19
2012	21.3%	17.0%	24.6%	18.5%	18.6%	62.9%	6,424	3.04	1.40
2011	20.2%	18.1%	25.6%	18.3%	17.9%	63.9%	6,044	3.05	1.37
2010	21.4%	17.6%	24.1%	17.8%	19.1%	63.1%	6,523	3.04	1.40
2009	19.6%	18.7%	25.5%	18.3%	17.9%	63.7%	4,295	3.04	1.37
2008	17.3%	17.6%	26.8%	16.2%	22.2%	61.7%	4,847	2.92	1.38
2007	19.0%	18.5%	24.9%	18.9%	18.7%	62.4%	4,929	3.00	1.37
2006	17.9%	17.5%	27.6%	16.6%	20.4%	63.0%	4,844	2.96	1.37
2005	18.7%	17.2%	28.6%	16.3%	19.1%	64.6%	4,362	3.00	1.36
2004	17.8%	17.0%	27.3%	20.0%	18.0%	62.1%	4,061	2.97	1.34
2003	19.1%	19.4%	28.8%	14.6%	18.0%	67.4%	3,942	3.07	1.35
2002	16.2%	19.9%	25.4%	19.8%	18.7%	61.6%	3,740	2.95	1.34

There is a notable change in the pattern of scorings from 2012 to 2013.
