= AP French Literature =

Advanced Placement course and exam

Advanced Placement (AP) French Literature (also called AP French Literature or AP French Lit) was an Advanced Placement course and examination offered by the College Board. The course was designed to replicate a college French literature course for high school students. Students studied a variety of novels, plays, and poetry, all written in French.

Due to the low numbers of students taking AP French Literature, it was discontinued after the 2008–2009 year.

== Required reading ==
The works required by the College Board for the 2008 exam were:

- Moderato Cantabile by Marguerite Duras
- Le Cid by Pierre Corneille
- Candide by Voltaire
- Une Tempête (A Tempest) by Aimé Césaire
- Pierre et Jean (Pierre and Jean) by Guy de Maupassant
- L'École des femmes (The School for Wives) by Molière
- Poems by Charles Baudelaire, Jean de la Fontaine, Joachim du Bellay, Guillaume Apollinaire, and Louise Labé.

== Grade distributions ==
In 2007, 2,068 students took the exam from 478 schools. The mean score was 3.30 with a standard deviation of 1.34.

The grade distribution for 2007 was:

Score	Percent
5	24.2%
4	23.5%
3	23.2%
2	16.3%
1	12.7%
