= AP Physics C: Electricity and Magnetism =

Advanced Placement course

Advanced Placement (AP) Physics C: Electricity and Magnetism (also known as AP Physics C: E&M or AP E&M) is an introductory physics course administered by the College Board as part of its Advanced Placement program. It is intended to serve as a proxy for a second-semester calculus-based university course in electricity and magnetism. Physics C: E&M may be combined with its mechanics counterpart to form a year-long course that prepares for both exams.

== History ==
Before 1973, the topics of AP Physics C: Electricity and Magnetism were covered in a singular AP Physics C exam, which included mechanics, electricity, magnetism, optics, fluids, and modern physics. In 1973, this exam was discontinued, and two new exams were created, which covered Newtonian mechanics and electromagnetism respectively.

Before 2006, test-takers paid only once and were given the choice of taking either one or two parts of the Physics C test. This was changed, so now test-takers have to pay twice to take both parts of the AP Physics C test.

Before the 2024–25 school year, the multiple choice and free response section were each allotted 45 minutes, with 35 questions for the former and 3 questions for the latter. This made AP Physics C: Electricity and Magnetism, along with Mechanics, the shortest exams offered by the College Board. Unlike other exams, the AP Physics C exams also had 5 options that test-takers could choose from rather than the typical 4. This was changed in an announcement made by College Board in the February 2024 regarding changes to their AP Physics courses for the 2024–25 school year onward, which explained that the multiple choice sections would have 40 questions and the free response sections would have 4 questions. To compensate, College Board allotted 80 minutes for the multiple choice section and 100 minutes for the free response section, making the exams as long as the ones for AP Physics 1 and AP Physics 2.

== Curriculum ==
E&M is equivalent to an introductory college course in electricity and magnetism for physics or engineering majors. The course modules are:

Topic	Exam Weighting
Electric Charges, Fields, and Gauss's Law	15–25%
Electric Potential	10–20%
Conductors and Capacitors	10–15%
Electric Circuits	15–25%
Magnetic Fields and Electromagnetism	10–20%
Electromagnetic Induction	10–20%

The content of Physics C: E&M overlaps with that of AP Physics 2, but Physics 2 is algebra-based and covers additional topics outside of electromagnetism, while Physics C is calculus-based and only covers electromagnetism. Methods of calculus are used wherever appropriate in formulating physical principles and in applying them to physical problems. Therefore, students should have completed or be concurrently enrolled in a calculus class.

Starting in the 2024–25 school year, all units in AP Physics C: Electricity and Magnetism are numbered sequentially after the 7 units in AP Physics C: Mechanics. This starts with Electric Charges, Fields, and Gauss's Law as unit 8 and ends with Electromagnetic Induction as unit 13.

== Exam ==
Section	Questions	Time	Exam Weighting
Section I: Multiple Choice	40 MCQ	1 hour 20 minutes	50%
Section II: Free Response	4 FRQ	1 hour 40 minutes	50%

The course culminates in an optional exam for which high-performing students may receive some credit towards their college coursework, depending on the institution.

=== Science Practices Assessed ===
Multiple Choice and Free Response Sections of the AP Physics C: Electricity and Magnetism exam are also assessed on scientific practices. Below are tables representing the practices assessed and their weighting for both parts of the exam

Section 1: Multiple Choice
Science Practice	Exam Weighting
2. Mathematical Routines	65–85%
3. Experimental Design and Analysis	20–35%

Section 2: Free Response
Science Practice	Exam Weighting
1. Creating Representations	20–35%
2. Mathematical Routines	40–45%
3. Scientific Questioning and Argumentation	30–35%

=== Grade distribution ===
The grade distributions for the Physics C: Electricity and Magnetism scores since 2015 were:

Score	2015	2016	2017	2018	2019	2020	2021	2022	2023	2024
5	31.4%	34.6%	31.9%	37.4%	34.6%	40.4%	32.6%	31.5%	33.6%	27%
4	24.5%	22.7%	25.2%	22.5%	22.6%	22.4%	23.1%	23.6%	23.5%	23%
3	12.5%	13.2%	14.3%	13.5%	13.9%	11.6%	13.8%	14.3%	13.1%	17%
2	19.7%	17.9%	16.9%	16.3%	17.8%	16.2%	18.0%	18.1%	17.9%	20%
1	11.9%	11.6%	11.7%	10.3%	11.1%	9.5%	12.5%	12.5%	11.9%	13%
% of Scores 3 or Higher	68.4%	70.5%	71.4%	73.4%	71.1%	74.4%	69.5%	69.4%	70.2%	67%
Mean	3.44	3.51	3.49	3.60	3.52	3.68	3.45	3.44	3.49	3.31
Standard Deviation	1.41	1.41	1.39	1.39	1.40	1.38	1.42	1.41	1.41	1.39
Number of Students	22,789	23,347	24,249	25,074	25,342	23,655	20,471	19,978	24,179	-

== See also ==
- Physics
- Glossary of physics
