= Advanced Placement =

American program with college-level classes offered to high school students

- Logo since 2017
- Acronym: AP
- Administrator: College Board
- Year started: 1952
- Duration: Mostly 2–3 hours
- Score range: 1–5 (details)
- Score validity: Scores archived after 4 years, but remain valid
- Offered: Yearly
- Regions: United States and Canada
- Fee: 2024 exams (USD): $98 (US, Canada, DoDEA schools); $128 (elsewhere); $146 (AP Capstone)
- Website: ap.collegeboard.org

Advanced Placement (AP) is a program in the United States and Canada created by the College Board. AP offers undergraduate university-level curricula and examinations to high school students. Colleges and universities in the US and elsewhere may grant placement and course credit to students who obtain qualifying scores on the examinations.

The AP curriculum for each of the various subjects is created for the College Board by a panel of experts and college-level educators in that academic discipline. For a high school course to have the designation as offering an AP course, the course must be audited by the College Board to ascertain that it satisfies the AP curriculum as specified in the Board's Course and Examination Description (CED). If the course is approved, the school may use the AP designation and the course will be publicly listed on the AP Course Ledger.

== Exam information ==
AP tests are scored on a 1 to 5 scale as follows:

- 5 – Extremely well qualified
- 4 – Well qualified
- 3 – Qualified
- 2 – Possibly qualified
- 1 – No recommendation

The multiple-choice (MCQ) component of the exam is scored by computer, and since 2011, points are no longer deducted for incorrect answers. The free-response (FRQ) component is scored by trained readers at the AP Reading each June. The scores on various components are weighted and combined into a raw composite score. The Chief Reader for each exam then decides on the grade cutoffs for that year's exam, which determine how the composite scores are converted into the final grades. During the process, a number of reviews and statistical analyses are performed to ensure that the grading is reliable. The overall goal is for the grades to reflect an absolute scale of performance which can be compared from year to year.

Some colleges use AP test scores to exempt students from introductory coursework, others use them to place students in higher designated courses, and some do both. Each college's policy is different, but most require a minimum score of 3 or 4 to receive college credit. Typically, this appears as a "CR" grade on the college transcript, although some colleges and universities will award an A grade for a 5 score. Some countries, such as Germany, will directly admit students who have completed a specific set of AP tests, depending on the subject they wish to study there. In addition, completing AP courses helps students qualify for various types of scholarships; according to the College Board, 31% of colleges and universities look at AP experience when making scholarship decisions.

AP exams begin on the second Monday in May and end on the following week's Friday for regular testing. Late testing occurs on the following week after regular testing ending for students that missed, had a scheduling conflict, or had/experienced a testing disturbance during the regular exams.

The College Board has offered an Internet-based score reporting service since 2013. Students can use their 2013 AP Number or Student Number (if one was indicated) along with a College Board Account to access current and previous years' exam scores. This system can also be used to send scores to colleges and universities for which a four-digit institutional code is assigned.

== History ==
=== 20th century ===
After the end of World War II, the Ford Foundation created a fund that supported committees studying education. The program, which was then referred to as the "Kenyon Plan", was founded and pioneered at Kenyon College in Gambier, Ohio, by the then-college president Gordon Chalmers. The first study was conducted by four prep schools, Lawrenceville School, Phillips Academy, Phillips Exeter Academy, and St. Paul's School, and three universities, Harvard University, Princeton University, and Yale University.

In 1952, they issued the report General Education in School and College: A Committee Report which recommended allowing high school seniors to study college-level material and to take achievement exams that allowed them to attain college credit for this work. The second committee, the Committee on Admission with Advanced Standing, developed and implemented the plan to choose a curriculum. A pilot program was run in 1952 which covered eleven disciplines. In the 1955–56 school year, it was nationally implemented in ten subjects: Mathematics, Physics, Chemistry, Biology, English, History, French, German, Spanish, and Latin.

The College Board, a not-for-profit organization based in New York City, has run the AP program since 1955. It develops and maintains guidelines for the teaching of higher-level courses in various subject areas. In addition, it supports teachers of AP courses and supports universities. These activities are funded through fees required to take the AP exams.

=== Early 21st century ===
The number of AP exams administered each year saw a steady increase in the 21st century. In 2003, 175,860 English Language and Composition exams were administered. By 2013, this number had risen to 476,277, or an increase of 171%. Such an increase has occurred in nearly all AP exams offered, with the AP Psychology exam seeing a 281% increase over the past decade. In 2022, the most taken AP exam was English Language and Composition with 520,771 students and the least taken AP exam was Italian Language and Culture with 2,194 students.

In 2006, over one million students took over two million Advanced Placement examinations. Many high schools in the United States offer AP courses, though the College Board allows any student to take any examination regardless of participation in its respective course. Therefore, home-schooled students and students from schools that do not offer AP courses have an equal opportunity to take AP exams.

In 2007, hedge fund manager and philanthropist Whitney Tilson helped create a $1 million program (called Reach, for Rewarding Achievement) funded by philanthropists to pay students in 25 public schools and six Roman Catholic private schools in New York City who do well on Advanced Placement exams. High school students receiving a top score of five on one of the exams earned $1,000 (a four was worth $750, and a three was worth $500). The schools chosen for the program all had a high proportion of low-income black or Latino students. Tilson approached the Pershing Square Foundation to finance the project, and it agreed to give the project $1 million for its first year.

On April 3, 2008, the College Board announced that four AP courses—French Literature, Latin Literature, Computer Science AB, and Italian Language and Culture—would be discontinued after the 2008–2009 school year due to lack of funding. However, the Italian Language and Culture test was again offered beginning in 2011.

=== Recent developments ===
Between 2016 and 2019, the College Board focused on restructuring exam formats to emphasize critical analysis and scenario-based questions. Many exams, such as AP World History and AP U.S. Government and Politics, saw reductions in the number of multiple-choice questions—frequently changing from five answer choices down to four—alongside adjusted time limits and new essay formats. AP Biology saw a significant removal of introductory course material in botany, basic zoology, and comparative anatomy and physiology.

The 2020 exam year faced unprecedented disruptions due to the COVID-19 pandemic, and exams this year were taken online at home, shorted to 45 minutes, tested only the first 75% of course material, and permitted students to freely consult their notes and books. A class action lawsuit was brought against College Board following various legal, technical, and accessibility issues with this exam. Following this year, standard testing resumed, but the College Board continued to refine exam structures across numerous subjects, including AP Human Geography, AP Computer Science, and AP Latin. These updates largely continued the trend of standardizing multiple-choice sections to four options and adjusting the time allotted for free-response questions. This period also saw the introduction of the new courses AP Precalculus and AP African American Studies, which held their first testing terms in May 2024 in May 2025, respectively.

As of the 2024 testing season, exams cost $98 each, though the cost may be subsidized by local or state programs. Financial aid is available for students who qualify for it; the exam reduction is $36 per exam from College Board plus an additional $9 rebate per fee-reduced exam from the school. There may be further reductions depending on the state.

In May 2025, twenty-eight AP exams moved to a fully digital format, primarily in the humanities and computer science, while math and science exams adopted a hybrid model where students view prompts digitally but write their free-response answers on paper. Concurrently, several major courses underwent deep structural revisions: the four AP Physics courses all adopted a new shared format, AP Psychology was reorganized into five large units, and AP Statistics removed several topics alongside the second-year algebra prerequisite.

== Courses ==
=== Current subjects ===
There are currently 42 courses and exams available through the AP Program.

Arts

- AP Art and Design (2D, 3D, and Drawing)
- AP Art History
- AP Music Theory

English and Capstone

- AP English Language and Composition
- AP English Literature and Composition
- AP Seminar
- AP Research

History and Social Sciences

- AP African American Studies
- AP Comparative Government and Politics
- AP European History
- AP Human Geography
- AP Macroeconomics
- AP Microeconomics
- AP Psychology
- AP United States Government and Politics
- AP United States History
- AP World History: Modern

Math and Computer Sciences

- AP Computer Science Principles
- AP Computer Science A
- AP Calculus AB and BC
- AP Precalculus
- AP Statistics

Life and Physical Sciences

- AP Biology
- AP Chemistry
- AP Environmental Science
- AP Physics (1, 2, and C)

World Languages and Cultures

- AP Chinese Language and Culture
- AP French Language and Culture
- AP German Language and Culture
- AP Italian Language and Culture
- AP Japanese Language and Culture
- AP Latin
- AP Spanish Language and Culture
- AP Spanish Literature and Culture

AP Career Kickstart

- AP Cybersecurity
- AP Business with Personal Finance

=== Courses in development ===
In 2024, the College Board announced pilot programs for a group of new AP exams.

- AP Networking
- AP Anatomy and Physiology
- AP Korean Language and Culture
- AP Culinary
- AP Astronomy
- AP Law Studies
- AP Creative Writing
- AP Beef and Arguing
- AP Engineering
- AP Philosophy
- AP Personal Finance

In the announcement, the College Board additionally noted that "We plan to build out multiple career and technical education (CTE) pathways in information technology (networking, cybersecurity, coding) and additional pathways in business and health sciences."

In 2018, when the AP World History exam was discontinued, the College Board announced their commitment to developing two replacement courses, AP World History: Ancient and AP World History: Modern, but so far only the Modern course has launched, with the Ancient course still in development.

=== Discontinued courses ===
Over the decades that the AP program has run, several AP courses and exams have been discontinued or replaced, including

- German Literature (discontinued 1983)
- Music Listening and Literature (discontinued 1991)
- International English Language (discontinued 2002)
- Computer Science AB (discontinued 2009)
- French Literature (discontinued 2009)
- Latin Literature (discontinued 2009)
- Russian Language and Culture (discontinued 2010)
- Latin: Vergil (discontinued 2012)
- Physics B (discontinued 2014)

== Exam subsidies ==
For student of financial needs, College Board offers a fee reduction of $37 per AP exam and schools are expected to forgo a $9 rebate for the student. This results in a cost of $53 for US students and $83 for international students.

However, recognizing that the cost could be an impediment to students of limited means, a number of states and municipalities independent of the College Board have partially or fully subsidized the cost. The state of Florida reimburses school districts for the exam costs of students enrolled in Advanced Placement courses. The Los Angeles Unified School District, the Montebello Unified School District in California, the Hawaii Department of Education, New York City Department of Education, and the state of Indiana subsidize Examination fees in subjects of math, science, and English, and the Edmonds School District in suburban Seattle currently subsidizes Advanced Placement fees of students who enroll in the free school lunch program. Some school districts, such as Fairfax County Public Schools, will fully cover the cost of a limited number of exams, after which point the student must pay. In addition, some school districts offer free tests to all students enrolled in any Advanced Placement class.

== Exam performance ==
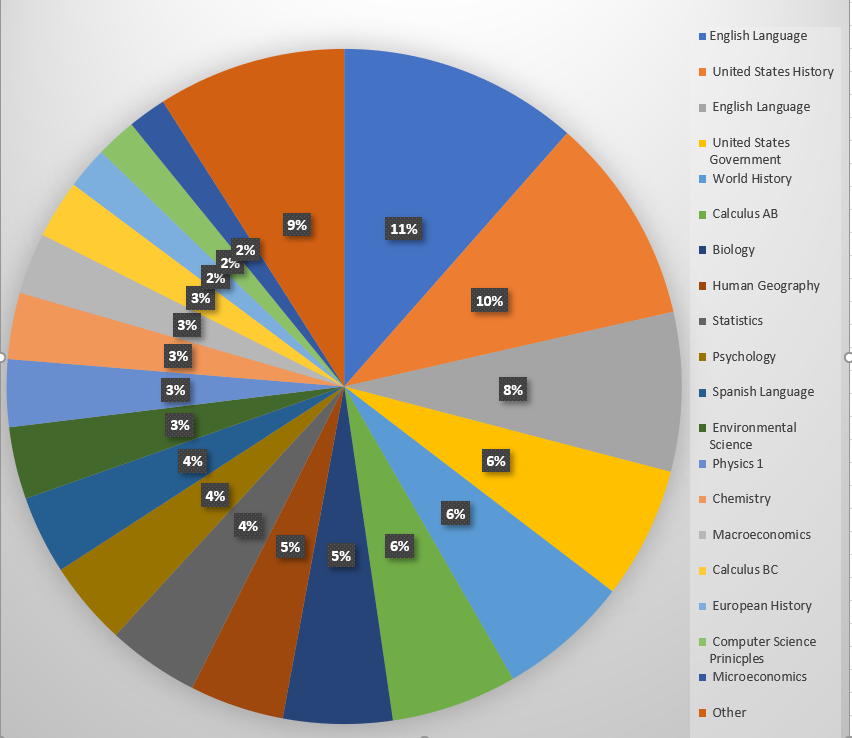
AP Exam Taken by Subject 2019

Below are statistics from the 2023 exam cycle showing the number of participants, the percentage who obtained a score of 3 or higher, and the mean score. Students generally need a score of 3 or higher to receive credit or benefit.

2023 scoring results
Exam name	Number of students	Scored ≥3 (%)	Mean score
2-D Art and Design	43,854	83.6	3.36
3-D Art and Design	7,505	72.1	3.07
Art History	24,624	64.6	3.04
Biology	239,470	64.4	3.04
Calculus AB	273,987	58.0	2.99
Calculus BC	135,458	78.5	3.75
Chemistry	139,448	75.1	3.26
Chinese Language and Culture	16,495	88.4	4.09
Comparative Government and Politics	23,611	70.8	3.14
Computer Science A	94,438	68.0	3.21
Computer Science Principles	164,505	78.5	3.75
Drawing	22,555	84.8	3.47
English Language and Composition	562,328	56.1	2.82
English Literature and Composition	356,043	77.2	3.26
Environmental Science	209,757	53.7	2.79
European History	81,788	59.4	2.95
French Language and Culture	18,655	74.7	3.21
German Language and Culture	4,375	68	3.20
Human Geography	247,043	54.4	2.75
Italian Language and Culture	2,034	72.9	3.32
Japanese Language and Culture	3,089	76.9	3.72
Latin	4,533	56.7	2.79
Macroeconomics	148,836	64.7	3.08
Microeconomics	94,772	68.0	3.25
Music Theory	17,834	60.7	3.02
Physics 1: Algebra-Based	159,582	45.6	2.55
Physics 2: Algebra-Based	20,453	69.8	3.15
Physics C: Electricity and Magnetism	24,179	70.2	3.49
Physics C: Mechanics	55,602	73.5	3.40
Psychology	321,329	59.6	2.89
Research	28,402	84.4	3.34
Seminar	73,334	85.0	3.24
Spanish Language and Culture	164,434	83.8	3.60
Spanish Literature and Culture	22,860	67.4	2.98
Statistics	242,929	60.0	2.89
United States History	467,975	47.5	2.54
United States Government and Politics	329,132	49.2	2.59
World History	350,353	64.7	3.04
Total	5,197,601	*	*

The College Board estimates that about two-thirds of students enrolled in an AP course take the course's AP test. On the other hand, a study of University of California system students found that only about 55% to 60% of AP students took their course's exam.

One 2014 study of math and science AP courses showed that participation rates were 52.7% for AP Chemistry, 53.6% for AP Physics, 57.7% for AP Biology, and 77.4% for AP Calculus. A 2017 study found similar participation rates (49.5% for AP Chemistry, 52.3% for AP Physics, 54.5% for Biology, and 68.9% for Calculus). History exams were found to have slightly higher participation rates (57.9% for AP European History, 58.5% for AP World History, and 62.8% for AP U.S. History), and 65.4% of AP English students took either the AP English Language or AP English Literature exam. This study found that for "core AP subjects (i.e., no arts or language subjects)", the overall test participation rate was 60.8%.

In February 2014 College Board released data from the previous ten years of AP exams. College Board found that 33.2% of public high school graduates from the class of 2013 had taken an AP exam, compared to 18.9% in 2003. In 2013 20.1% of graduates who had taken an AP test achieved a 3 or higher compared to 12.2% in 2003.

== Criticism ==
Lichten appears to have been the first to question whether AP can maintain high academic standards while experiencing explosive growth. Other researchers have addressed similar questions. Whether the AP program can serve large numbers of students well is a matter of some concern within the education field. A 2024 report stated that students who receive scores of 3 and higher are being given college credit at fewer top colleges and universities. Also in 2024, Hess noted that an increasing proportion of students who take and pass AP courses are not ready for college-level work.

A 2010 study of the impact of the Advanced Placement program on students' academic achievement found that students who took AP courses in the sciences but failed the AP exam performed no better in college science courses than students without any AP course at all. Referring to students who complete the course but fail the exam, the head researcher, Phillip M. Sadler, stated in an interview that "research shows that they don't appear to have learned anything during the year, so there is probably a better course for them." Two subsequent studies compared non-AP students with AP students who had not taken their course's AP exam, had taken the AP exam but did not pass it, or had passed the AP exam. Like Sadler's study, both found that AP students who passed their exam scored highest in other measures of academic achievement. The largest study of this sort, with a sample size of over 90,000, replicated these results and also showed that non-AP students performed with equal levels of academic achievement as AP students who did not take their course's AP exam—even after controlling for over 70 intervening variables. This led the authors to state that AP participation "is not beneficial to students who merely enroll in the courses" without taking the exam.

== See also ==
- Advanced Placement Awards
- College Board
- GCE Advanced Level
- Education in Canada
- Education in the United States
- International Baccalaureate
- 2020 AP exams controversy
