= AP Comparative Government and Politics =

Advanced Placement course and exam

Logo of AP Comparative Government and Politics as of 2025

Advanced Placement (AP) Comparative Government and Politics (also known as AP CoGo or AP CompGov) is an Advanced Placement comparative politics course and exam offered by the College Board. It was first administered in 1987.

== Course ==
To better match a typical introductory college course, changes were made to the course and the exam in the fall of 2005. These changes include the following:

- Greater emphasis on analysis of concepts and themes
- Shifting focus to coverage of six core countries: China, Iran, Mexico, Nigeria, Russia, and the United Kingdom (France and India were eliminated)
- Emphasis on themes such as citizen-state relations, democratization, globalization, political change, and public policy

== Nations examined ==
The countries whose politics, political institutions, policy making, and political cultures are examined are the following:

- Federal Republic of Nigeria (Nigeria)
- Islamic Republic of Iran (Iran)
- People's Republic of China (China)
- Russian Federation (Russia)
- United Kingdom of Great Britain and Northern Ireland (United Kingdom)
- United Mexican States (Mexico)

Former countries on the AP exam are the following:

- French Republic (France)
- Republic of India (India)

Note: For testing purposes, the College Board uses the names in parentheses when making reference to these sovereign entities.

== Exam ==
(Changed for the 2020 exam)

- 55 multiple choice questions in 60 minutes
  - 50% of score
    - Each question will have 4 options.
    - There will be 2 text-based sources, each one accompanied by 2–2 questions.
    - There will be 3 quantitative sources, each one accompanied by 2–2 questions.
- 4 free response questions in 90 minutes
  - 50% of score
    - 1 conceptual analysis question
    - 1 quantitative analysis question
    - 1 comparative analysis question
    - 1 argument essay requiring students to write an argument-based essay utilizing recalled evidence

=== Topics ===
- Political Systems, Regimes, and Governments (18–27%)
- Political Institutions (22–23%)
- Political Culture and Participation (11–28%)
- Party and Electoral Systems and Citizen Organizations (13–28%)
- Political and Economic Changes and Development (16–24%)

=== Grade distribution ===
Score	2015	2016	2017	2018	2019	2020	2021	2022	2023	2024	2025	2026
5	15.1%	20.5%	23.2%	20.6%	22.4%	24.4%	16.6%	15.9%	16.4%	16%	16%	15%
4	19.9%	21.2%	24.5%	22.5%	24.4%	27.4%	24.5%	24.3%	23.2%	24%	23%	22%
3	21.7%	20.4%	20.4%	19.8%	19.2%	18.4%	30.7%	30.3%	31.2%	33%	34%	33%
2	22.8%	21.5%	17.8%	20.9%	18.7%	17.3%	14.9%	16.7%	16.2%	15%	18%	8%
1	20.5%	16.4%	14.1%	16.2%	15.3%	12.5%	13.3%	12.9%	13.0%	12%	12%	12%
% of Scores 3 or Higher	56.7%	62.1%	68.1%	62.9%	66.0%	70.2%	71.8%	70.5%	70.8%	73%	73%	70%
Mean Score	2.86	3.08	3.25	3.10	3.20	3.34	3.16	3.14	3.14	3.17		
Standard Deviation	1.35	1.38	1.36	1.38	1.38	1.34	1.25	1.24	1.25	1.22		
Number of students	21,367	22,001	22,404	24,675	23,522	22,051	19,292	20,949	23,611	25,436	27,150	30,000
