= AP Physics 1 =

College Board exam

Advanced Placement (AP) Physics 1: Algebra Based (also known as AP Physics 1) is a year-long introductory physics course administered by the College Board as part of its Advanced Placement program. It is intended to proxy a one-semester algebra-based university course in mechanics. Along with AP Physics 2, the first AP Physics 1 exam was administered in 2015.

== History ==
The heavily computational AP Physics B course served as the College Board's algebra-based offering for four decades. As part of the College Board's redesign of science courses, AP Physics B was discontinued; therefore, AP Physics 1 and 2 were created with guidance from the National Research Council and the National Science Foundation. The course covers the material of a first-semester university undergraduate physics course offered at American universities that use best practices of physics pedagogy. The first AP Physics 1 classes had begun in the 2014–2015 school year, with the first AP exams administered in May 2015.

In its first five years, AP Physics 1 covered forces and motion, conservation laws, waves, and electricity. As of 2021, AP Physics 1 includes mechanics topics only.

In February 2024, College Board announced that there would be changes in curricula for their AP Physics classes for the 2025 exams. For AP Physics 1, this added fluids to the list of topics covered on the exam, now the last unit of the curriculum. Previously, this topic was covered as the first unit of AP Physics 2. In the revised curriculum, fluids cover 10-15% of the AP Physics 1 exam. College Board made other minor changes to the curriculum, such as providing equations for simple harmonic motion, connections between rotational and translational motion, and learning objectives related to power.

== Curriculum ==
AP Physics 1 is an algebra-based, introductory college-level physics course that includes mechanics topics such as motion, fluids, force, momentum, energy, harmonic motion, and rotation. The College Board published a curriculum framework that includes eight big ideas on which AP Physics 1 is based.

Questions for the exam are constructed with direct reference to items in the curriculum framework. Student understanding of each topic is tested regarding multiple skills—that is, questions require students to use quantitative, semi-quantitative, qualitative, and experimental reasoning in each content area.

Units	Exam Weighting
Kinematics	10-15%
Force and Translational Dynamics	18-23%
Work, Energy and Power	18-23%
Linear Momentum	10-15%
Torque and Rotational Dynamics	10-15%
Energy and Momentum of Rotating Systems	5-8%
Oscillations	5-8%
Fluids	10-15%

The content of AP Physics 1 overlaps significantly with that of AP Physics C: Mechanics. However, AP Physics 1 is algebra-based and lacks calculus-based concepts in AP Physics C: Mechanics. Another difference is that AP Physics C: Mechanics does not cover fluids, while AP Physics 1 does.

== Exam ==
Section	Questions	Time	Exam Weighting
Section I: Multiple Choice	40 MCQ	1 hour 20 minutes	50%
Section II: Free Response	4 FRQ	1 hour 40 minutes	50%

=== Science Practices Assessed ===
Multiple Choice and Free Response Sections of the AP Physics 1 exam are also assessed on scientific practices. Below are tables representing the practices assessed and their weighting for both parts of the exam

Section 1: Multiple Choice
Science Practice	Exam Weighting
2. Mathematical Routines	55-75%
3. Experimental Design and Analysis	25-35%

Section 2: Free Response
Science Practice	Exam Weighting
1. Translation Between Representations	20-35%
2. Mathematical Routines	30-40%
3. Experimental Design and Analysis	35-45%

=== Score distributions ===
The exam score distributions since 2015 are as follows:

Score	2015	2016	2017	2018	2019	2020	2021	2022	2023	2024	2025
5	5.0%	4.6%	5.4%	5.2%	6.2%	8.8%	6.9%	7.9%	8.8%	10.2%	19.8%
4	13.6%	14.0%	16.2%	15%	17.8%	17.9%	16.3%	17.0%	18.3%	17.9%	24.7%
3	20.7%	21.2%	20.3%	19.5%	20.6%	24.8%	18.9%	18.3%	18.5%	19.2%	22.9%
2	29.8%	30.2%	29.1%	29.1%	29.3%	26.5%	26.4%	27.1%	28.0%	26.1%	13.4%
1	31.0%	30.0%	29.0%	31.2%	26.1%	21.9%	31.4%	29.6%	26.4%	26.6%	19.2%
% of Scores 3 or Higher	39.2%	39.8%	41.9%	39.7%	44.6%	51.6%	42.1%	43.3%	45.6%	47.3%	67.3%
Mean	2.32	2.33	2.40	2.34	2.49	2.65	2.41	2.47	2.55	2.59	3.12
Standard Deviation	1.19	1.17	1.21	1.21	1.22	1.25	1.27	1.29	1.29	1.32	1.39
Number of Students	171,074	169,304	170,447	170,653	161,071	149,488	136,238	144,526	159,582	164,481	174,401

== See also ==
- AP Physics
