= AP Physics C: Mechanics =

Advanced Placement science course

Logo of AP Physics C: Mechanics as of 2026

Advanced Placement (AP) Physics C: Mechanics (also known as AP Mechanics) is an introductory physics course administered by the American College Board as part of its Advanced Placement program. It is intended to serve as a proxy for a one-semester calculus-based university course in mechanics. Physics C: Mechanics may be combined with its electricity and magnetism counterpart to form a year-long course that prepares for both exams.

== History ==
Before 1973, the topics of AP Physics C: Mechanics were covered in a singular AP Physics C exam, which included mechanics, electricity, magnetism, optics, fluids, and modern physics. In 1973, this exam was discontinued, and two new exams were created, which each covered Newtonian mechanics and electromagnetism.

Before 2006, test-takers paid only once and were given the choice of taking either one or two parts of the Physics C test. This was changed so that now test-takers have to pay twice to take both parts of the AP Physics C test.

As a result of the 2019–20 coronavirus pandemic, the AP examination in 2020 was taken online. The topics of oscillations and gravitation were removed from the test.

Before the 2024–25 school year, the multiple choice and free response section were each allotted 45 minutes, with 35 questions for the former and 3 questions for the latter. This made AP Physics C: Mechanics, along with Electricity and Magnetism, the shortest exams offered by College Board. Unlike other exams, the AP Physics C exams also had 5 options that test-takers could choose from, rather than the typical 4. This was changed in an announcement made by College Board in the February 2024 regarding changes to their AP Physics courses for the 2024–25 school year onward, which explained that the multiple choice sections would have 40 questions and the free response sections would have 4 questions. To compensate, College Board allotted 80 minutes for the multiple-choice section and 100 minutes for the free-response section for both exams, making them as long as the ones for AP Physics 1 and AP Physics 2.

== Curriculum ==
Intended to be equivalent to an introductory college course in mechanics for physics or engineering majors, the course modules are:

Topic	Exam Weighting
Kinematics	10–15%
Force and Translational Dynamics	20–25%
Work, Energy, and Power	15–25%
Linear Momentum	10–20%
Torque and Rotational Dynamics	10–15%
Energy and Momentum of Rotating Systems	10–15%
Oscillations	10–15%

Methods of calculus are used wherever appropriate in formulating physical principles and in applying them to physical problems. Therefore, students should have completed or be concurrently enrolled in a Calculus I class.

This course is often compared to AP Physics 1: Algebra Based for its similar course material involving kinematics, work, motion, forces, rotation, and oscillations. However, AP Physics 1: Algebra Based lacks concepts found in Calculus I, like derivatives or integrals. Another key difference is that AP Physics 1 covers fluids, which is not covered in the AP Physics C: Mechanics curriculum.

This course may be combined with AP Physics C: Electricity and Magnetism to make a unified Physics C course that prepares for both exams.

== Exam ==
Section	Questions	Time	Exam Weighting
Section I: Multiple Choice	40 MCQ	1 hour 20 minutes	50%
Section II: Free Response	4 FRQ	1 hour 40 minutes	50%

The course culminates in an optional exam for which high-performing students may receive some credit towards their college coursework, depending on the institution.

=== Science Practices Assessed ===
Multiple Choice and Free Response Sections of the AP Physics C: Mechanics exam are also assessed on scientific practices. Below are tables representing the practices assessed and their weighting for both parts of the exam

Section 1: Multiple Choice
Science Practice	Exam Weighting
2. Mathematical Routines	65-85%
3. Experimental Design and Analysis	20-35%

Section 2: Free Response
Science Practice	Exam Weighting
1. Creating Representations	20-35%
2. Mathematical Routines	40-45%
3. Scientific Questioning and Argumentation	30-35%

=== Grade distribution ===
The grade distributions since 2015 were:

Score	2015	2016	2017	2018	2019	2020	2021	2022	2023	2024	2025
5	30.1%	32.3%	36.4%	30.2%	37.7%	41.6%	23.5%	26.4%	26.4%	23%	21.7%
4	27.9%	27.0%	27.1%	27.3%	26.7%	26.4%	28.6%	25.7%	26.3%	29%	24.0%
3	20.0%	18.1%	15.8%	19.7%	17.4%	16.3%	21.3%	21.3%	20.7%	23%	27.5%
2	11.6%	13.1%	12.5%	12.7%	10.0%	9.2%	14.9%	15.6%	14.0%	14%	16.0%
1	10.5%	9.5%	8.1%	10.0%	8.2%	6.5%	11.6%	11.0%	12.5%	11%	10.9%
% of scores 3 or higher	77.9%	77.4%	79.4%	77.2%	81.8%	84.3%	73.5%	73.4%	73.5%	75%	73.2%
Mean	3.55	3.60	3.71	3.55	3.76	3.87	3.38	3.41	3.40	3.39	3.30
Standard deviation	1.31	1.31	1.29	1.31	1.28	1.23	1.30	1.32	1.34	1.28	1.27

== See also ==
- Physics
- Glossary of physics
