= AP Physics 2 =

College Board exam

Advanced Placement (AP) Physics 2 is a year-long introductory physics course administered by the College Board as part of its Advanced Placement program. It is intended to proxy a second-semester algebra-based university course in thermodynamics, electromagnetism, optics, and modern physics. Along with AP Physics 1, the first AP Physics 2 exam was administered in 2015.

== History ==
The AP Physics 2 classes began in the fall of 2014, with the first AP exams administered in May 2015. The courses were formed through collaboration between current Advanced Placement teachers and The College Board, with the guidance from the National Research Council and the National Science Foundation. In 2013 the College Board released a "Curriculum Framework" which includes the 7 principles on which AP Physics 2 would be based on as well as smaller "Enduring Understanding" concepts.

In February 2024, College Board announced that there would be changes in curricula for their AP Physics classes for the 2025 exams. For AP Physics 2, this removed fluids (the first topic of the curriculum) from the exam. From the 2024-25 school year onward, this topic is covered as the last unit of AP Physics 1. With fluids no longer being on the curriculum, the optics unit was separated into two units which cover the subject with more depth. This added mechanical waves, standing waves, sound waves, and the Doppler effect which are covered in Waves, Sound, and Physical Optics. The unit covering electric circuits was changed to be more comprehensive, and Blackbody radiation and Compton scattering were added to Modern Physics as well. As of the fall of 2024, all AP Physics 2 units are numbered sequentially to those in AP Physics 1, starting with Thermodynamics as unit 9 and ending with Modern Physics as unit 15.

== Curriculum ==
AP Physics 2 is an algebra-based, introductory college-level physics course in which students explore thermodynamics with kinetic theory; PV diagrams and probability; electrostatics; electrical circuits with capacitors; magnetic fields; electromagnetism; physical and geometric optics; and quantum, atomic, and nuclear physics. Through inquiry-based learning, students develop scientific critical thinking and reasoning skills.

Units	Exam Weighting
Thermodynamics	15-18%
Electric Force, Field, and Potential	15-18%
Electric Circuits	15-18%
Magnetism and Electromagnetism	12-15%
Geometric Optics	12-15%
Waves, Sound and Physical Optics	12-15%
Modern Physics	12-15%

The content of AP Physics 2 overlaps with that of AP Physics C: Electricity and Magnetism, but Physics 2 is algebra-based, while Physics C is calculus-based. AP Physics C: Electricity and Magnetism also is focused entirely on Electricity and Magnetism while AP Physics 2 covers additional topics such as Thermodynamics, Waves, and Modern Physics.

== Exam ==
Section	Questions	Time	Exam Weighting
Section I: Multiple Choice	42 MCQ	1 hour 25 minutes	50%
Section II: Free Response	4 FRQ	1 hour 35 minutes	50%

=== Science Practices Assessed ===
Section 1: Multiple Choice
Science Practice	Exam Weighting
2. Translation Between Representations	55-75%
3. Experimental Design and Analysis	25-35%

Section 2: Free Response
Science Practice	Exam Weighting
1. Mathematical Routines	20-35%
2. Translation Between Representations	30-40%
3. Experimental Design and Analysis	35-45%

=== Score Distributions ===
The score distributions since 2015 were:

Score	2015	2016	2017	2018	2019	2020 (online)	2021	2022	2023	2024	2025
5	8.5%	9.5%	12.9%	13.1%	14.2%	14.0%	15.4%	16.3%	16.5%	15%	21.8%
4	13.7%	17.0%	16.7%	15.6%	21.0%	24.3%	17.9%	18.1%	18.5%	18%	28.8%
3	33.5%	34.9%	34.0%	34.4%	30.2%	35.0%	32.0%	35.3%	34.9%	35%	22.0%
2	34.8%	30.6%	27.6%	29.2%	26.2%	21.3%	27.0%	24.1%	23.8%	25%	20.2%
1	9.6%	8.1%	8.9%	7.7%	8.4%	5.4%	7.6%	6.3%	6.4%	7%	7.2%
% of scores 3 or higher	55.6%	61.3%	63.5%	63.1%	65.4%	73.3%	65.3%	69.7%	69.8%	68%	72.6%
Mean	2.77	2.89	2.97	2.97	3.06	3.20	3.06	3.14	3.15	3.09	
Standard Deviation	1.07	1.08	1.15	1.13	1.17	1.09	1.17	1.14	1.15	1.14	
Number of Students	20,533	26,385	24,985	25,741	23,802	21,835	18,736	17,842	20,453	-	

== See also ==
- Glossary of physics
- Science education in the United States
