= Free response question =

Type of open-ended question

A free response question (FRQ) or essay question is a type of open-ended question commonly used in schools to test students' learning, as well as in entrance exams and sometimes as part of job application or screening processes.

== Description ==
Free response questions require test takers to respond to a question or open-ended prompt with a prose response. In addition to being graded for factual correctness, free response questions may also be graded for persuasiveness, style, and demonstrated mastery of the subject material. Free response questions are a common part of assessment tests in schools, as well as being part of standardized tests Essay questions are also sometimes included as part of a job interview or a school application process.

Free response questions typically require little work for instructors to write, but can be difficult to grade consistently as they require subjective judgments. Free response tests are a relatively effective test of higher-level reasoning, as the format requires test-takers to provide more of their reasoning in the answer than multiple choice questions. Students, however, report higher levels of anxiety when taking essay questions as compared to short-response or multiple choice exams.

== See also ==
- Multiple choice
- Closed-ended question
