= List of The Daily Show episodes (2024) =

- No. of episodes: 139

Release
- Original network: Comedy Central
- Original release: February 12 – December 12, 2024

Season chronology
- ← Previous; 2023 episodes Next → 2025 episodes

This is a list of episodes for The Daily Show, a late-night talk and satirical news television program airing on Comedy Central, during 2024.

Following the departure of host Trevor Noah at the end of 2022, a series of guest hosts from both within and outside The Daily Show's correspondents roster filled the program's anchor chair throughout 2023, each sitting in for a one-week assignment. On January 24, 2024, it was announced that Jon Stewart would return to the show he had hosted from 1999 to 2015. This time around, in addition to serving as an executive producer, Stewart would host one episode per week, primarily on Mondays; Stewart's hosting commitment was originally planned to run through the 2024 U.S. election cycle, though it would be announced on October 28 that he would continue as a once-per-week host through December 2025. The rest of the week, members of "The Best F#@king News Team" would rotate hosting duties.

Unless otherwise indicated, The Daily Show episodes were pre-taped, though live-to-air shows would take place throughout the year, including the concluding nights of the Republican and Democratic national conventions, the nights of presidential and vice-presidential debates, and Election Night. Also unless indicated, episodes were taped at TDS's longtime home at NEP Studio 52 on 11th Avenue in New York City, though the show did originate from Chicago's Athenaeum Center for Thought & Culture the week of the Democratic Convention (August 19–22). The show had planned to do the same in Milwaukee the week that city hosted the RNC (July 15–18), but instead returned to New York for three shows (July 16–18), with Stewart noting that the Milwaukee theater where the show set up was shifted from a "soft" to "hard" security perimeter in the wake of GOP candidate Donald Trump’s attempted assassination.

== 2024 episodes ==
=== February ===
No. overall	No. in season	Date	Hosted by	Guest(s)	Promotion
3853	1	February 12	Jon Stewart	Zanny Minton Beddoes	The Economist
Jon returns to The Daily Show after nine years (“Now, where was I?”) and, after a few jokes about Super Bowl LVIII, launches "InDecision 2024" coverage by highlighting concern and dissatisfaction over the same elderly candidates from the 2020 U.S. presidential election facing off again four years later; "The Best F**kin' News Team" visits a diner to gauge voters' opinions on the election; The Economist editor-in-chief Zanny Minton Beddoes discusses Joe Biden's second-term potential, what Donald Trump doesn't understand about NATO, and Republicans' focus on national conservatism ahead of economic liberalism.
3854	2	February 13	Jordan Klepper	Killer Mike	Michael
Jordan opines on Donald Trump questioning the "missing" status of Nikki Haley's husband (he's actually overseas on National Guard service), then "Fingers the Pulse" of Haley and Trump supporters in South Carolina; Jordan and Desi Lydic offer ideas on how the GOP can enrage their base should they ever reach accordance with Democrats on border security; Killer Mike discuss his wins (and his arrest) at the Grammys and the role of spirituality in his life.
3855	3	February 14	Jordan Klepper	Joshua Green Lashana Lynch	Bloomberg Businessweek; The Rebels Bob Marley: One Love
Coverage of votes in the House (to impeach Homeland Security secretary Alejandro Mayorkas) and New York's 3rd congressional district (to replace George Santos); Troy Iwata just wants to take the next commuter train out of Long Island; Joshua Green on economic populism within the Democratic Party; Lashana Lynch on meeting Rita Marley and depicting the singer's life on screen.
3856	4	February 15	Jordan Klepper	Cord Jefferson	American Fiction
Jordan laments the shooting incident at the Kansas City Chiefs' victory rally; a bar association HR rep (Desi Lydic) lists "simple rules to maintain integrity" when prosecuting Donald Trump; Grace Kuhlenschmidt swoons over adulterous U.S. presidents; Cord Jefferson on adapting the novel Erasure into American Fiction and making sure the film was "satirical but never farcical."
3857	5	February 19	Jon Stewart	Melissa Murray & Kate A. Shaw	Strict Scrutiny
Jon acknowledges the left's negative reactions over his Joe Biden/Donald Trump critique on his first show back, then delivers his own harsh words about Tucker Carlson's trip to Russia and interview with Vladimir Putin; Michael Kosta, at a "candy store" Pyongyang, North Korea, on why dictators get such a bad rap; law professors Melissa Murray (NYU Law) and Kate Shaw (Penn Carey Law) discuss the cases against Trump and the former president's legal immunity claims; "Your Moment of Zen" (footage of Putin admitting dissatisfaction over his interview with Carlson).
3858	6	February 20	Desi Lydic	Danai Gurira	The Walking Dead: The Ones Who Live
"InDecision 2024" coverage of Nikki Haley's campaign being in "the 'not knowing when to leave the party' stage" and Donald Trump comparing himself to Alexei Navalny; an ad for Trump's Victory 47 cologne ("grab her by the nostrils"); Josh Johnson gauges sneakerheads' thoughts on Trump-branded golden sneakers; Ronny Chieng on an Alabama Supreme Court ruling that declares embryos are humans under state law; Danai Gurira on continuing the Michonne & Rick love story from The Walking Dead and creating the women's advocacy group Love Our Girls.
3859	7	February 21	Desi Lydic	Maite Alberdi	The Eternal Memory
"InDecision 2024" (what Donald Trump is looking for in a running mate); Jordan Klepper analyses Fox News' annoyance over credibility issues surrounding an FBI informant in the Biden impeachment inquiry; Michael Kosta discovers why Duluth, Minnesota is attractive to "coastal elites" escaping climate change effects; Maite Alberdi discusses chronicling a married couple living with the husband's Alzheimer's diagnosis.
3860	8	February 22	Desi Lydic	Jason Isbell	Weathervanes; Killers of the Flower Moon
Troy Iwata on an outage that affected AT&T's cellular network; Desi challenges the characterization of Nikki Haley being politically moderate in "InDecision 2024"; Jason Isbell discusses his first screen acting experience in Killers of the Flower Moon and how his life and political perspectives inspire his songwriting; Isbell also performs "Cast Iron Skillet" from his album Weathervanes.
3861	9	February 26	Jon Stewart	Murtaza Hussain; Yair Rosenberg	The Intercept; The Atlantic and MSNBC
Jon discusses the Gaza war engulfing "The Futile Crescent" and, after criticizing the apparent inability of their allies to do anything about it, offers solutions on establishing peace between Israel and Hamas, including a "Middle East Treaty Organization" — or "METO" ("Let's get this region Me Too’d!"); Murtaza Hussain and Yair Rosenberg discuss how peace may be possible between Israel and Palestine, the involvement of the U.S. and other countries in the Middle East, and how people can respect each others' differing religious and cultural backgrounds; Jon emotionally dedicates "Your Moment of Zen" to Dipper, his family's late rescue pit bull and member of "the OG Daily Show dog crew."
3862	10	February 27	Michael Kosta	Kwame Alexander	This Is the Honey; Why Fathers Cry at Night
"Headlines" coverage of Joe Biden discussing Israel/Palestine ceasefire prospects over ice cream and panel discussion titles at CPAC; Ronny Chieng gives a new definition to "flipping burgers" while reporting on Wendy's "surge pricing" plans; Bradley Whitford narrates "The Daily Showography" of "Robert F. Kennedy, Jr.: Immune to Normal"; Kwame Alexander discusses the joyous title and tone of the anthology This Is the Honey, and reads his own poem "10 Reasons Why Fathers Cry at Night."
3863	11	February 28	Michael Kosta	Sloane Crosley	Grief is for People
"Headlines" examines Supreme Court arguments over bump stocks and the disastrous Willy's Chocolate Experience in Scotland; "InDecision 2024" (native Michiganders Michael and Jordan Klepper on why some Democrats voted "uncommitted" in that state's presidential primary); "The People Behind the People" follows "Dr. Dennis Lowry-Stein," the neurologist monitoring American leaders' cognitive functions; Sloane Crosley on grieving over loss through a lens of laughter; "Your Moment of Zen" (an in memoriam to Richard Lewis).
3864	12	February 29	Michael Kosta	Rex Chapman	It's Hard for Me to Live with Me; Owned podcast
Michael on the GOP's varying stances toward IVF and FDA plans for labeling healthy foods; Desi Lydic on the Supreme Court not immediately considering Donald Trump's immunity claims; Dulcé Sloan recommends who to honor on her "Black Women's History Day"; Rex Chapman talks of prioritizing basketball over school studies as a kid and his relationship with his father, and offers advice to young athletes and others struggling with anxiety and addiction.

=== March ===
No. overall	No. in season	Date	Hosted by	Guest(s)	Promotion
3865	13	March 4	Jon Stewart	Jonathan Blitzer	The New Yorker; Everyone Who Is Gone Is Here
Desi Lydic brainstorms how Democrats can still be happy even after a Supreme Court ruling that states cannot block Donald Trump from the ballot; Jon criticizes the fearmongering over migrants crossing the Mexico–United States border; Jonathan Blitzer on approaching the border situation "in a kind of commonsensical way."
3866	14	March 5	Ronny Chieng	Yuval Noah Harari	Unstoppable Us, Vol. 2: Why the World Isn't Fair
"InDecision 2024" coverage of Kyrsten Sinema's plans to depart the Senate and AI images of Donald Trump with "Black friends"; Josh Johnson reports from "Sesame Street" on Cookie Monster criticizing "shrinkflation"; "Jordan Klepper Fingers the Pulse" (Jordan asks "Biden or Trump?" to Nikki Haley supporters in Raleigh); Yuval Noah Harari on how the past helps humans understand the present.
3867	15	March 6	Ronny Chieng	Chelsea Peretti	First Time Female Director
"InDecision 2024" (the aftermath of Super Tuesday and Nikki Haley's suspension of her campaign); Grace Kuhlenschmidt and Michael Kosta on why Jason Palmer and "uncommitted" had significant nights in American Samoa and Minnesota, respectively; Ronny on the bigoted opinions of the GOP's nominee for North Carolina governor; Chelsea Peretti discusses going from standup comedy to TV work to directing a movie that premiered at Tribeca.
3868	16	March 7	Ronny Chieng	Awkwafina	Kung Fu Panda 4
A look at big drops by the CDC (COVID isolation guidelines) and the U.S. military (aid into Gaza), as well as the TSA testing airport self-service screenings; Troy Iwata on the National Guard as a New York City Subway crime deterrent; residents of Eagle Pass, Texas tell Michael Kosta they're tired of more than one invading mass; Awkwafina and Ronny interview each other about their roles in Kung Fu Panda 4.
3869	17	March 11	Jon Stewart	Steven Levitsky	Harvard University; Tyranny of the Minority; How Democracies Die
"Like Pacino at the Oscars," Jon talks about Joe Biden's State of the Union Address and Katie Britt's GOP rebuttal, then calls out conservatives for professing American patriotism while endorsing Donald Trump's authoritarian rhetoric; Steven Levitsky on how "improvisation" shaped an imperfect Constitution and the importance of improving democratic institutions.
3870	18	March 12	Desi Lydic & Michael Kosta	Jane Marie	Selling the Dream
Michael reveals his show salary ("$65 a week") in acknowledging Equal Pay Day; "InDecision 2024" coverage of Donald Trump loyalists taking over RNC leadership and Robert K. Hur defending remarks about Joe Biden's memory in his classified documents report; Desi and Michael dramatically read actual Biden quotes from the transcript of his testimony with Hur; "senior Royal watcher" Grace Kuhlenschmidt on the controversy over an edited photo of Princess Kate with her children; Jane Marie on the attraction of, and difficulty in regulating, multi-level marketing.
3871	19	March 13	Desi Lydic & Michael Kosta	David Alan Grier	The American Society of Magical Negroes
"InDecision 2024" (the possibility of Aaron Rodgers being RFK, Jr's running mate and South Dakota's governor promoting a Texas cosmetic dentist); Desi, Michael, and Ronny Chieng examine legislation forcing TikTok to be sold or be banned; "Back in Black" (Lewis Black analyzes AI's problems with racial and gender stereotypes); David Alan Grier on being the Oscars' "voice of God," satirizing the "Magical Negro" trope, and his belief that the comedy of In Living Color couldn't be replicated in the 2020s.
3872	20	March 14	Desi Lydic & Michael Kosta	Renée Elise Goldsberry	Girls5eva
Desi and Michael examine Donald Trump's belief that no president was treated more "badly" than him, Elon Musk's abrupt cancellation of Don Lemon's X show, and more safety issues with Boeing planes; "the Best F**kin' News Team" cover "DemocRusski 2024"; how Miami Beach and Fort Lauderdale are taking different approaches toward spring breakers; Renée Elise Goldsberry on how Girls5eva's characters inspire both her and the show's audience; "Your Moment of Zen" (local TV anchors go pie-crazy on Pi Day).
3873	21	March 25	Jon Stewart	Gary Clark, Jr.	JPEG Raw
Jon analyzes the outcome of New York State's investigation into Donald Trump's real estate empire, and criticizes Kevin O'Leary's contention that overvaluing properties is a "victimless crime" ("Avoiding taxes hurts all of us"); before performing his song "Habits," Gary Clark, Jr. discusses collaborating with Stevie Wonder and George Clinton on JPEG Raw, and how time alone during the pandemic allowed him to branch out musically; "Your Moment of Zen" (Marc Thiessen claims that Trump is facing more indictments than Charles Manson).
3874	22	March 26	Jordan Klepper	Jim Sciutto	CNN; The Return of Great Powers: Russia, China, and the Next World War
"Headlines" coverage of "America's Defendant-in-Chief" selling Bibles and instant conspiracy theories about the Francis Scott Key Bridge collapse; Josh Johnson on Florida's new law barring social media accounts for children; Jordan analyzes GOP efforts to woo female voters by showing empathy about abortion; a film trailer for What Women Voters Want finds an anti-abortion lawmaker (Michael Kosta) magically becoming a pregnant woman (Desi Lydic); Jim Sciutto discusses American relations with Russia and China, and how communication and learning form history can help avoid nuclear conflict.
3875	23	March 27	Jordan Klepper	Byron Tau	NOTUS; Means of Control
Jordan posits that the internal uproar at NBC News over their (brief) hire of Ronna McDaniel can be a blueprint to countering conservatives' mainstreaming of January 6 rioters; "InDecision 2024" (Michael Kosta fields thoughts from Robert F. Kennedy, Jr. supporters at the Oakland campaign rally introducing his running mate); Byron Tau discusses companies' and governments' use of technological data to track people for targeted advertising or even nefarious purposes.
3876	24	March 28	Jordan Klepper	Huey Lewis	The Heart of Rock and Roll
Jordan criticizes a big-dollar Joe Biden campaign fundraising event ("Save that money for a Supreme Court justice"); Grace Kuhlenschmidt thinks of ideas to avoid a congestion pricing plan for vehicles entering Manhattan; "In My Opinion" (Leslie Jones can't believe America could elect Donald Trump president again, among other "obviously stupid" decisions); Huey Lewis discusses developing a musical based on his song book, and recalls making music videos and "We Are the World" in the 80s.

=== April ===
No. overall	No. in season	Date	Hosted by	Guest(s)	Promotion
3877	25	April 1	Jon Stewart	Lina Khan	Federal Trade Commission
Jon critiques news channels' hesitancy toward a Donald Trump-shared image of a hog-tied Joe Biden ("aren't you the same networks who show reruns of 9/11 every year?"), then analyzes the promises and perils of artificial intelligence ("the reality is they [AI tools] come for our jobs"); Jon chats with someone Apple TV+ dissuaded him from interviewing for The Problem's companion podcast — FTC chair Lina Khan, who discusses the Commission's efforts to combat businesses' monopolistic behaviors.
3878	26	April 2	Desi Lydic	U.S. Representative Colin Allred	2024 U.S. Senate campaign in Texas
"Headlines" coverage of Truth Social's billion-dollar stock market loss, a mixed verdict for abortion rights at Florida's Supreme Court, and the NCAA tournament's popularizing of women's basketball; Desi and Josh Johnson use ED innuendo to discuss asymmetrical 3-point distances at one women's tourney venue; "Thank Me Later" (Michael Kosta joins a New Yorker on the lookout for "ghost plates"); Colin Allred discusses his campaign for Senate against Ted Cruz and his support of paternity leave and women's reproductive rights; "Your Moment of Zen" (a Fox Business analyst notes that web searches for Truth Social's "$DJT" ticker symbol bring up something else).
3879	27	April 3	Desi Lydic	Alison Brie	Apples Never Fall
Desi analyses conservatives' tantrums over International Transgender Day of Visibility falling on the same day as Easter 2024, while Michael Kosta thinks the calendar coincidence led to "the most successful Trans Visibility Day in history"; "In My Opinion" (Charlamagne tha God criticizes corporate America's embrace, and the right wing's weaponizing, of DEI initiatives); Alison Brie discusses the family dynamics depicted in Apples Never Fall, and recalls how working on GLOW inspired her to work behind the camera.
3880	28	April 4	Desi Lydic	Ken Harbaugh & Sebastian Junger	Against All Enemies
"Headlines" (New York's MTA wants reimbursement for bridge tolls lost to the marathon, efforts in Nebraska to move its electoral college vote from by-district to winner-takes-all, and businesses capitalize on the upcoming solar eclipse); Ronny Chieng and Jordan Klepper argue whether the sun or the moon is "the real star" of the eclipse; an ad for "Trump Elementary," where "the smartest person alive" teaches every class; Against All Enemies producers Ken Harbaugh and Sebastian Junger discuss the threat of extremist groups and why military veterans find them beguiling.
3881	29	April 8	Jon Stewart	Christiane Amanpour	CNN; The Amanpour Hour
Jon mocks Fox News and Marjorie Taylor Greene for putting immigration and religious spins on the solar eclipse and northeast earthquake; Ronny Chieng and Grace Kuhlenschmidt take starkly different attitudes toward covering the celestial event; "The Futile Crescent" (Jon compares the American government's reaction to the war and famine in Gaza to its stance against Russian atrocities in Ukraine); Christiane Amanpour on Muslim countries' abandonment of Palestinians and the dangers journalists face in Gaza; "Your Moment of Zen" (CNN's Boris Sanchez and Brianna Keilar "set aside all journalistic credibility" while wearing sun and moon costumes).
3882	30	April 9	Michael Kosta	Alex Garland	Civil War
"Headlines" (post-eclipse Google searches for "my eyes hurt" and the sentencing of the Oxford High School gunman's parents); "InDecision 2024" (Josh Johnson on President Biden's student debt relief plan); a look at Donald Trump's new campaign stance of leaving abortion restrictions to the states; Alex Garland on making journalists Civil War's protagonists and wanting the film to inspire conversation instead of division.
3883	31	April 10	Michael Kosta	Vampire Weekend (Chris Baio, Ezra Koenig, Chris Tomson)	Only God Was Above Us
Coverage of plans to increase the postage rate and reduce "forever chemicals" in drinking water; Michael and Troy Iwata analyze pressure on Sonia Sotomayor to retire from the Supreme Court; the members of Vampire Weekend discuss living and working in Los Angeles, their Vampire Campfire podcast, and the inspirations behind the title and cover of Only God Was Above Us and the song "Mary Boone" (which they also perform); "Your Moment of Zen" (Donald Trump orders "the Lord's chicken").
3884	32	April 11	Michael Kosta	Hanif Abdurraqib	There's Always This Year
A look at Republicans' love-hate reactions to the reinstatement of Arizona's 1864 anti-abortion law; "Men Talk About Abortion" finds two toupee-wearing, cigar-chomping bros (Michael and Jordan Klepper) claiming that going out-of-state for abortion care isn't the worst thing in the world for a woman; an ad for "Stair Sherpa," burly men who lift politicians seeking to avoid embarrassing stair stumbles; Hanif Abdurraquib on appreciating time and mortality through basketball, and how nostalgia for the past can be a tool for improving one's present.
3885	33	April 15	Jon Stewart	David E. Sanger	The New York Times; New Cold Wars
Jon covers Iran's attack on Israel (and conservative media declaring it World War III) before diving into Donald Trump's campaign speech near Gettysburg and the first day of Trump's trial in New York; Ronny Chieng and Desi Lydic argue whether Trump is "Team Mandela" or "Team Jesus" (parodying comparisons of the former president to those historical figures), while Josh Johnson interrupts to say that Trump is "Team O.J."; David Sanger on how America's post-Cold War arrogance led to an underestimating of Russian and Chinese imperialism.
3886	34	April 16	Dulcé Sloan	Mayan Lopez	Lopez vs. Lopez
"America's Most Tremendously Wanted" (Dulcé reminds viewers what the latest Donald Trump trial is about, and analyzes the excuses potential jurors and Trump himself are giving to get out of the case); "Jordan Klepper Fingers the Pulse" (Jordan interviews Andrew Giuliani and other Trump supporters outside the court house in Manhattan); "In My Opinion" (John Leguizamo on how Trump and Joe Biden are courting the Latino vote); Mayan Lopez on guest judging RuPaul's Drag Race, making a Latino-centered sitcom, and using "sitcom Mayan" to have real-live conversations with her father and co-star, George Lopez.
3887	35	April 17	Dulcé Sloan	Orlando Bloom	Orlando Bloom: To the Edge
Dulcé summarizes Nike's skimpy Team USA women's track uniforms, Jontay Porter's gambling-related ban from the NBA, and Red Lobster's possible bankruptcy; "America's Most Tremendously Wanted" (Donald Trump visits a New York bodega as 7 jurors are selected for his trial); Josh Johnson wants to be on the Trump jury for lucrative reasons; Dulcé samples wines with the proprietors a Black-owned winery tour service in Georgia; Orlando Bloom discusses participating in extreme sports (e.g. wingsuiting, freediving) for his Peacock docuseries.
3888	36	April 18	Dulcé Sloan	Brittney Spencer	My Stupid Life
"Headlines" coverage of "Capitol Hill Karen" (as Dulcé refers to Marjorie Taylor Greene) railing on House Speaker Mike Johnson, the Kennedy family endorsing Joe Biden (and not RFK Jr.), and Donald Trump demanding a fundraising cut from other GOP candidates; "America's Most Tremendously Wanted" (Dulcé and Troy Iwata on the news media divulging demographics of Trump trial jurors); Josh Johnson gets tips on how to avoid paying taxes like the wealthy do; Brittney Spencer on being a Black woman in contemporary country music and appearing on Beyoncé's cover of “Blackbird”; "Your Moment of Zen" (RSBN's Brian Glenn admits he hasn't seen “as much [homelessness and chaos in New York] as I thought I would”).
3889	37	April 22	Jon Stewart	Salman Rushdie	Knife: Meditations After an Attempted Murder
"America's Most Tremendously Wanted" finds Jon excoriating the media for its lack of self-control in excessively covering Donald Trump's trial, prompting a dissenting opinion from TDS alum Jessica Williams ("Why you gotta be all 'get off my lawn' about it?"); Salman Rushdie discusses his healing journey following his August 2022 stabbing and the fight for free expression in the United States.
3890	38	April 23	Ronny Chieng & Jordan Klepper	Stephanie Kelton	Finding the Money; The Deficit Myth
"America's Most Tremendously Wanted" explores a hearing (or hearings, as Desi Lydic reports) into whether Donald Trump violated a court-imposed gag order; Ronny and Jordan examine Jesse Watters' belief that Trump's required presence at the trial is torturous for Trump, as well as Joe Biden's implying that "cannibals" in New Guinea ate his uncle during World War II; an ad for "Rant-a-Car," a vehicle rental service for those needing to gripe on social media behind a steering wheel; Stephanie Kelton explains the modern monetary theory and positive aspects of the national deficit.
3891	39	April 24	Ronny Chieng & Jordan Klepper	U.S. Representative Andy Kim	2024 U.S. Senate campaign in New Jersey
"Headlines" (President Biden signs a foreign aid package; new refund rights for airline passengers); Grace Kuhlenschmidt on Tennessee allowing school teachers to carry guns; Patrick McEnroe analyzes a pickleball showdown pitting Ronny and former tennis pro Michael Kosta vs. "The Pickleball Twins"; Andy Kim on working in Congress (“the world’s worst reality TV show”), his campaign for Bob Menendez's Senate seat, and how America can solidify its global role in the 21st century.
3892	40	April 25	Ronny Chieng & Jordan Klepper	Kyle Chayka	The New Yorker; Filterworld: How Algorithms Flattened Culture
"America's Most Tremendously Wanted" finds Donald Trump derisively accepting Bill Barr's endorsement, seeing David Pecker testify about catching and killing negative press on Trump's behalf, and hearing Supreme Court arguments over his presidential immunity claims; Michael Kosta discusses why Trump is both "Donny from the block" and "not a regular person"; a look at escalating conflicts between law enforcement and pro-Palestinian protestors on college campuses; Kyle Chayka on how algorithms have made people more passive and their tastes more homogeneous.

=== May ===
No. overall	No. in season	Date	Hosted by	Guest(s)	Promotion
3893	41	May 6	Jordan Klepper	Jonathan Haidt	The Anxious Generation; New York University Stern School of Business
Jordan on Donald Trump risking jail time for contempt of court; "InDecision 2024" examines "a classic Trump beauty pageant" of VP contenders at Mar-a-Lago, Tim Scott "pre-denying" the 2024 election results, and Kristi Noem facing backlash for shooting her dog; Michael Kosta on how any form of killing animals is "just life on the farm"; Jordan and Josh Johnson on the Drake–Kendrick Lamar feud; Jonathan Haidt discusses his theory that technological influences and protective parenting have led to a mental "rewiring" of younger generations, and lists "four norms" that can give kids a chance at a real childhood.
3894	42	May 7	Jordan Klepper	Lexi Freiman	The Book of Ayn
"Headlines" coverage of the 2024 Met Gala and Vladimir Putin's latest inauguration in Russia; "America's Most Tremendously Wanted" (Stormy Daniels gives dirty details about her encounter with Donald Trump, resulting in what Troy Iwata calls an "uncomfy" mood at the New York court house); Desi Lydic joins a group earning cash rewards for reporting idling vehicles to police; Lexi Freiman discusses writing about narcissism and the benefits of cancel culture and shedding one's ego.
3895	43	May 8	Jordan Klepper	Matt Damon	Kiss the Future
"InDecision 2024" reviews Kristi Noem's rough time on conservative-friendly networks and RFK, Jr's claim of once having had a parasitic brain worm; a dirt-eating "Desi Lordic or whatever" extols the positives of worms in brains; "Back in Black" (Lewis Black on Tesla's financial and design problems); Kiss the Future producer Matt Damon on how Sarajevo's underground music scene flourished during the Bosnian War (and attracted the attention of U2).
3896	44	May 9	Jon Stewart	John Della Volpe	Harvard Institute of Politics; SocialSphere; Fight: How Gen Z is Channeling Their Fear and Passion to Save America
Jon discusses the media's obsessive coverage of the Donald Trump trial, as well as conservatives' "false outrage" over the Boy Scouts' name change, the Biden Administration's withholding armaments to Israel, and new appliance energy standards; "The Best F**kin' News Team" shames Jon after he critiques Trump's own shaming of Joe Biden's Jewish supporters; John Della Volpe discusses conducting the Harvard Youth Poll and how the issues and experiences of Gen Z can differ from those of older generations; "Your Moment of Zen" turns the GOP's defense of gas stoves into a film trailer for Saving Pilot Lightin' ("Leave no appliance behind").
3897	45	May 13	Jon Stewart	Ilana Glazer	Babes
Jon discusses the federal corruption trial of U.S. Senator Bob Menendez, then rhetorically asks Menendez "How Dumb Is You?" for accepting bribes when other politicians and judges have for years taken advantage of "legal corruption"; Ilana Glazer on accurately depicting pregnancy and motherhood in Babes, test audiences' reactions to the film, and her on- and off-screen repartee with co-star Michelle Buteau; "Your Moment of Zen" (a supercut of Donald Trump praising Hannibal Lecter at campaign rallies).
3898	46	May 14	Desi Lydic	Miranda July	All Fours
"America's Most Tremendously Wanted" (GOP lawmakers defend Donald Trump outside his trial); the New York-Dublin Portal attracts inappropriate behavior; Desi, Josh Johnson, and Ronny Chieng have varied success with OpenAI's flirtatious new "omni" update; "The Daily Showography" of New York's "philosopher king," Eric Adams; Miranda July on writing "a coming of age story" about women in their 40s.
3899	47	May 15	Desi Lydic	Amy Ryan	Sugar; Doubt: A Parable
Charles III's first official portrait as Great Britain's king has people literally seeing red; "InDecision 2024" covers Joe Biden challenging Donald Trump to a debate, while Michael Kosta proposes the debate's terms; Ronny Chieng and Jordan Klepper argue (and offer wagers) over Caitlin Clark's WNBA debut, Harrison Butker's commencement speech, and other topics in "Sports War"; Amy Ryan on playing opposite Colin Farrell in Sugar and joining Doubt's cast on a week's notice.
3900	48	May 16	Desi Lydic	Helen Rebanks & Nick Offerman	The Farmer's Wife: My Life in Days; Civil War; Where The Deer and the Antelope Play
"America's Most Tremendously Wanted" (Donald Trump's defense team tries to make Michael Cohen "seem less credible than a Boeing in-flight safety video"); Bob Menendez blames his wife for his corruption; Josh Johnson on why two Virginia schools reverting back to their former Confederate-honoring names isn't entirely a bad thing; an ad for "Joe Biden's Build Bods Better," which allows one to bulk up while tensing over the president's public speaking stumbles; Helen Rebanks on celebrating the farm life and attracting a working friendship with Nick Offerman.
3901	49	May 20	Jon Stewart	Frank J Fahrenkopf, Jr.	Commission on Presidential Debates
Noting the fallout from Harrison Butker's college commencement speech, Jon calls out the hypocrisy of conservatives complaining about (and profiting from complaining about) "cancel culture" while practicing what they preach against (i.e. shouting down Donald Trump's critics); Frank Fahrenkopf discusses Trump and Joe Biden bypassing the non-partisan debates commission, and how debates are still an important voter tool that can be improved upon.
Special	Special	May 20	Jordan Klepper	n/a	n/a
The Daily Show Presents: Jordan Klepper Fingers the Pulse - Moscow Tools; Jordan examines why American Republicans and the MAGA movement find Vladimir Putin's Russia so alluring, and whether they have become the Kremlin's "useful idiots." The special features interviews with former UN ambassador John Bolton and Estonian prime minister Kaja Kallas.
3902	50	May 21	Michael Kosta	Sebastian Junger	In My Time of Dying: How I Came Face to Face with the Idea of an Afterlife
"America's Most Tremendously Wanted" (Donald Trump doesn't testify in his defense after long saying he wanted to); "Headlines" (Rudy Giuliani serves up coffee after being served an indictment, and an Australian billionaire wants her portrait removed from a gallery exhibition); Ronny Chieng on how "you can't trust these f**kin' nerds" in the wake of OpenAI stealing Scarlett Johansson's voice; "The People Behind the People" hears from "Dahlia Rose Hibiscus," Kamala Harris's "holistic thought advisor"; Sebastian Junger on having a new lease on life, and considering an afterlife, following his ruptured aneurysm.
3903	51	May 22	Michael Kosta	JB Smoove	Curb Your Enthusiasm
"InDecision 2024" finds Michael critiquing a Guardian opinion poll showing Americans disbelieving the buoyant economy, as well as RFK, Jr.'s courting of meme stock traders; Michael and Josh Johnson on Donald Trump's (false) claim that Joe Biden sought his assassination during the Mar-a-Lago raid; Troy Iwata interviews a Biden "superfan"; JB Smoove equates stand-up comedians to therapists, and discusses how he's different from Leon Black and planning a post-Curb life.
3904	52	May 23	Michael Kosta	John Legend	Afghan Star podcast
"Headlines" (daily weed use surpasses that of alcohol, Nikki Haley backhandedly endorses Donald Trump, and Samuel Alito lets his radical flag fly); Troy Iwata doesn't understand the meaning of Alito's flags ("if you're gonna be hateful, stop being so subtle"); "Michael Kosta Gives You Just the Tip" (headline-based advice on avoiding dumb travel mistakes); John Legend on documenting the history of an Afghani TV singing competition that re-instilled love of music in the nation after and before Taliban rule.

=== June ===
No. overall	No. in season	Date	Hosted by	Guest(s)	Promotion
3905	53	June 3	Jon Stewart	Former U.S. Rep. Ken Buck	n/a
Jon comes to defense of the American legal system in calling out both conservatives (for baselessly denying the validity of Donald Trump's conviction) and the media (for allowing said vagaries to fester on their air); Ken Buck discusses Trump's stranglehold on the GOP, and debates with Jon over the "bad precedent" (Buck's term) set by New York's prosecution of Trump.
3906	54	June 4	Ronny Chieng	Marlon Wayans	Good Grief
"InDecision 2024" coverage of Joe Biden's executive order on border security and Donald Trump's promise to declassify secrets… except for Jeffrey Epstein's; Ronny on X officially allowing porn; Desi Lydic on North Korea ballooning its garbage into South Korea; "Project: Conspiracy" ("Kevin Matthew Kelp" claims "spelling bees are the perfect cover for finding the next generation of America's spooks"); Marlon Wayans on processing grief through comedy and riffing on celebrities.
3907	55	June 5	Ronny Chieng	Joel Kim Booster	Outstanding: A Comedy Revolution
"Headlines" (Donald Trump vows revenge, a Black lawmaker praises Jim Crow, and a woman brags over not returning store shopping carts); Troy Iwata on a remote tribe in the Amazon rainforest getting hooked on the internet; "Sports War" (Ronny and Jordan Klepper argue and wager over Caitlin Clark getting shoved, Bronny James entering the NBA draft, and Takeru Kobayashi retiring from competitive eating); Ronny and Joel Kim Booster discuss trailblazing comedians, the meritocracy that is stand-up, and why jokes take precedent over personal opinions.
3908	56	June 6	Ronny Chieng	George Conway	The Atlantic; Society for the Rule of Law Institute
Ronny discusses Joe Biden commemorating D-Day, Donald Trump vetting his "running mate/human shield" list, and conservatives attacking Pride Month; Grace Kuhlenschmidt on Target limiting its sales of LGBT-themed merchandise; an ad for the "Trump Love Flag" ("show the flag just how much it means to you… in the privacy of your own home"); George Conway discusses Trump's legal cases and how to counter the former president in the run-up to November; "Your Moment of Zen" (Fox & Friends dismisses Emmanuel Macron's language "jazzercise" during his D-Day speech).
3909	57	June 10	Jon Stewart	Monica McNutt	ESPN; New York Knicks Radio
After acknowledging Pat Sajak's retirement from Wheel of Fortune ("Have you thought about just doing Mondays?"), Jon calls out corporations for displaying (or toning down) their diversity efforts and Pride Month support when the bottom line is their only commitment; a message from "Corporate America'" promises to forgo diversity and just make cheap, high-priced products; Monica McNutt on her viral argument with Stephen A. Smith, how underlying issues affect discussing women's basketball, and what new fans should know about the WNBA's history and style of play.
3910	58	June 11	Jordan Klepper	Kevin Bacon	Beverly Hills Cop: Axel F MaXXXine
"Headlines" coverage of the guilty verdict against Hunter Biden and a Supreme Court justice's wife griping over Pride flags; Michael Kosta on how diners' opinions led to a postponement of New York's traffic congestion pricing; Troy Iwata reports on humiliation fetishes created from American political polarization; Kevin Bacon on playing villains, working with Eddie Murphy, and how 80s horror films are "thinly-veiled morality tales."
3911	59	June 12	Jordan Klepper	Jeremy O. Harris	Slave Play. Not a Movie. A Play.
Thoughts on champion Joey Chestnut's ban from the Nathan's Hot Dog Eating Contest; Jordan and Desi Lydic on conservatives' conspiratorial claims over the Hunter Biden conviction; "In My Opinion" (Charlamagne tha God argues that Democrats should be more direct in their campaign messaging); Jeremy O. Harris discusses chronicling the production of and reactions to his Slave Play, and how the documentary proves "theatre supremacy."
3912	60	June 13	Jordan Klepper	Maya Hawke	Inside Out 2 Chaos Angel
"InDecision 2024" (Joe Biden attends the G7 summit in Italy, while Donald Trump holds a "J6 reunion" on Capitol Hill and disses the GOP convention's host city); Jordan analyzes the Supreme Court's decision regarding mifepristone access and Southern Baptist's opposition to IVF; Grace Kuhlenschmidt wants more micromanagement of reproductive rights by "a random group of people I've never met"; Maya Hawke discusses tapping into her own feelings to voice Anxiety in Inside Out 2, growing up with performer parents, and the stories behind her Chaos Angel songs "Black Ice" and "Hang In There" (she also performs the latter).
3913	61	June 17	Jon Stewart	Rev. Dr. William Barber II	White Poverty: How Exposing Myths About Race and Class Can Reconstruct American Democracy; Repairers of the Breach; Yale Divinity School
Using as a starting point Donald Trump's insistence that his insult of RNC host Milwaukee was a concern about crime, Jon debunks the right's obsession with crime rates in Democratic-run cities, noting how illegal guns used in big-city crimes come from GOP-led states with lax gun regulations; William Barber discusses how American poverty statistics have long been misrepresented, and why politicians should not overlook poor and low-wage voters.
3914	62	June 18	Ronny Chieng & Desi Lydic	Rosalind Chao	3 Body Problem
"Headlines" (Ronny on why the Boston Celtics will first celebrate their NBA title in Miami); "InDecision 2024: Going Down on the Ballot" examines controversial words and actions from "down-ballot" candidates Royce White (Minnesota U.S Senate), Valentina Gomez (Missouri Secretary of State), and James Judge (Florida U.S. House); Josh Johnson suggests alternative career opportunities for such extreme candidates; 'Quon (Marlon Wayans) grills Nathan Wade, former special prosecutor in the Georgia election racketeering case, in "Choppin' It Up with 'Quon"; Rosalind Chao recalls her texts and accent advice to Ronny, and discusses 3 Body Problem's humane, "we're all in this together" approach to sci-fi.
3915	63	June 20	Ronny Chieng & Desi Lydic	Ebon Moss-Bachrach	The Bear
"Headlines" (Vladimir Putin & Kim Jong-un have a meeting, while climate protesters do some defacing); in analyzing Louisiana's new law requiring the Ten Commandments in school classrooms, Michael Kosta crosses off each Commandment Republicans couldn't handle, leaving only the word "thou" ("putting 'thouself' is the American way"); "Jordan Klepper Fingers the Pulse" of a Donald Trump campaign rally in Racine, Wisconsin; Ebon Moss-Bachrach discusses his Bear character's evolution, his chemistry with the show's cast, and preparing to play The Thing in The Fantastic Four: First Steps.
3916	64	June 24	Michael Kosta	Paul W. Downs	Hacks
"InDecision 2024" coverage of Joe Biden's debate preparation, Donald Trump's lack thereof, and the GOP talking point that Biden will be aided by performance enhancing drugs; Desi Lydic and Troy Iwata have their own debate prep debate; "The Daily Showography" of "Jeff Bezos, History's Most Powerful Nerd"; Paul W. Downs discusses the comedic term "hack" and wearing multiple hats on, and how audiences relate to, Hacks; "Your Moment of Zen" (Trump's "In four years, you don't have to vote" remarks to the Faith and Freedom Coalition).
3917	65	June 25	Michael Kosta	Peter S. Goodman	The New York Times; How the World Ran Out of Everything: Inside the Global Supply Chain
"Headlines" coverage of Julian Assange's plea deal, InfoWars' liquidation, and the Surgeon General's warning that gun violence is a public health crisis; Josh Johnson on how the U.S. can reassert lunar supremacy after a Chinese probe visited the far side of the Moon; "Back in Black" (Lewis Black on fire departments, hospitals, and corporate America expanding into summer camp space); Peter S. Goodman discusses the need for antitrust enforcement and a more resilient supply chain that doesn't solely benefit big-box retailers.
3918	66	June 26	Michael Kosta	Sharon Lerner	ProPublica
Michael remarks on congressional primary results in New York and Colorado, then examines the Supreme Court declaring that tipping a local official is not a bribe, the RIAA suing to protect artists from AI-generated tunes, and the delayed return of the Boeing Starliner; Ronny Chieng would rather stay "embedded" with the ISS crew than watch the Biden-Trump debate; Triumph the Insult Comic Dog talks with undecided voters; Sharon Lerner discusses her ProPublica piece with The New Yorker on 3M's use and concealment of forever chemicals.
3919	67	June 27; Live episode	Jon Stewart	Lori Gottlieb	Maybe You Should Talk to Someone; The Atlantic
InDecision 2024: The First Presidential Debate America Watches Through Its Fingers; A disappointed Jon goes live to analyze this evening's first presidential debate ("We just watched what you watched"), giving angry critiques of Joe Biden's gaffes, Donald Trump's false statements, and the CNN moderators' lack of fact checking; Lori Gottlieb discusses election cycle anxiety and how to deal with fear and anger exacerbated by family members, social media, and news outlets.

=== July ===
No. overall	No. in season	Date	Hosted by	Guest(s)	Promotion
3920	68	July 8	Jon Stewart	A. J. Jacobs	The Year of Living constitutionally
Jon examines Democrats' handwringing about Joe Biden's mental faculties after his presidential debate and spitballs a "stress test" for the Biden candidacy by having other potential Democratic candidates offer up their own presidential bona fides at the convention ("You could call it, oh, I don't know, The Apprentice"); "The Best F#@king News Team" make like various deities to spoof Biden's claim that he would drop out of the presidential race only if "the Lord Almighty" told him to; A. J. Jacobs discusses how the Founding Fathers knew the U. S. Constitution was flawed (grammatical and otherwise), and how he followed the document in its original context (quill pen and otherwise).
3921	69	July 9	Jordan Klepper & Desi Lydic	Aasif Mandvi	Evil
Desi turns a report about Gwyneth Paltrow's crappy (literally) house guest into a metaphor about who should be another "house" guest; a look at Donald Trump's connections to, and his distancing himself from, Project 2025; Michael Kosta gets to the bottom of whether President Biden is being treated for Parkinson's disease; Josh Johnson asks a panel of Black voters about the demographic's increased attraction towards Trump; Aasif Mandvi recalls some of his memorable field pieces for TDS, and discusses Evil's "intersection of comedy and horror."
3922	70	July 10	Jordan Klepper & Desi Lydic	Elizabeth Dias & Lisa Lerer	The New York Times; The Fall of Roe: The Rise of a New America
"InDecision 2024" coverage of Donald Trump's latest rally ramblings, an upcoming "big boy press conference" by Joe Biden, and George Clooney's call for Biden to withdraw from the race; Ronny Chieng reports on a Wisconsin factory project that was far from what Trump and Foxconn promised it'd be; Elizabeth Dias & Lisa Lerer discuss how the decades-long motivation of religious conservatives, and a sense of denial by pro-choice supporters, led to the Dobbs decision that overturned nationwide abortion rights.
3923	71	July 16	Jon Stewart	Bill O'Reilly	Confronting the Presidents
After praising the show's crew for "[turning] this ocean liner around on a dime" back to New York, Jon analyzes Day One of the Republican Convention in Milwaukee, Donald Trump's selection of JD Vance as his running mate, and Joe Biden's pugnacious interview with Lester Holt; Jon honors the man killed in the attempted assassination on Trump while noting the habits Americans have in such moments; Jon and Bill O'Reilly disagree on Biden's impact on the economy, but the guest also offers thoughts on debating in good faith and the danger of monetizing anger and hate.
3924	72	July 17	Ronny Chieng	Scott Galloway	New York University Stern School of Business; The Prof G Show podcast The Algebra of Wealth
"InDecision 2024" coverage of RNC Night Two, with Ronny noting how "civil and polite" was replaced by divisive words; Michael Kosta analyzes why unity messages were ditched at the convention ("It was boring, so they stopped; back to you, Ronny"); Jordan Klepper and Desi Lydic disagree over the selection of JD Vance (and Vance's beard) as the GOP VP pick; Scott Galloway on what can be done, fiscally and politically, to help young people build financial nest eggs.
3925	73	July 18; Live episode	Jordan Klepper	no guests	n/a
InDecision 2024: The Republican National Convention — Donald Trump Fists America; Michael Kosta, Desi Lydic, and Ronny Chieng offer updates on the status of Joe Biden's candidacy; Jordan recaps Donald Trump's acceptance speech, but not before summarizing supporters' belief that "divine intervention" spared Trump, and RNC speeches by Hulk Hogan, "Discount Ulysses S. Grant," and a suspiciously bright-faced Matt Gaetz; Troy Iwata, Josh Johnson, and Grace Kuhlenschmidt play "Would You Rather?" with people who'd rather talk about anything other than the election.
3926	74	July 29	Jon Stewart	Pete Buttigieg	2020 Democratic presidential candidate Former mayor of South Bend, Indiana
Starting with "a short, one-man, black-box play," Jon analyzes Democrats' shift from despair to euphoria over Joe Biden suspending his re-election campaign and endorsing Kamala Harris; Jon's criticism of conservatives' flailing attacks on Harris dovetails into Josh Johnson's rundown of the GOP's Harris critiques (many of which include the word "Black"); Pete Buttigieg on his possibly being vetted as Harris' running mate, why he goes on Fox News, and the need to focus on "a worker-oriented economy"' "Your Moment of Zen" (various GOP figures mispronounce Kamala Harris' first name).
3927	75	July 30	Ronny Chieng	John M. Chu	Viewfinder: A Memoir of Seeing and Being Seen
"InDecision 2024" analysis of the "White Dudes for Harris" drive and Donald Trump's apparent fear of debating Kamala Harris; Ronny examines Democrats' "weird" attack line against Trump and, especially, JD Vance's "childless cat ladies" comment; Grace Kuhlenschmidt says she's "a normal adult woman" in an apartment full of lizards; "Back in Black" (Lewis Black on the record-setting summer heat); John M. Chu on casting Ronny in Crazy Rich Asians, what drew him to direct the film version of Wicked, and his advice to young people seeking the American Dream.
3928	76	July 31	Ronny Chieng	Eric Burton; Black Pumas	Chronicles of a Diamond
"InDecision 2024" (Donald Trump disses Black journalists, and questions Kamala Harris' racial identity, at an NABJ conference, while Megan Thee Stallion declares "Hotties for Harris"); Michael Kosta believes Harris should drop out to keep Democrats' enthusiasm going; Eric Burton discusses developing Black Puma's sound with Adrian Quesada, how their first album influenced their second (from which the band performs "Gemini Sun"), and attending a silent retreat.

=== August ===
No. overall	No. in season	Date	Hosted by	Guest(s)	Promotion
3929	77	August 1	Ronny Chieng	Former U.S. Rep. Adam Kinzinger Hong Chau	Power the Polls Advisory Council; CNN The Instigators
"InDecision 2024" (Donald Trump uses Mindy Kaling's Instagram to question Kamala Harris' Indian heritage, while JD Vance half-heartedly defends his own wife's ethnicity); Ronny examines Harris' running-mate options, with Desi Lydic explaining why it needs to be a white male; Adam Kinzinger on divisiveness within Congress, the need to ensure safe elections for voters and poll workers, and why "old school" Republicans should vote for Harris; Hong Chau tries Ronny's wife's Bánh bò cake and discusses being an introvert in showbiz and the daughter of Vietnamese immigrants.
3930	78	August 5	Michael Kosta	Roxane Gay	Stand Your Ground: A Black Feminist Reckoning with America’s Gun Problem
"Headlines" coverage of the Paris Olympics, in particular conservatives claiming (incorrectly) that Algerian female boxer Imane Khelif is a male; Michael analyzes RFK Jr's confession he dropped a bear cub carcass in Central Park in 2014, while Desi Lydic lists other strange stories the presidential candidate is fessing up to; Roxane Gay on what attracts her and other people of color to gun ownership, how the Second Amendment favors straight white males, and why she's excited about Kamala Harris' presidential bid.
3931	79	August 6	Michael Kosta	Ed Helms	SNAFU: MEDBURG
Michael analyzes the “Midwestern dad as f–k” vibe of Tim Walz, Kamala Harris' running mate, while Josh Johnson says Walz is "the right type of white guy"; "Jordan Klepper Fingers the Pulse" of Donald Trump supporters in Harrisburg, PA, including the loss of "their favorite punching bag" and conspiratorial theories about the attempted assassination on Trump; Ed Helms discusses a 1971 burglary at an FBI office (the subject of his podcast), what he learned about creating comedy at TDS, and how a show billboard helped Rob Corddry get into a GOP convention.
3932	80	August 7	Michael Kosta	Barbara McQuade	University of Michigan Law School; Attack From Within: How Disinformation is Sabotaging America
"InDecision 2024" examines the GOP calling Tim Walz "Tampon Tim" (for Minnesota's tampons-in-school-bathrooms program) and a "secret communist"; Troy Iwata outs other communists, from insurance company mascots to "Commie-dy Central"; "In My Opinion" (Charlamagne Tha God refutes conservatives' "DEI hire" claims against Kamala Harris); Barbara McQuade on what can be done to counter the far right's use of nostalgia, declinism, and deliberate lies during the election cycle.
3933	81	August 8	Michael Kosta	Hannah Berner	We Ride at Dawn
"InDecision 2024" (Donald Trump compares his crowd sizes to those of the MLK-led March on Washington); "Headlines" spotlights Joe Biden's latest interview gaffe, two Boeing astronauts' extended space stay, and Elon Musk's lawsuit against X advertisers; an "advanced copy" of X Corp. CEO Linda Yaccarino's next message to the platform's users; Grace Kuhlenschmidt interviews "Kamala-maniacs" at the first Harris/Tim Walz rally; Hannah Berner on comparing bachelorette parties to cults and being more kind to herself in stand-up comedy than she was in collegiate tennis; "Your Moment of Zen" (Laura Ingraham's lament on how Minnesota has changed under Walz — "especially Milwaukee").
3934	82	August 12	Jon Stewart	Mark Cuban	Cost Plus Drugs
Returning from COVID ("First-timer, did not care for it"), Jon examines Donald Trump's hard time adjusting to Kamala Harris' rising poll numbers, and posits that Trump's use of the same "boilerplate" critiques on Harris that he previously applied to Joe Biden means that Trump desires to see Biden return to the race; Mark Cuban discusses Silicon Valley's love of Trump, the future of AI, and how transparent drug pricing benefits the healthcare system.
3935	83	August 13	Desi Lydic	Gabrielle Thomas	United States Olympic team
"InDecision 2024" coverage of "Sylvester Trump's" word-slurring interview with Elon Musk on X; Trump's claim he engaged in a "No Way!"/"Way!" verbal standdown with Vladimir Putin inspires an extended spoof of other 90s catchphrases between Trump and Musk; "Sports War" (Ronny Chieng and Michael Kosta argue over the Paris Olympics' highlights and lowlights); Gabby Thomas discusses physically & mentally training for Olympic gold and advocating for equal access to healthcare through her volunteer work.
3936	84	August 14	Desi Lydic	Mark Duplass	The Morning Show
"InDecision 2024" (Desi dissects leaked Project 2025 training videos and exclusively unveils one video "made for one particular government employee"); Grace Kuhlenschmidt examines the drawbacks of gerontocracy; Mark Duplass on his Morning Show character's evolution, producing indie film/TV projects, and being honest about his mental health.
3937	85	August 15	Desi Lydic	Brittney Cooper; Rebecca Traister	Rutgers University & Eloquent Rage; New York/The Cut & Good and Mad
"InDecision 2024" examines Donald Trump's rants against Joe Biden's and Kamala Harris' peculiarities (and Tic-Tacs) during an "intellectual" speech on economic policy; Troy Iwata insists different product sizes are bad signs of inflation; "The Daily Showography" spotlights JD Vance's transformations from hillbilly kid into venture capitalist, and from a "never Trumper" into Trump's running mate; Rebecca Traister & Brittney Cooper discuss channeling election emotions into action.
3938	86	August 19 from Chicago	Michael Kosta	Michigan Governor Gretchen Whitmer	True Gretch: What I've Learned About Life, Leadership, and Everything in Between
InDecision 2024: The Democratic National Convention — Plot Twist; Michael discusses Democrats' vague nightly themes and confirmed & rumored celebrity appearances at the DNC; Michael and Grace Kuhlenschmidt on Chicago street teams promoting women's reproductive rights; Jordan Klepper teaches Tim Walz about regional pandering, then goes on a Windy City pub crawl with Illinois Governor J. B. Pritzker; Gretchen Whitmer discusses her serving as the Harris/Walz campaign's co-chair and how taking on Donald Trump earned her the nickname "Big Gretch."
3939	87	August 20 from Chicago	Desi Lydic	U.S. Representative Lauren Underwood of Illinois	Black Maternal Health Caucus
InDecision 2024: The Democratic National Convention — Plot Twist; In between teases of James Taylor performing on the show (a running joke mirroring Taylor being bumped from DNC Night One), Desi reviews Joe Biden's late late show, chants of "lock him up!" during Hillary Clinton's speech, and other highlights from the opening night; Troy Iwata hunts for the perfect "thank you" card for Biden; "The Best F#@king News Team" gauges attendees' thoughts on the convention's vibe; Lauren Underwood discusses her Night One speech, working with Kamala Harris on maternal healthcare legislation, and combating conservatives' anti-woman agenda.
3940	88	August 21 from Chicago	Jordan Klepper	Maryland Governor Wes Moore	n/a
InDecision 2024: The Democratic National Convention — Plot Twist; Jordan recaps DNC Night Two, including a jazzed-up state roll call and Michelle & Barack Obama going low (at Donald Trump) while going high (oratorically); Desi Lydic has glowing comment ideas for Illinois' roll call, while Ronny Chieng reveals further insults Democrats have for Trump; Grace Kuhlenschmidt tries everything to gain an audience with Tim Walz; Wes Moore on Maryland "having the right kind of partner in Washington" and the right's and left's differing interpretations of patriotism.
3941	89	August 22 live episode from Chicago	Jon Stewart	no guests	n/a
InDecision 2024: The Democratic National Convention — Plot Twist; Jon analyzes Kamala Harris' acceptance speech, the DNC's displays of joy and diversity, and the contradictions in Fox News' convention coverage; "The Best F#@king News Team" offer their thoughts on Democrats' embrace of "small town values"; Jason Bateman narrates the story of Harris' life and how her potential presidency would be "just normal."

=== September ===
No. overall	No. in season	Date	Hosted by	Guest(s)	Promotion
3942	90	September 9	Jordan Klepper	Yuval Noah Harari	Nexus: A Brief History of Information Networks From the Stone Age to AI
"InDecision 2024" coverage of Dick Cheney's endorsement of Kamala Harris, Donald Trump's false claim of "sex change operations" in public schools, and Harris/Trump debate preparations; Grace Kuhlenschmidt does a Trump-like verbal "weave"; "The People Behind the People" profiles "Susan Callipenni-McIntyre," the campaign worker obsessively sending fundraising e-mails; Yuval Noah Harari discusses "AI bureaucrats" and the need to go on "an information diet."
3943	91	September 10 live episode	Jon Stewart	Steve Ballmer	USAFacts
InDecision 2024: The First Presidential Debate, Again! (Now with 50 Percent Less Old Man!); After giving Dick Cheney a "f**k off!" at "Camera 1" (even though Cheney endorsed Kamala Harris), Jon breaks down this evening's Harris/Trump debate ("Holy s**t, [Harris] crushed it!") and what it may or may not mean going forward, then gets serious about Donald Trump deflecting responsibility for January 6; Steve Ballmer discusses the need to understand government finances, as well as the relationship between capitalism and democracy; "Your Moment of Zen" (Trump's "I have concepts of a plan" comment when challenged if he has an ACA replacement at the debate).
3944	92	September 11	Jordan Klepper	John Heilemann	Puck; Impolitic with John Heilemann podcast NBC News & MSNBC
"InDecision 2024" covers Donald Trump's insistence that he won the debate with Kamala Harris and his dissing Taylor Swift for endorsing Harris; an "undercover" Ronny Chieng finds nothing about the Trump-amplified claim of immigrants eating pets in Ohio; Michael Kosta investigates "courtesy towing" in Philadelphia; over Philly cheesesteaks and rye whiskey, Jordan and John Heilemann discuss Harris' debate win, whether the debate swayed undecided voters, and Heilemann's experience in the debate's media spin room.
3945	93	September 12	Jordan Klepper	Sasheer Zamata	Agatha All Along
"InDecision 2024" examines Marjorie Taylor Greene's gripe over a "9/11 truther" in Donald Trump's inner circle, the right's aloofness over Taylor Swift's Kamala Harris endorsement, and Joe Biden's befriending a MAGAist; Jordan and Michael Kosta exchange hats in a sign of "unity"; "In My Opinion" (John Leguizamo hears dog whistles in GOP efforts to suppress the Latino vote); Sasheer Zamata discusses researching witches and singing in a Broadway legend's presence, and drafts her all-star "coven."
3946	94	September 17	Ronny Chieng	Luis Elizondo	Imminent: Inside the Pentagon's Hunt for UFOs
Ronny analyzes a shooting incident at Donald Trump's golf club and dubious attempts by Trump and JD Vance to blame violent rhetoric on the left; a "very real" post-incident recording of Joe Biden's call to Trump; Ronny and a "hearty whaler" on RFK Jr. reportedly decapitating a dead whale; Luis Elizondo discusses the reality of unidentified aerial phenomenon and intelligent alien life.
3947	95	September 18	Ronny Chieng	Daniel Dae Kim	Yellow Face
Ronny dissects the Federal Reserve's interest rate cut and a Donald Trump-backed cryptocurrency business, with an ad explaining how the latter works ("Trump's name is on it, so you buy it, okay?"); Josh Johnson hits the gym to ask men who they want to see in a presidential candidate endorser; Daniel Dae Kim discusses Yellow Face's continued relevance and the importance of Asian performers portraying Asian characters.
3948	96	September 19	Ronny Chieng	Phillip Lim	3.1 Phillip Lim
"InDecision 2024" examines disturbing comments by Rudy Giuliani (at a Donald Trump rally in "the Florida of New York") and a North Carolina gubernatorial candidate (allegedly, on a porn site); Troy Iwata gets the scoop straight from the cat at the center of a pet-eating hoax in Ohio; "Back in Black" (Lewis Black cringes over political campaign partnerships with social media influencers); Phillip Lim on forging his path as a fashion designer and the values he learned from his immigrant parents.
3949	97	September 23	Jon Stewart	Christine Lagarde	European Central Bank
Jon examines the escalating conflict engulfing "The Futile Crescent," the Biden administration's inability to prevent war from widening, and the criticism the Netanyahu government faces within Israel; Christine Lagarde discusses the dramatic effects of inflation and interest rates on the average person, as well as the need for global governance of AI; "Your Moment of Zen" (Donald Trump's "it's too late" dismissal of a second debate with Kamala Harris).
3950	98	September 24	Desi Lydic	Aubrey Plaza	Megaopolis; My Old Ass; Agatha All Along
"InDecision 2024 for Her" examines Donald Trump's and Bernie Moreno's insulting appeals to female voters, as well as Mark Robinson's desire to make his porn scandal reach climax; Dulcé Sloan makes Josh Johnson answer for Robinson and every man; an attack ad-style "Daily Showography" ("sponsored by Trump/Vance and Project 2025") connects Tim Walz's "radically nice" behavior to his early teaching career in China; Aubrey Plaza on channeling Fox News for her Megaopolis character, wanting to meet her 75-year-old self, and her own "dream coven."
3951	99	September 25	Desi Lydic	Raye	Live at Montreux Jazz Festival
"InDecision 2024" looks at Donald Trump's claims that Kamala Harris never worked at McDonald's in her youth (and, as Desi puts it, his demanding to see Harris' "burger certificate"); the latest Trump side hustle inspires an ad for "Trump Spunk" (with each vial "hand-cranked" by Trump himself); Raye performs "Genesis" after discussing her year in music and the healing power of songwriting.
3952	100	September 26	Desi Lydic	Susanna Fogel	Winner
"Suspects and the City" examines the bribery-and-corruption indictment against New York City mayor Eric Adams; Michael Kosta figures he's all that's left to run the Big Apple (in light of others in Adams' orbit resigning or also facing investigations); "In My Opinion" (Leslie Jones on why Europeans think Americans are so messed up); Susanna Fogel discusses the challenges of dramatizing Reality Winner's story through a female lens.
3953	101	September 30	Jon Stewart	Ta-Nehisi Coates	The Message
Contrasting what Donald Trump's supporters see and claim, Jon highlights Trump's lack of policy specificity, anti-labor ethos, and consistent fearmongering; Ta-Nehisi Coates discusses how oppression in the past shapes oppression in the present, and the hidden stories of marginalized communities in the U.S. and beyond.

=== October ===
No. overall	No. in season	Date	Hosted by	Guest(s)	Promotion
3954	102	October 1 Live episode	Michael Kosta	Paola Ramos	Defectors: The Rise of the Latino Far Right and What It Means for America
InDecision 2024 — The Vice Presidential Debate: The Battle to be America's Number One Number Two; Michael breaks down the hits and missteps from the vice-presidential debate; Troy Iwata, Josh Johnson, and Grace Kuhlenschmidt hit the streets to gauge voter enthusiasm; Paola Ramos discusses the shifting political leanings of Latino voters and how JD Vance's controversial immigration comments resonate in this context.
3955	103	October 2	Michael Kosta	Jelani Cobb	Columbia University Graduate School of Journalism
"InDecision 2024" (Michael examines the post-VP debate spin); Triumph the Insult Comic Dog crashes the post-debate spin room; Jelani Cobb discusses the history of the Electoral College and the importance of diverse and trustworthy journalism.
3956	104	October 3	Michael Kosta	JJ Johnson	FieldTrip; The Simple Art of Rice
Michael analyzes a court decision allowing wagering on U.S. congressional races, and the political and economic effects of the longshoremen's strike; Grace Kuhlenschmidt on strike-influenced panic buying (and Michael's toilet paper use); "In My Opinion" (Charlamagne Tha God suspects that Donald Trump might want to steal the election); JJ Johnson on the cultural significance of and disrespect toward rice, and teaching healthy cooking to younger generations.
3957	105	October 7	Jon Stewart	Bill Adair	Beyond the Big Lie; Knight Professor of the Practice of Journalism and Public Policy at Duke University
Jon analyzes the GOP's belief that war and hurricanes boost their election chances, then breaks down Elon Musk's allyship with Donald Trump and their accusations of election interference (unless it's someone on their side, then it's "free speech"); Bill Adair on deciphering political speech, the government's role in combatting misinformation & disinformation, and how PolitiFact (the site he co-founded) answers people's curiosities; "Your Moment of Zen" (Trump swats at a fly while giving a speech).
3958	106	October 8	Jordan Klepper	Jason Reynolds	Twenty-Four Seconds From Now…
Jordan unpacks disproven political claims surrounding post-Hurricane Helene recovery efforts, then speaks with a North Carolina "first responder" about fake hurricane rescue images; Michael Kosta interviews Marlene Bourne about her peculiar connection to Fox News' settlement with Dominion Voting Systems; Jason Reynolds on the importance of representing teens in literature; "Your Moment of Zen" (a giant naked statue of Donald Trump hits Phoenix).
3959	107	October 9	Jordan Klepper	Jessica Valenti	Abortion: Our Bodies, Their Lies, and the Truths We Use to Win
"InDecision 2024" examines Kamala Harris' media tour, Melania Trump's book revelations, Stephen Miller's "sexual matador" persona, and Project 2025's plan to ban pornography; "Sports War" (Jordan and Ronny Chieng clash over Aaron Rodgers' influence on the New York Jets, Vanderbilt fans' post-upset antics, and the legacy of Pete Rose); Jessica Valenti discusses the post-Dobbs landscape ahead of Election Day.
3960	108	October 10	Jordan Klepper	Eric Idle	The Spamalot Diaries
"InDecision 2024" looks at Donald Trump's denial of a Joe Biden-led economic recovery; Jordan and Troy Iwata on conservatives' claims that real men don't vote Democrat; "In My Opinion" (Ricky Velez on the implication that Trump will pardon himself and his allies should he win the presidency); Eric Idle on bringing Spamalot to Broadway and looking on the bright side of life; "Your Moment of Zen" (Biden's "get a life, man" admonishment at Trump's hurricane relief lies).
3961	109	October 15	Desi Lydic	Stacey Abrams	Stacey Speaks Up; Assembly Required podcast
"InDecision 2024" examines Kamala Harris releasing her medical records, Donald Trump not releasing his, and Trump turning a town hall into "a one-man dance party"; Michael Kosta (in the "Daily Show Election Center") on where Trump's behavior falls on "the scary-to-funny ratio"; Lewis Black has a harsh message for undecided voters in "Back in Black"; Stacey Abrams on Georgia's ballot-count requirements, what can be done to combat voter suppression, and teaching children advocacy & empathy.
3962	110	October 16	Desi Lydic	Jason Segel	Shrinking
Demographics is the focus of "InDecision 2024," including "Darth Trump" claiming he's "the father of IVF" to a room full of GOP women and Kamala Harris' campaign offering ideas for Black men (while Barack Obama offers them a scolding); Desi and Josh Johnson brainstorm alternative pitches for each others' demographic (while Troy Iwata does the same for "the rural football dads"); Troy speaks to another demographic — juggalos (and Insane Clown Posse member Violent J) — about where they stand politically; Jason Segel offers life advice to the TDS staff.
3963	111	October 17	Desi Lydic	Kara Swisher	Burn Book: A Tech Love Story
"InDecision 2024" breaks down Kamala Harris' Fox News interview and Donald Trump's Univision town hall; Grace Kuhlenschmidt takes "going into the lions' den" literally; in a Spirit Day edition of "In My Opinion," Laverne Cox discusses conservatives' weaponization of transphobia and its effects; Kara Swisher on her life as a tech journalist and Elon Musk's alliance with Trump; "Your Moment of Zen" (Trump's "all I do is report" claim regarding his echoing the Springfield pet-eating hoax).
3964	112	October 21	Jon Stewart	Minnesota Governor Tim Walz	2024 Vice Presidential campaign
Jon covers the campaign's "fever dream portion" — Kamala Harris syncing with Liz Cheney, Donald Trump working at McDonald's and marveling about "Arnold's palmer" — before getting serious about Trump branding specific Democratic figures as "enemies from within" and the GOP's downplaying of the rhetoric; Tim Walz discusses the Democrats' campaign strategy, appealing to voters looking for an alternative to Trump, and his personal experiences while campaigning; "Your Moment of Zen" (Trump pauses a campaign speech to "recomb" his hair).
3965	113	October 22	Michael Kosta	Secretary Jennifer Granholm	United States Department of Energy
A look Rudy Giuliani being ordered to surrender his assets to two Georgia election workers he defamed; "InDecision 2024" (Michael examines Elon Musk's $1 million vote bribe and his support of Donald Trump's campaign, while Ronny Chieng says Musk is only doing it to make a friend); Michael learns about the National Popular Vote Interstate Compact (with a little help from CNN's John King and his touchscreen); Jennifer Granholm on the growth of clean energy & electronic vehicles; "Your Moment of Zen" (Sara Sidner shows how she'd say goodbye at the airport by walking off the CNN News Central set).
3966	114	October 23	Michael Kosta	David Hogg	Leaders We Deserve
"InDecision 2024" unpacks Barack Obama & Eminem stanning for Kamala Harris, Tim Walz not stanning for Donald Trump & Elon Musk, and Trump (according to his former Chief of Staff) really stanning for Hitler & fascism; History Channel's "new lineup of World War II programming" emphasizes how Hitler and his generals were bad; Michael heads to Lansing to see if fellow Michiganders want to bid the electoral college adieu; David Hogg offers advice for Harris and discusses electing young progressives, Gen-Z's civic involvement, and remaining optimistic after the Parkland high school shooting.
3967	115	October 24	Michael Kosta	Fat Joe	Fat Joe Talks
"InDecision 2024" finds Michael covering Beyoncé's endorsement of Kamala Harris and Tucker Carlson's fantasy of "daddy" Donald Trump spanking "unruly teenage girl" America ("Everything okay at home, Tuck?"); a look at how the campaign has led to lawn sign vandalism and increased collective anxiety; an ad promotes holes in empty fields (literally) as the perfect place to escape from the campaign; Ronny Chieng surveys Magic: The Gathering players about JD Vance's nerdy side; Fat Joe discusses his weight loss journey and his push for healthcare price transparency, and wonders if voters are "man enough" to vote for a woman.
3968	116	October 28	Jon Stewart	Pennsylvania Governor Josh Shapiro	n/a
Jon analyzes Donald Trump's xenophobic Madison Square Garden rally and his mass deportation proposal; TDS alum Jessica Williams offers Jon and viewers words of encouragement ("Don’t let the constant, draining [expletive] wear you out"); Josh Shapiro discusses Pennsylvania's swing-state status, why he believes Democrats' inclusive strategy will win over voters, and his approach to cutting red tape and rebuilding infrastructure.
Special	Special	October 28	Jordan Klepper	n/a	n/a
The Daily Show Presents: Jordan Klepper Fingers the Pulse — Rally Together; Jordan brings along playwright Jeremy O. Harris, podcast hosts Corinne Fisher & Krystyna Hutchinson, and actor Thomas Lennon (reprising his Lt. Dangle character from Reno 911) to Donald Trump campaign appearances to analyze the candidate's allure and his rallies' energy levels; Jordan also shows frequent "Fingers the Pulse" interviewee "MAGA Edward" what a Kamala Harris campaign event is really like.
3969	117	October 29	Ronny Chieng	Maria Teresa Kumar	Voto Latino
"InDecision 2024" (Ronny unpacks the continued fallout from racist jokes at the "MAGA Square Garden" rally as well as Donald Trump insisting he's "the opposite of a Nazi"); inspired by an RFK, Jr. comment, Grace Kuhlenschmidt travels back to 1946 and kidnaps "Baby Trump" (which changes Troy Iwata's history); Triumph the Insult Comic Dog crashes Trump's MSG rally; Maria Teresa Kumar discusses the power and mobilization of the Latino vote.
3970	118	October 30	Ronny Chieng	The Linda Lindas (Lucia de la Garza, Mila de la Garza, Bela Salazar, Eloise Wong)	No Obligation
"InDecision 2024" covers the "garbage" fight between Joe Biden & conservatives and how Donald Trump may let RFK, Jr. "go wild" on public health matters; Jordan Klepper schools Ronny on why the media covers political gaffes more than policy issues; "The People Behind the People" profiles JD Vance's "likeability coach," "Nathaniel Gordon"; The Linda Lindas discuss promoting social change, finding success at a young age, and gaining confidence while writing their second album (from which they also perform the title track).
3971	119	October 31	Ronny Chieng	Connie Chung	Connie
"InDecision 2024" examines Donald Trump's garbage worker cosplay, his "whether women like it or not" remark, and Kamala Harris supporters seeking the women's vote in the most private of places; a parody of "no one will know your vote" ads; John Leguizamo goes undercover to gauge the thoughts of undecided but "Trump-curious" Latino voters; Connie Chung discusses her barrier-breaking career, her desire to see investigative journalism make a comeback, and her first-ever endorsement of a candidate for office (Harris).

=== November ===
No. overall	No. in season	Date	Hosted by	Guest(s)	Promotion
3972	120	November 4	Jordan Klepper	Adam Serwer	The Atlantic; The Cruelty Is the Point: The Past, Present, and Future of Trump's America
"InDecision 2024" covers the final push to "Tilda Swinton's birthday," including Kamala Harris' star-studded send-off and Donald Trump's intimate moment with a mic stand; Jordan on Robert F. Kennedy, Jr.'s desire to remove fluoride from drinking water and the MAGA-mourned death of Peanut the squirrel; Michael Kosta insists Trump is the "sheriff of 'Sane Diego'"; Grace Kuhlenschmidt dives into the world of election prognostication; Adam Serwer on Republican-led "snitch states" and the far-right culture of cruelty, blame, and conspiracies; "Your Moment of Zen" (local TV anchors celebrate "Election Eve").
3973	121	November 5 Live episode	Jon Stewart	Arizona Governor Katie Hobbs Michigan Lieutenant Governor Garlin Gilchrist II	n/a
The Daily Show Presents a Live Election Night Special With Jon Stewart: InDecision 2024 — Nothing We Can Do About It Now "The Best F#@king News Team" covers the Election Night returns; Jon and his guests analyze the results and what they mean going forward; Jon closes with a few harsh words for political pollsters and advice for his audience: "This is not the end."
3974	122	November 6	Desi Lydic	Tressie McMillan Cottom	UNC School of Information and Library Science; The New York Times
“I slept two hours last night and I feel like [expletive]. Let’s do this!” So says Desi as she and "The Best F#@king News Team" try to look for silver linings in "InDecision 2024: Decision Edition" and the media's rush to assign blame; Grace Kuhlenschmidt speaks with those who practice political abstinence by not voting; Tressie McMillan Cottom analyzes Election Night's deeper implications, Donald Trump's use of identity politics & Americans' anxieties, and how Democrats can reconnect with voters; "Your Moment of Zen" (a young male voter fibs about his girlfriend breaking up with him if he didn't vote for Kamala Harris).
3975	123	November 7	Ronny Chieng	Emily Ngo	Politico
"InDecision 2024" finds Ronny surveying the normal and unusual names being suggested for the Trump cabinet and the Biden administration’s preparations for a peaceful transfer of power; "exclusive audio" of Biden's congratulatory call to Trump reveals the latter feels "being president is a terrible price I have to pay for being so good at racism"; a scientist (Troy Iwata) shows how "a super-advanced, self-sustaining spaceship" may (or may not) save humanity from a warming climate; Emily Ngo discusses her experiences covering Trump's campaign and the challenges of earning public trust in political journalism.
3976	124	November 11	Jon Stewart	Former USMC Sgt. Thomas J. Brennan	The War Horse News
Jon dissects how the election went wrong for Democrats and why finger-pointing pundits miss the mark; Thomas Brennan discusses sharing his & his unit's intense memories of fighting in Fallujah, struggling with survivor's guilt, and focusing on the human impact of military service.
3977	125	November 12	Jordan Klepper	Robert D. Putnam	Join or Die
"Trump 2.0: Coming for the White House" finds Jordan assessing Donald Trump's new cabinet nominees; Michael Kosta teaches Jordan how to buy male friends (just as Elon Musk bought Trump); "Sports War" finds Jordan and Desi Lydic arguing over actual wagers (Missouri's approval of legal sports betting, odds that Aaron Rodgers will win the presidency in 2028) and the New York City Marathon's influencer scandal; Harvard University professor Robert Putnam on how social bonding in the American community can save American democracy.
3978	126	November 13	Jordan Klepper	Belize Leader of the Opposition Moses "Shyne" Barrow	The Honorable Shyne
Jordan on Joe Biden's cordial White House meeting with Donald Trump and the latter's latest cabinet nominations (in particular "Fox & Friends weekend understudy" Pete Hegseth for Defense secretary) in "Trump 2.0: Coming for the White House"; Troy Iwata worries he'll be nominated to Trump's cabinet just because he's on TV; Dulcé Sloan starts a time capsule to preserve America's cultural treasures (before America collapses) in "Dulcé Backs That Thing Up"; Shyne discusses his journey of resilience & faith, and his "seamless transition" from hip-hop to Belizean politics.
3979	127	November 14	Jordan Klepper	Francis Ford Coppola	Megalopolis
"Trump 2.0: Coming for the White House" reviews GOP Senators sidestepping the issue of Matt Gaetz's AG nomination; Desi Lydic reveals the Democrats' response strategy to Gaetz and other Donald Trump nominees ("F**k around and find out"); "In My Opinion" (a cautiously optimistic Charlamagne Tha God pleads for Trump to "leave the Constitution in one piece"); Francis Ford Coppola discusses Megalopolis' themes of risk and freedom, and his enduring optimism for humanity’s future; "Your Moment of Zen" (commentators apply dark pop culture comparisons to Trump's cabinet).
3980	128	November 18	Jon Stewart	Ruy Teixeira	American Enterprise Institute; The Liberal Patriot; Where Have All the Democrats Gone?
Jon criticizes Democrats' "Audacity of Cope" approach to playing by the rules while the GOP exploits loopholes to gain political advantages; Jon and Ruy Teixeira discuss how Democrats lost its working-class base, whether cultural politics alienates voters, and why neither major party seems willing to build a coalition.
3981	129	November 19	Desi Lydic	Ronan Farrow	The New Yorker; Surveilled
"Trump 2.0: Coming for the White House" examines the salacious allegations enveloping Attorney General nominee Matt Gaetz; Ronny Chieng, Josh Johnson, and Grace Kuhlenschmidt are nervous about what a House Ethics Committee report on Gaetz may reveal about their own activities; "Kosta Doin' Business" (Michael Kosta examines industries that will or won't profit from the second presidency of Donald Trump); Ronan Farrow on the dangers of unregulated spyware technology and the importance of protecting journalism and free expression.
3982	130	November 20	Desi Lydic	Joey McIntyre	Jingle Bell Love
Desi examines the latest TV stars joining Donald Trump's cabinet in "Trump 2.0: Coming for the White House"; an "orientation video" for Trump's cabinet selections; Troy Iwata investigates the impact of Trump’s “no tax on tips” policy; Joey McIntyre discusses his recent projects and how friendship has been the key to New Kids on the Block's longevity, and also autographs Desi's New Kids pillow.
3983	131	November 21	Desi Lydic	Brittany Howard	What Now
"Headlines" coverage of Matt Gaetz "withdrawing too soon" and Nancy Mace targeting a trans congresswoman-elect with a bathroom bill; "Project: Conspiracy" ("Kevin Matthew Kelp" investigates the "fowl play" power of Thanksgiving turkeys); Brittany Howard discusses the self-reflection & curiosity behind her music, recalls performing onstage with Prince, and ends the show with a performance of "To Be Still."

=== December ===
No. overall	No. in season	Date	Hosted by	Guest(s)	Promotion
3984	132	December 2	Jon Stewart	Sally Yates	Former United States Deputy Attorney General
Jon unpacks Donald Trump's nomination of Kash Patel to lead the FBI, Joe Biden's pardon of his son, and Democrats' inability to hold the high ground while Republicans keep going low; Sally Yates discusses Trump's vision of the DOJ as his "own personal goon squad," and why the promise of equal justice in America has never been completely fulfilled.
3985	133	December 3	Ronny Chieng	Neil deGrasse Tyson	Merlin's Tour of the Universe
Ronny remarks on South Korea's hours-long martial law period ("Good old Asian efficiency"); "Trump 2.0: Coming for the White House" (Ronny and Troy Iwata on misbehavior reports surrounding Defense secretary nominee Pete Hegseth); "Sports War" (Ronny and Jordan Klepper argue over the Michigan/Ohio State brawl, the Trump dance, and the Hallmark Channel/NFL collaboration); Neil deGrasse Tyson on applying 21st-century answers to old science questions, and the resilience of, and immigrants' contributions to, America's scientific community.
3986	134	December 4	Ronny Chieng	Tom Colicchio	Crafted Hospitality; Why I Cook
"Trump 2.0: Coming for the White House" covers Pete Hegseth's alleged on-the-job inebriation at Fox News and his mother flip-flopping to his defense; Josh Johnson thinks Ronny's more qualified than him to talk about South Korean martial law "because it's a Korea story and you're, uh, from around there"; "Back in Black" (Lewis Black on how progressives are channeling their post-election anxiety); Tom Colicchio on the changing restaurant kitchen culture and reforming nutritional food access; "Your Moment of Zen" (a pre-nomination Hegseth mocks Gen-Z job applicants who bring parents to interviews).
3987	135	December 5	Ronny Chieng	Charles Yu	Interior Chinatown
"Headlines" examines the Biden administration considering preemptive pardons against Donald Trump's critics and leads into the killing of UnitedHealthcare's CEO; Grace Kuhlenschmidt on a stowaway passenger aboard a New York-to-Paris flight; Michael Kosta investigates the impact of book bans in Florida's schools; Charles Yu discusses adopting Interior Chinatown into a TV series (in which Ronny has a role) and breaking stereotypes as an Asian American storyteller; "Your Moment of Zen" (coverage of a sex orgy inside a VA facility in Tennessee).
3988	136	December 9	Jon Stewart	Ben Wikler	Democratic Party of Wisconsin; Candidate for chair of the Democratic National Committee
An upbeat Jon analyzes the fall of Syria's Assad regime and the questionable past of the Syrian rebel group's leader, as well as Donald Trump turning a photo op with Jill Biden at Notre-Dame de Paris into a plug for his new cologne; Ben Wikler discusses leading Wisconsin's Democrats through state GOP gerrymandering, and how the party can evolve and win over the working class nationally.
3989	137	December 10	Michael Kosta	Secretary Deb Haaland	United States Department of Interior
Michael and Ronny Chieng unpack the background of, and the obsession over, the suspect in the killing of UnitedHealthcare CEO Brian Thompson; "Who Won It Best!" (Troy Iwata & Desi Lydic recap Fox Nation's Patriot Awards); Deb Haaland discusses preserving America's public lands & cultural heritage, her parting gift to Joe Biden, and her department's receiving a new administration; "Your Moment of Zen" (a man with a leaf blower intentionally interrupts a live report at the Thompson murder suspect's former school).
3990	138	December 11	Michael Kosta	T. J. English	The Last Kilo
"Headlines" (the "surprisingly modest" manifesto from the UnitedHealthcare CEO's alleged killer); "Trump 2.0: Coming for the White House" (Donald Trump's appointment of "the screaming lady" to be ambassador to Greece and GOP senators' sympathy toward Defense Secretary nominee Pete Hegseth); an ad for "Five Star Recovery" allows patients to lead the Pentagon after admitting their drinking problem; Grace Kuhlenschmidt asks New Yorkers who they think Joe Biden should pardon next; T.J. English on the rise and fall of Willy Falcon's cocaine trafficking empire and seeing organized crime as “the main vein of American culture.”
3991	139	December 12	Michael Kosta	Peter Sarsgaard	September 5
Michael covers the "unenthuastic reveal" of Donald Trump as Time's "Person of the Year" and conspiracy theories surrounding drone sightings in New Jersey; Troy Iwata contends it was Santa Claus who sent the drones; a trailer for "A Very 2024 Christmas" finds its heroine (Desi Lydic) not in a festive, searching-for-true-love mood; Peter Sarsgaard discusses dramatizing ABC Sports' coverage of the Munich massacre.
