= List of The Daily Show episodes (2023) =

- No. of episodes: 87

Release
- Original network: Comedy Central
- Original release: January 17 – December 14, 2023

Season chronology
- ← Previous; 2022 episodes Next → 2024 episodes

This is a list of episodes for The Daily Show, a late-night talk and satirical news television program airing on Comedy Central, during 2023. This was the first year since the departure of host Trevor Noah, who took his leave from the show after 7 years on December 8, 2022.

With no successor for Noah in place, Comedy Central indicated in December 2022 that a series of guests hosts will fill the anchor chair, each sitting in for a one-week assignment, until a permanent host(s) takes over. Leslie Jones would be the first guest host the week of January 17–19, with Wanda Sykes, D. L. Hughley, Chelsea Handler, and Sarah Silverman confirmed for subsequent weeks. Al Franken, John Leguizamo, Marlon Wayans, Kal Penn, and Hasan Minhaj would also serve as guest hosts in February and March. In April, Daily Show correspondents Roy Wood, Jr., Jordan Klepper, and Desi Lydic would have their own turns as hosts.

The Daily Show's guest setup was scheduled to continue into at least June, but after Dulcé Sloan's first night as guest host on May 1, the 2023 Writers Guild of America strike prompted the show to go dark. After the strike ended on September 27, Comedy Central announced that The Daily Show would return on October 16, with correspondent Michael Kosta hosting the first week back. Subsequent hosts through the end of 2023 included Sarah Silverman, Leslie Jones, and Kal Penn, who each had turns as hosts earlier in the year; first-time hosts Desus Nice, Michelle Wolf, and Charlamagne tha God, who had scheduled guest turns in the spring that were scuttled due to the strike; and a "News Team Takeover" that saw the show's correspondents split host duties during the week of Thanksgiving. The network has indicated plans for a permanent new host to take over the anchor desk in 2024.

== 2023 episodes ==
=== January ===
No.	Date	Hosted by	Guest(s)	Promotion
3766	January 17	Leslie Jones	Morris Chestnut	The Best Man: The Final Chapters
Leslie on classified documents found at Joe Biden's Delaware residence; Dulcé Sloan weighs in on The Embrace, Boston's statue honoring Martin Luther King, Jr.; Leslie asks New Yorkers how they celebrated Martin Luther King Jr. Day; Morris Chestnut on the importance of The Best Man franchise depicting Black male friendships.
3767	January 18	Leslie Jones	Alexis McGill Johnson	Planned Parenthood
Leslie talks about universities banning the use of TikTok and George Santos fabricating his background; Michael Kosta on the rising cost of eggs; Roy Wood, Jr. joins the Golden State Warriors at the White House; Planned Parenthood president/CEO Alexis McGill Johnson discusses the impact of the Dobbs decision on reproductive rights.
3768	January 19	Leslie Jones	Charlamagne Tha God	The Breakfast Club; The Black Effect Podcast Network
Leslie critiques Stephen A. Smith's apology for voicing indifference over Rihanna's upcoming Super Bowl Halftime appearance; Desi Lydic discusses the federal government's debt ceiling crisis; Leslie discusses the need for men to go to therapy in "Long Story Short," after which Charlamagne Tha God discusses his & his family's own mental health histories.
3769	January 23	Wanda Sykes	Mike Epps	The Upshaws
Wanda critiques Donald Trump's awkward eulogy for supporter Lynnette “Diamond” Hardaway; Roy Wood, Jr. interviews Brits about America's gun culture; Mike Epps discusses working with legendary women on The Upshaws and giving back to the towns he performs in.
3770	January 24	Wanda Sykes	Katha Pollitt	The Nation; Pro: Reclaiming Abortion Rights
Wanda discusses the U.S. Senate hearing on Ticketmaster; Roy Wood, Jr. opines on the redesign of Splash Mountain at Disneyland and the Magic Kingdom; Katha Pollitt discusses how personal experiences and the Dobbs decision affect the fight for reproductive rights.
3771	January 25	Wanda Sykes	Nia Long	Missing; You People
Wanda talks about Ukraine receiving tanks from the U.S. and Germany, as well as amounts of lead in baby food; Roy Wood, Jr. explores police militarization and Atlanta's "Cop City"; Nia Long discusses working with Eddie Murphy on You People and why "this thing called art should be representative of all of us."
3772	January 26	Wanda Sykes	Sherrilyn Ifill	Ford Foundation
"Headlines" include Meta Platforms' reinstatement of Donald Trump, an AI chat version of Hitler, and museums using the term "mummified person" instead of the horror-associated "mummy"; Wanda and Roy Wood, Jr. discuss Missouri's plan to pay teachers to learn how to teach patriotism instead of critical race theory; "Long Story Short" (Wanda talks up income-based traffic fines); Sherrilyn Ifill discusses leaving the NAACP's Legal Defense Fund, and why she considers the U.S. a "teenage" democracy.
3773	January 30	D. L. Hughley	Ben Crump Ibram X. Kendi and Nic Stone	Killing of Tyre Nichols How to Be a (Young) Antiracist
D. L. and Roy Wood, Jr. analyze the murder of Tyre Nichols by members of an elite Memphis police unit; Ben Crump, attorney for Nichols' family, discusses the officers' arrest and the problems with policing in America; Ibram Kendi and Nick Stone discuss the all-encompassing effects of racism, and the importance of giving oneself grace when learning to be anti-racist.
3774	January 31	D. L. Hughley	PJ Morton	Watch the Sun
D. L. follows up on the Tyre Nichols case and its fallout, and analyzes PagerDuty's CEO quoting Martin Luther King, Jr. in their layoff letter to employees; Desi Lydic on a pro-Nazi home-school curriculum in Ohio; "Jordan Klepper Fingers the Pulse" (Jordan attends a Donald Trump campaign rally in South Carolina); PJ Morton discusses getting creative during the COVID lockdown, and is joined by poet Amir Sulaimain in a performance of "Be Like Water."

=== February ===
No.	Date	Hosted by	Guest(s)	Promotion
3775	February 1	D. L. Hughley	Dominique Foxworth	The Dominique Foxworth Show
D. L. examines Tyre Nichols' funeral & Tom Brady's retirement, and talks with Los Angelenos about Black History Month; Dominique Foxworth discussing protecting the safety and health of NFL players.
3776	February 2	D. L. Hughley	Mac Phipps	Son of the City
D. L. analyzes Sean Hannity's claim that cops don't have racial biases; Dulcé Sloan reacts to a child's accidental $1,000 Grubhub order; "Long Story Short" (D. L. examines the use of rap lyrics as evidence in criminal cases).
3777	February 6	Chelsea Handler	U.S. Senator Raphael Warnock	Put Your Shoes On & Get Ready!
Chelsea talks about the Chinese spy balloon; Dulcé Sloan on avoiding extreme winter weather; Raphael Warnock discusses issues of race and honoring his late father's legacy.
3778	February 7	Chelsea Handler	Ashley Graham	TBA
Chelsea criticizes Tucker Carlson's criticism over diversity; "Comedian Roundtable" (Chelsea talks with Matteo Lane, Larry Owens, and Sam Jay); Ashley Graham talks about motherhood, body positivity, and being honest on social media.
3779	February 8	Chelsea Handler	Alycia Baumgardner	TBA
Roy Wood, Jr. covers the State of the Union address; "Long Story Short" (Chelsea examines biases against women who choose to be child-free); Alycia Baumgardner talks about the newfound attention of women's boxing and winning the super featherweight boxing title.
3780	February 9	Chelsea Handler	Lea Michele	Funny Girl
Chelsea on the Chinese spy balloon recovery; "Comedian Roundtable" (Chelsea talks with Atsuko Okatsuka, Rosebud Baker, and Bob the Drag Queen); Lea Michele on returning to Broadway to play Fanny Brice in Funny Girl, and her life as a wife and mother.
3781	February 13	Sarah Silverman	Lizz Winstead	Abortion Access Front
Sarah talks about UFO theories and Rihanna's Super Bowl halftime performance; Roy Wood, Jr. on attempts to weaken child labor laws; a profile of "Dr. Insidia, the world's first female mad scientist" (in honor of International Day of Women and Girls in Science); TDS co-creator Lizz Winstead discusses how "you can expose hypocrisy with humor" and her work in social activism.
3782	February 14	Sarah Silverman	U.S. Rep. Maxwell Frost	TBA
Sarah discusses Nikki Hayley's presidential bid, the U.S. Army's enlistment woes, and the Church of England's decision to make God gender-neutral; Michael Kosta warns of Valentine's Day scammers; Maxwell Frost talks about how to engage Generation Z in politics, and how his views on elected officials have changed now that he is one.
3783	February 15	Sarah Silverman	Kareem Abdul-Jabbar	TBA
Sarah on a Newsmax reporter questioning whether Joe Biden is "woke"; "Double Take" (Roy Wood, Jr. and Desi Lydic discuss air travel woes); Kareem Abdul-Jabbar discusses leading a life of activism, his friendship with Bruce Lee, and being surpassed by LeBron James as the all-time NBA scoring leader.
3784	February 16	Sarah Silverman	Jia Tolentino	The New Yorker; Trick Mirror
Sarah opines on North Korea barring anyone from sharing the same name as Kim Jong-un's daughter, as well as studies revealing that the average penis length has increased; "Jordan Klepper Fingers the Pulse" (Jordan reports from Nikki Hayley's presidential campaign launch); Sara's "Long Story Short" essay and her interview with Jia Tolentino concern how media & tech companies provoke (and profit from) audiences' anger and emotions.
3785	February 27	Hasan Minhaj	Giannis Antetokounmpo	Milwaukee Bucks; The Charles Antetokounmpo Family Foundation
Hasan analyzes the U.S. Energy Department's "low confidence" conclusion that COVID was caused by a lab leak, as well as the Dilbert comic strip being dropped following its author's racist rant; kids discuss issues that matter most to them; Giannis Antetokounmpo talks about his love of family and American sweet foods, and is challenged by Hasan to trash talk fellow NBA stars.
3786	February 28	Hasan Minhaj	Rebel Wilson	Fluid dating app
Hasan discusses Dominion Voting Systems' lawsuit against Fox News and the Biden Administration's ban of TikTok on government devices; Hasan and tech blogger Marques Brownlee test smart gadgets; Rebel Wilson recalls getting engaged at (and being temporarily banned from) Disneyland, and how her personal dating history led her to co-create Fluid.

=== March ===
No.	Date	Hosted by	Guest(s)	Promotion
3787	March 1	Hasan Minhaj	Hasan Minhaj's daughter	TBA
An analysis of the politics surrounding the East Palestine, Ohio train derailment; Hasan discusses the Twitter "hellscape" (and deletes his own Twitter account on-air); Hasan talks with his daughter on her birthday.
3788	March 2	Hasan Minhaj	Kevin O'Leary	Shark Tank
Hasan on King Charles III forcing Prince Andrew out of his mansion; Roy Wood, Jr. on the Tooth Fairy's rates increasing; "Long Story Short" (the prevalence, and stupidity, of modern-day financial scam artists); Hasan and Kevin O'Leary discuss cryptocurrencies and the bankruptcy of FTX.
3789	March 6	Marlon Wayans	Mason Gooding	Scream VI
Marlon analyzes the previous weekend's CPAC conference, Ja Morant's suspension from the NBA, and the debate over racial reparations in California; Mason Gooding on how Scream VI is more violent than previous films in the series.
3790	March 7	Marlon Wayans	Bomani Jones	Game Theory
A look at Tucker Carlson's selective use of January 6 attack footage; "Choppin' It Up with 'Quon" (Marlon, as 'Quon, interviews New York City Mayor Eric Adams); Bomani Jones on his viral interview with Jake Paul.
3791	March 8	Marlon Wayans	Derrick "D'Nice" Jones	TBA
Marlon discusses Tucker Carlson's texts about Donald Trump, and gathers New Yorkers' thoughts on the 95th Academy Awards; D'Nice on the golden anniversary of hip hop music and the third anniversary of his virtual party Club Quarantine.
3792	March 9	Marlon Wayans	Omar Epps	Nubia: The Awakening
A look at a report uncovering racism within Louisville's police department; "Long Story Short" (the importance of after-school programs).
3793	March 13	Kal Penn	U.S. President Joe Biden	TBA
A look at the collapse of Silicon Valley Bank (and Fox News blaming it on "woke" culture); Kal and President Joe Biden talk about passing bipartisan legislation and young people's impact on policy issues.
3794	March 14	Kal Penn	Pakistani Foreign Minister Bilawal Bhutto Zardari	TBA
Coverage of Joe Biden's approval of a drilling project and Newark's entering into a fake sister city arrangement; Kal heads to Las Vegas Motor Speedway to reveal how NASCAR is "different from what you probably think"; Bilawal Bhutto Zardari discusses how his views on the climate crisis changed after experiencing unprecedented floods first-hand.
3795	March 15	Kal Penn	Radhika Jones	Vanity Fair
Kal on the EPA banning "forever chemicals" in drinking water; Drs. Lawrence Kutner (Kal reprising his House, M.D. character) and Gregory House treat a patient suffering from "woke mind virus"; Radhika Jones on Vanity Fair's embrace of evolving culture and the elevating of new voices.
3796	March 16	Kal Penn	Chasten Buttigieg	I Have Something to Tell You—For Young Adults
Kal on a seaweed blob approaching the Florida coast; "Long Story Short" (youth voter suppression).
3797	March 20	Al Franken	U.S. Senator Lindsey Graham	TBA
An examination of Donald Trump's legal woes and the ICC's warrant issuance against Vladimir Putin; former senator Franken and current senator Graham discuss the Russian invasion of Ukraine.
3798	March 21	Al Franken	Alan Ruck	Succession
Al examines the United Nations' climate change report, and rides along with New York City sanitation workers.
3799	March 22	Al Franken	Heather McGhee	The Sum of Us podcast
Al on a Minnesota Senator's argument against free school lunches; "Jordan Klepper Fingers the Pulse" (Jordan attends a New York City protest against Donald Trump's potential arrest); "The People Behind the People" profiles "Gavin Bancroft," the "face coach" to Tucker Carlson; Heather McGhee discusses some of the history that created the racial wealth divide.
3800	March 23	Al Franken	BenDeLaCreme	Drag Defense Fund
"Headlines" (Al discusses a Congressional hearing concerning TikTok, the extension of Florida's "Don't Say Gay" law to 12th grade, and a DNA study into Beethoven's death); "Long Story Short" (fearmongering by conservatives over the IRS); BenDeLaCreme discusses anti-LGBTQ legislation.
3801	March 27	John Leguizamo	Ana Navarro	The View
John breaks down Donald Trump's rally in Waco, Texas; Ronny Chieng discusses a Florida school principal being fired over a lesson plan that includes Michelangelo's David statue; John demonstrates what he encounters as a Latino actor auditioning in Hollywood; Ana Navarro discusses the importance of unity among Latinos and underrepresented groups.
3802	March 28	John Leguizamo	Diane Guerrero	n/a
A critique of GOP lawmakers' response to the Covenant School shooting; John has a dance-off with break dancer Crazy Legs; Diane Guerrero on the need for more representation in Hollywood, being separated from her immigrant parents at 14, and how she proves that she voiced Isabela Madrigal in Encanto.
3803	March 29	John Leguizamo	Princess Nokia	i love you but this is goodbye
John and Roy Wood, Jr. discuss Mike Pence being compelled into grand jury testimony against Donald Trump; John hits the street to give New Yorkers a "Latinx IQ test," but interrupting kids demand that he "do the voice."
3804	March 30	John Leguizamo	U.S. Representative Ritchie Torres	TBA
John celebrates that day's indictment of Donald Trump; "Long Story Short" (misconceptions about the Mexico–United States border); Ritchie Torres on his first few weeks in Congress in 2021, the introduction of the S.A.N.T.O.S. Act (for "Stopping Another Non-Truthful Office Seeker"), and the need for gun reform policy.

=== April ===
No.	Date	Hosted by	Guest(s)	Promotion
3805	April 3	Roy Wood Jr.	U.S. Senator Cory Booker	TBA
Roy discusses Florida's Stop WOKE Act with an education adviser to Governor Ron DeSantis, and presents to viewers a "White History 101" class.
3806	April 4	Roy Wood Jr.	Robin Thede	A Black Lady Sketch Show
Roy talks about "The Indictment Circus"; former TDS host Jon Stewart tries to help Roy's coverage of Donald Trump's arraignment "go viral" (though with Jon wearing an Obi-Wan Kenobi robe, their conversation turns to which Star Wars character they could portray); Jordan Klepper reports from the scene outside New York County Courthouse and shouts questions to Congress members Marjorie Taylor Greene and George Santos.
3807	April 5	Roy Wood Jr.	Cedric the Entertainer	The Neighborhood
Roy examines the Wisconsin Supreme Court election result; Dulcé Sloan on why Melania Trump has been absent from Donald Trump's side during his legal ordeal; "Jordan Klepper Fingers the Pulse" (Jordan chats with protestors outside Trump's indictment); Cedric the Entertainer discusses directing The Neighborhood's 100th episode.
3808	April 6	Roy Wood Jr.	Jerry Craft	School Trip
Roy and Desi Lydic on Jill Biden inviting the championship-losing Iowa Hawkeyes women's basketball team to the White House; "Long Story Short" (the value of a 4-year college degree); Jerry Craft on the irony of having a book being banned over critical race theory, a misconception about graphic novels, and how books should leave kids inspired.
3809	April 17	Jordan Klepper	Betty Gilpin	Mrs. Davis
Jordan recaps the NRA convention; Ronny Chieng on the Clarence Thomas-Harlan Crow controversy; Jordan interviews U.S. Representative Alexandria Ocasio-Cortez at New York's Jacobi Medical Center, home to a program that addresses violence as a public health issue.
3810	April 18	Jordan Klepper	Charley Crockett	The Man from Waco
Jordan and Desi Lydic discuss who's the biggest "alpha male" in the news; "Jordan Klepper Fingers the Pulse" (Jordan travels to "the world's largest gun show" in Tulsa, Oklahoma).
3811	April 19	Jordan Klepper	Michael Shannon	Waco: The Aftermath
Jordan analyzes the impact of the Fox News/Dominion Voting settlement, and travels to Michigan (his home state) to drink beer and discuss gun reform and abortion rights with Governor Gretchen Whitmer.
3812	April 20	Jordan Klepper	Ryan Holiday	The Daily Dad
"Long Story Short" (redefining masculinity and countering Andrew Tate's misogynistic influence on young men and boys); Ryan Holiday discusses the benefits of stoicism and the accessibility of philosophy on the internet and social media.
3813	April 24	Desi Lydic	Catherine Reitman	Workin' Moms
Desi discusses Tucker Carlson's and Don Lemon's ousters from Fox News and CNN, Bud Light's "Real Women" campaign, and Twitter's verification controversy; Roy Wood, Jr. on the Bed Bath & Beyond bankruptcy; Desi offers business mentorship to "the next generation of female leaders." Catherine Reitman on working with Desi on Real Wedding Crashers and with her own husband on Workin' Moms.
3814	April 25	Desi Lydic	Yvette Nicole Brown	Frog and Toad; Act Your Age
In a filmed skit about Wyoming banning misoprostol for human abortion treatments but not for animal health, Desi tries obtain a prescription under the guise that it's for her dog ("she's really trying to focus on her [sled dog] career"); Desi visits the U.S. Department of Transportation to discuss infrastructure and cultural politics with Secretary Pete Buttigieg; Yvette Nicole Brown on how Frog and Toad celebrates differences, the important story being told on Act Your Age, and her encouraging people to vote Democrat.
3815	April 26	Desi Lydic	Jameela Jamil	Bad Dates; I Weigh
A look Fox News' dossier against Tucker Carlson, Disney suing Ron DeSantis, and Hugh Grant being cast as an oompa loompa; Michael Kosta on the mating habitats of great white sharks; Desi travels to her home town of Louisville to field Kentuckians' thoughts on recent "extreme" moves by the state's legislature; Jameela Jamil on her social media presence and the benefits of exercise on mental health.
3816	April 27	Desi Lydic	Sophia Bush	Drama Queens; 2:22 A Ghost Story
Desi examines Tucker Carlson & Don Lemon speaking out after their firings and Marjorie Taylor Greene branding a stepmother as not a "real mother"; Dulcé Sloan, Jordan Klepper, and Roy Wood, Jr. debate the issue of birds colliding with jet planes; "Long Story Short" (suspect claims about benefits of products & trends in the health & wellness industry); Sophia Bush on whether she'd run for public office and the cathartic effect of the One Tree Hill re-watch podcast Drama Queens; "Your Moment of Zen" (home video shows a young Desi hosting her own talk show from her bedroom).

=== May ===
No.	Date	Hosted by	Guest(s)	Promotion
3817	May 1	Dulcé Sloan	Sasha Colby	RuPaul's Drag Race
Dulcé and Roy Wood, Jr. discuss legislative efforts to regulate juveniles' social media access; "We Don't Do That" (Black Surfing Association co-founder Lou Harris teaches Dulcé how to surf.

=== October ===
No.	Date	Hosted by	Guest(s)	Promotion
3818	October 16	Michael Kosta	Ian Bremmer	The Power of Crisis; GZERO World
Desi Lydic talks to fans seeing Taylor Swift's concert film; "Jordan Klepper Fingers the Pulse" (Jordan attends a Donald Trump campaign rally in New Hampshire); Michael and Ian Bremmer discuss the Gaza war.
3819	October 17	Michael Kosta	Emily Oster	The Unexpected
Ronny Chieng dismisses the newly-cited "hottest chili pepper on Earth," Pepper X; Michael examines why California conservation law classifies bees as fish.
3820	October 18	Michael Kosta	Rhiannon Giddens	You're the One; Omar
Michael and Desi Lydic discuss whether a yule log video that was mistaken for an actual fire (and led to a NYFD call) may also have been a stalker situation; "Long Story Short" (bottled water's impact on the environment); Rhiannon Giddens performs "Another Wasted Life" (from You're the One) and discusses the song's inspiration as well as that of the opera Omar.
3821	October 19	Michael Kosta & Ronny Chieng	Jordan Jonas	Alone
Michael, Ronny, and Troy Iwata discuss Scholastic Corporation segregating books concerning race and gender diversity at school book fairs; Michael and Jordan Jonas talk connecting with nature and developing an outdoors skillset.
3822	October 23	Desus Nice	U.S. Representative Alexandria Ocasio-Cortez	TBA
Desus hits the streets to ask what makes a New Yorker a "real" New Yorker; Alexandria Ocasio-Cortez discusses immigration reform and creating paths to American citizenship.
3823	October 24	Desus Nice	Nana Kwame Adjei-Brenyah	Chain-Gang All Stars
Insisting he's "just reading the news," Desus discusses fraud accusations surrounding radio personality DJ Envy, with whom Desus has had a longstanding feud; "Back in Black with Lewis Black" (Lewis analyzes The Golden Bachelor).
3824	October 25	Desus Nice	Sydney Colson	The Syd + TP Show
Desus discusses Mike Johnson becoming Speaker of the House; "Project: Conspiracy" ("Kevin Matthew Kelp" tells of a "fake bug crisis" surrounding the invasive spotted lanternfly); Sydney Colson talks about winning the WNBA title with the Las Vegas Aces.
3825	October 26	Desus Nice	D Smoke	"Work Hard Play Hard"
"Long Story Short" (taxpayer-funded sports stadiums); D Smoke talks about teaching high school and collaborating musically with his brother, SiR.
3826	October 30	Charlamagne tha God	U.S. Representative Nancy Mace	TBA
Charlamagne tries to guess the political leanings of average New Yorkers based on their appearances.
3827	October 31	Charlamagne tha God	Rich Paul	Lucky Me: A Memoir of Changing the Odds
In Santa Fe, New Mexico, Michael Kosta meets a paranormal investigator who clears ghosts from properties on the real estate market.

=== November ===
No.	Date	Hosted by	Guest(s)	Promotion
3828	November 1	Charlamagne tha God	Nikki Haley	TBA
Charlamagne opines on the rise in anti-semitism and Islamophobia in America, as well as Chris Broussard pejoratively describing James Harden; Desi Lydic, "the proud daughter and niece of 'booty patrollers,'" offers her take on a Florida man driving a "Booty Patrol" truck made to mimic a CBP vehicle; Nikki Haley discusses her bid for the 2024 Republican Party nomination for President and her support of term limits for U.S. Senators.
3829	November 2	Charlamagne tha God	Doug Melville	Invisible Generals
Grace Kuhlenschmidt on George Santos surviving an expulsion attempt by his House colleagues; "Long Story Short" (why Joe Biden is struggling in opinion polls); Doug Melville discusses telling the untold stories of America's first Black generals, the need to control one's own narrative, and how Americans can honor veterans without glorifying war.
3830	November 6	Sarah Silverman	Joel Madden	Ink Master
Sarah discusses Donald Trump's testimony in the civil trial of his company; "The Daily Showography" (a profile of "crazy boring" House Speaker Mike Johnson).
3831	November 7	Sarah Silverman	Cat Bohannon	Eve: How the Female Body Drove 200 Million Years of Human Evolution
Sarah talks about Robert F. Kennedy, Jr.'s presidential candidacy and orcas attacking yachts; Ronny Chieng on WeWork's bankruptcy; Sarah visits a cannabis dispensary in New York City.
3832	November 8	Sarah Silverman	Margo Price	Maybe We’ll Make It: A Memoir; Strays
Sarah celebrates Election Day victories by Democratic candidates and pro-choice supporters, while Grace Kuhlenschmidt offers rebranding ideas for the pro-life movement; "Long Story Short" (protecting artists' rights in the age of AI); Margo Price performs "Lydia" from her album, Strays.
3833	November 9	Sarah Silverman	Judd Apatow	Please Don't Destroy: The Treasure of Foggy Mountain
"Doomocracy 2024" (Sarah, Desi Lydic, and Dulcé Sloan analyze the previous night's GOP presidential debate); a trailer for the latest horror movie reboot, Rosemary's Co-Pay, finds hospital exec Sarah claiming the newborn son of Satan due to lack of insurance; Judd Apatow jokes about what he did during the strikes and shares photos from his career.
3834	November 13	Leslie Jones	Lisa Leslie	TBA
Leslie has thoughts on Tim Scott suspending his campaign for President and Donald Trump calling his opponents "vermin"; in a pre-filmed ad, Leslie shows you how to shut down annoying relatives' uncomfortable opinions at Thanksgiving; Lisa Leslie discusses basketball, tall-girl fashion, and the importance of teaching financial literacy to young athletes.
3835	November 14	Leslie Jones	Steve Kornacki	NBC News & MSNBC
Leslie opines on the Supreme Court's new ethics code, and is itching to see fisticuffs in Congress; Dulcé Sloan weighs in on a petition against gender non-binary performers in the Macy's Thanksgiving Day Parade; Troy Iwata investigates the business of professional cuddling; Steve Kornacki and his "biggest fan" (Leslie) talk about keeping statistics straight and current polling for the 2024 elections.
3836	November 15	Leslie Jones	Allyson Felix	Saysh
Leslie criticizes San Francisco's cleaning spree prior to the Joe Biden/Xi Jinping meeting, and comes to the defense of the money-losing U.S. Postal Service; Desi Lydic joins the "Congressional Fight Club"; "Leslie Jones Tries Not to Lose Her S**t" over Robert F. Kennedy, Jr.'s presidential campaign.
3837	November 16	Leslie Jones & Jordan Klepper	Taika Waititi	Next Goal Wins; Our Flag Means Death
Leslie and Jordan tag team on headlines including a House ethics report on George Santos and André 3000's flute album; Leslie challenges New Yorkers to say nice things about deplorable people; Leslie and Taika Waititi discuss the true story that inspired Next Goal Wins.
3838	November 20	Dulcé Sloan	Vashti Harrison	Big
Dulcé talks about Javier Milei ("Evil Austin Powers") capturing Argentina's presidency, while Ronny Chieng analyzes the sudden shutdown of an "AI girlfriend" service; Dulcé uses a device that simulates menstral cramps on TDS' male staffers; Vashti Harrison discusses illustrating the effects of harsh words on, and the need for self-acceptance among, big-sized young Black girls in her book, Big.
3839	November 21	Ronny Chieng	John Oliver	Last Week Tonight
Ronny and Michael Kosta discuss how popular weight loss drugs may affect Thanksgiving eating habits; "The People Behind the People" (a profile of "Barnaby Dirk," the man tasked with scheduling Donald Trump's many court appearances); TDS alum John Oliver recalls advice he gave to Ronny after the latter joined the show, and talks about bringing an outsider's perspective to American comedy.
3840	November 22	Jordan Klepper & Desi Lydic	U.S. Representative Jeff Jackson	TBA
Desi and Jordan crash Fox News' Christmas tree lighting ceremony; "In My Opinion" (John Leguizamo criticizes Univision's interview with Donald Trump); Jeff Jackson discusses conversing with constituents on TikTok and the fight against gerrymandering.
3841	November 27	Michelle Wolf	Eric André	The Eric André Show; Dumb Ideas
Michelle talks about the rush of sexual assault claims before the expiration of New York's Adult Survivors Act; Michael Kosta on astronauts suffering from erectile dysfunction; Michelle hits the streets to ask whether white women deserve the "Karen" reputation.
3842	November 28	Michelle Wolf	Da'Vine Joy Randolph	The Holdovers
In between drop-ins on Jesse Watters' lengthy Thanksgiving errands rant at Fox News, Michelle comments on Donald Trump's "strategic" moderation on abortion and the UAE's attempt to make oil deals at COP28, while Ronny Chieng opines on Red Lobster's money-losing "endless shrimp" promotion; Grace Kuhlenschmidt examines whether it's possible to live off the electrical grid in Manhattan.
3843	November 29	Michelle Wolf	Mehdi Hasan	Win Every Argument: The Art of Debating, Persuading, and Public Speaking
Michelle talks up the latest House expulsion vote attempt facing George Santos and Americans for Prosperity endorsing Nikki Haley's presidential bid; Grace Kuhlenschmidt on Buy Buy Baby's return from bankruptcy; in a spoof of reverse mortgage ads, a dark-haired and mustachioed Michelle offers a chance to "get saddled with debt" by throwing in a horse with a mortgage.
3844	November 30	Michelle Wolf	Dr. Stuart Fischbein	Birthing Instincts podcast
Ronny Chieng and Michael Kosta debate whether Henry Kissinger is the greatest war criminal of all time; Michelle (a recent home-birth mother) examines the high cost of hospital births in "Long Story Short," and compares hospital obstetrics and midwifery with Dr. Stuart Fischbein.

=== December ===
No.	Date	Hosted by	Guest(s)	Promotion
3845	December 4	Charlamagne tha God	S. A. Cosby	All the Sinners Bleed; Brokedown Prophets
Charlamagne covers the House's expulsion of George Santos and Felicity Huffman's speaking out on her conviction in the Varsity Blues scandal; Ronny Chieng, Desi Lydic, and Michael Kosta have their own debate over the Ron DeSantis/Gavin Newsom debate on Fox News; Charlmagne asks New Yorkers about their Spotify Wrapped playlists.
3846	December 5	Charlamagne tha God	Robin Thede	Candy Cane Lane
Charlmagne discusses the dire warnings being expressed over a possible second Donald Trump presidency; Desi Lydic on a 70-year-old Ugandan giving birth; "Back in Black with Lewis Black" (an appreciation of the good things about 2023); Robin Thede recalls trying to make Tracee Ellis Ross and Eddie Murphy break character while filming Candy Cane Lane, and what she's most proud about from A Black Lady Sketch Show.
3847	December 6	Charlamagne tha God	Michael Rubin	Reform Alliance
Charlamagne opines on why "we don't need (Joe) Biden to defeat Donald Trump" and Trump's "dictator on day one" remarks in "Doomocracy 2024"; Ronny Chieng and a defensive Michael Kosta debate for and against Time honoring Taylor Swift as its Person of the Year; "The Daily Showography" ("Vivek Ramaswamy: Enter the RamaVerse").
3848	December 7	Charlamagne tha God	Jelly Roll	Whitsitt Chapel
"Doomocracy 2024" (a recap of the 4th Republican presidential debate); contestant Mary (Grace Kuhlenschmidt) tries to get a GOP lawmaker (Michael Kosta) to guess the reason for America's mass shooting epidemic ("just say 'guns!'") on "The $1,000,000 Republican Pyramid"; "Long Story Short" (Americans' obsession with celebrity politicians); Jelly Roll on writing a song ("She") about the fentanyl crisis and having family, faith, and therapy in his life.
3849	December 11	Kal Penn	Zoya Akhtar	The Archies
Kal covers Hunter Biden's indictment and Congress' holdup of funding for Ukraine and Israel; Grace Kuhlenschmidt investigates Target's pride-themed nutcracker doll; Zoya Akhtar discusses infusing inclusive stories from her native India into her work, and whether she'd make a Bollywood version of Kal's Harold & Kumar.
3850	December 12	Kal Penn	Vir Das	Landing
Kal opines on court cases surrounding efforts by Donald Trump and Rudy Giuliani to overturn the 2020 election, and hears Indian-Americans' thoughts on the 2024 race; Grace Kuhlenschmidt offers a solution to the abortion debate in Texas; Vir Das discusses reactions to his comedy, and credits Kal for influencing him to attend college in America.
3851	December 13	Kal Penn	Mike Massimino	Moonshot: A NASA Astronaut's Guide to Achieving the Impossible
Kal covers Donald Trump's latest NFT offer and the COP28 climate deal; Desi Lydic and Ronny Chieng debate whether Democrats should gerrymander Congressional districts; a filmed skit finds Santa Claus (Kal) and his accountant elf (Chieng) needing to pay their bank loans; Mike Massimino on intelligent life in space and lessons learned as an astronaut.
3852	December 14	Kal Penn	Taraji P. Henson	The Color Purple
Kal analyzes House Republicans' impeachment inquiry against President Biden and the return of whole milk to school lunches; Troy Iwata on a controversial holiday party invitation from the office of Boston's mayor; "Long Story Short" (de-stigmatizing sex work and protecting those who make a living in the trade).
