= The Comment Section =

American television series

- Genre: Infotainment
- Presented by: Michael Kosta
- Theme music composer: Mike Fiore
- Country of origin: United States
- Original language: English
- No. of seasons: 1
- No. of episodes: 6

Production
- Executive producers: Joel McHale; K.P. Anderson; Jason Burns; Greg Heller
- Camera setup: Multiple
- Running time: 22 minutes
- Production companies: Wilshire Studios Free Period; Pygmy Wolf Productions

Original release
- Network: E!
- Release: August 7 – September 11, 2015

Related
- The Soup

The Comment Section is a weekly American infotainment television series which premiered on the E! network, on August 7, 2015. Announced in May 2015, the show is hosted by Michael Kosta and "explores the biggest stories of the week and all of the outrageous and hilarious comments made about them on social media."
