= Troy Iwata =

American comedian and actor

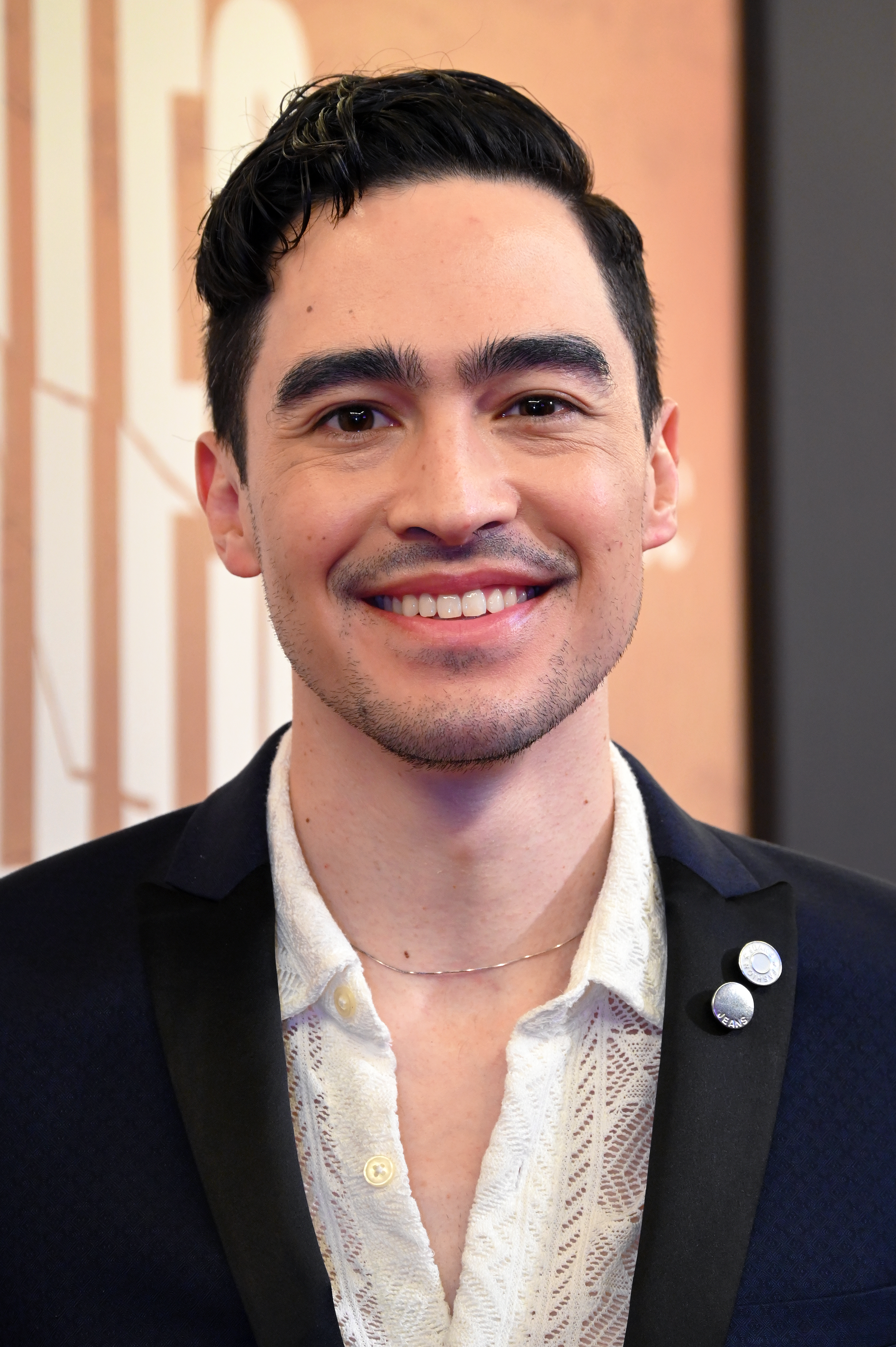
- Iwata in 2025
- Born: February 10, 1991 (age 35)
- Education: Vanguard University
- Employer: The Daily Show

Troy Iwata (born February 10, 1991) is an American comedian, actor, and singer. Since 2023, he has been a correspondent on The Daily Show.

== Early life and career ==
Iwata was born in 1991 to a Russian Jewish mother and a Japanese father. His parents split when he was three, and he was largely raised by his mother. He started acting in high school and continued at Vanguard University. In 2019, Iwata made his Broadway debut in the musical Be More Chill. In 2023, Iwata made his debut on The Daily Show.

== Personal life ==
Iwata lives in New York City. He is gay.

== Filmography ==
=== Film ===
Year	Title	Role	Notes
2020	What Lies Below	Tommy	
2021	Burning Man: The Musical	Joe	
2023	Summoning Sylvia	Reggie	
2024	Space Cadet	Hector Kaneko	

=== Television ===
Year	Title	Role	Notes
2018–2021	New Amsterdam	Multiple	3 episodes
2020	Dash & Lily	Langston	8 episodes
2022	WeCrashed	Damian Saito	6 episodes
2023–present	The Daily Show	Himself	Recurring correspondent
