= Yair Rosenberg =

American journalist

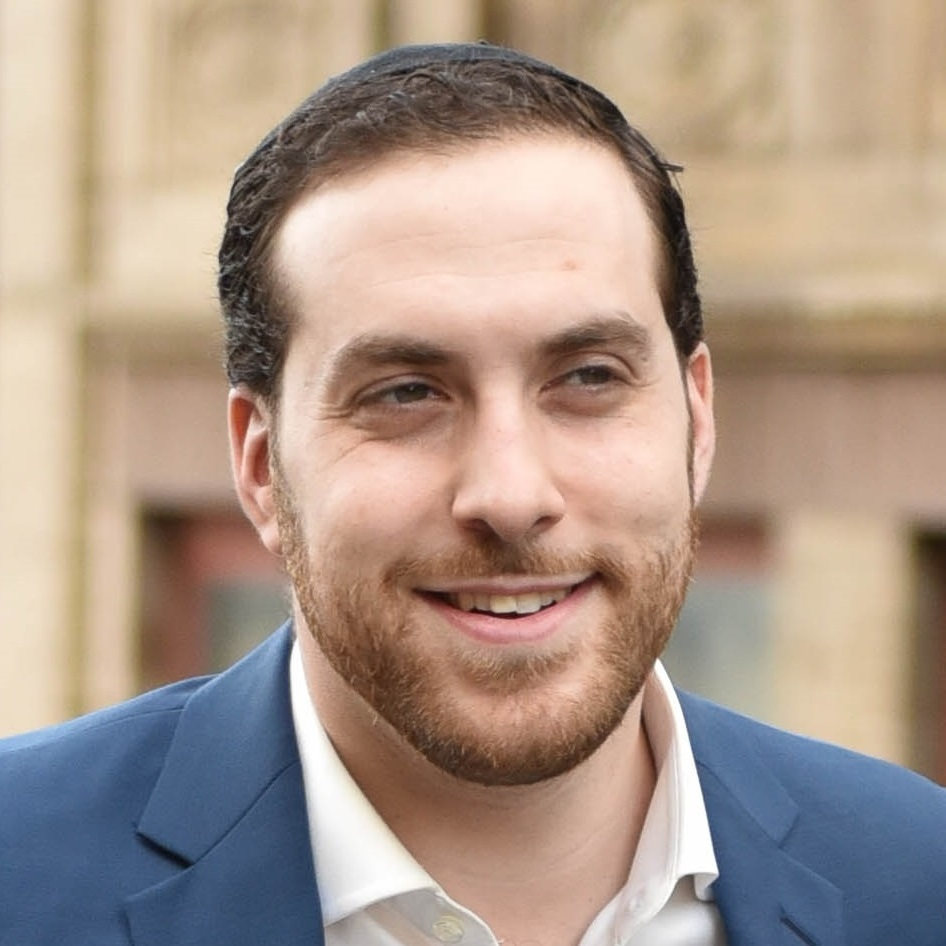
- Born: New York City, New York, U.S
- Education: Harvard University (AB)
- Occupation: Journalist

Yair Rosenberg is an American journalist who is currently a staff writer at The New York Times writing about religion for their National section.

Formerly a staff writer at The Atlantic, where he wrote the Deep Shtetl newsletter beginning in 2021, and previously a senior writer at Tablet, where he covered politics, culture, and religion, and is a regular speaker and commentator on antisemitism in the modern era and on strategies to combat abuse on online platforms.

== Education ==
Rosenberg went to Yeshiva University High School for Boys. He attended Harvard University, where he graduated magna cum laude in 2012. While at Harvard, he worked for The Harvard Crimson. His academic work won awards from the Harvard Center for Jewish Studies.

== Career ==
Beginning in 2012, Rosenberg covered national elections in the U.S. and Israel, and his work on these and other subjects appeared in The New York Times, Washington Post, The Atlantic, The Guardian, and the Wall Street Journal, among other outlets. He has interviewed and profiled multiple White House chiefs of staff and cabinet members. He also elicited a correction from the US Supreme Court on a point of Jewish history.

Until 2021, he was a senior writer at Tablet magazine, where he tackled topics ranging from American Jewish responses to modern critical scholarship of the Bible, to contemporary Islamophobia, to the forgotten history of Mormon–Jewish relations. In particular, he has chronicled the resurgence of antisemitism in Europe and in America. He is also known for his parodies of antisemites on Twitter, and more serious efforts to combat abuse on online platforms, including a video series aimed at educating the uninitiated about the history, nuances, and dangers of modern-day antisemitism. Rosenberg is credited with coining the sarcastic Internet adage Goebbels Gap, which he defined as the amount of time between a negative event transpiring in the world and someone finding a way to blame it on the Jews.

In November 2021, he moved to The Atlantic, and launched a newsletter called Deep Shtetl, where he continued his coverage of politics, culture, antisemitism, and social media dynamics, including an exploration of how a Jewish character came to be on the cult classic sci-fi show Firefly, the story behind the Hanukkah menorah used by Vice President Kamala Harris, interviews with celebrated Jewish authors and artists like Dara Horn and Ben Platt, a profile of Israeli prime minister Yair Lapid, and a deep dive into Albert Einstein's little-known 20-year friendship with Orthodox rabbi Chaim Tchernowitz.

A frequent speaker and commentator on these topics, Rosenberg has addressed audiences around the world, including South By Southwest, the Jerusalem Global Forum for Combating Anti-Semitism, the Limmud conference in Melbourne, Australia, and the Boca Raton Synagogue in Florida, where he debated conservative commentator Ben Shapiro. Rosenberg has written for and been interviewed by The New York Times, Washington Post, Associated Press, CNN, MSNBC, Pod Save the World, Fast Company, and CBC News, among others.

Rosenberg's writings have received awards from the Religion Newswriters Association. In 2017, he was named as one of "36 Under 36" by New York's Jewish Week newspaper.

In June 2026, the New York Times hired Rosenberg, to cover American Jewish life.

=== Target of antisemitism ===
In 2016, a report by the Anti-Defamation League's Task Force on Journalism and Harassment identified Rosenberg as the second-most targeted Jewish journalist receiving online antisemitic abuse due to his critical reporting on Donald Trump's candidacy, following conservative writer Ben Shapiro, and ahead of journalists Jeffrey Goldberg, Sally Kohn and Jake Tapper. "My parents didn't raise me to be number 2," he later wrote in The New York Times. "Fortunately, there's always 2020."

Since the report's publication, Rosenberg has focused extensively on the issue of online harassment and antisemitism, including through the creation of the "Impostor Buster" Twitter bot that exposed neo-Nazi trolls masquerading as minorities on the platform, which received coverage from The New York Times and other global news outlets. Rosenberg also wrote about his experience and efforts to combat online abuse in the Times.

== Music ==
Rosenberg is a singer and composer of original Jewish music. His collaborators include singers Arun Viswanath and Abbaleh Savitt, as well as producer Charles Newman. In August 2022, Rosenberg released his first album, Az Yashir, a compilation of original melodies for traditional Sabbath songs.

"Rosenberg is not the only musically inclined member of his family," reported Jewish Insider, "his grandfather was a Hasidic composer who, as a young man, escaped Nazi Europe with the assistance of Japanese diplomat Chiune Sugihara, who issued him a visa."
