= Desi Lydic =

American comedic actress (born 1981)

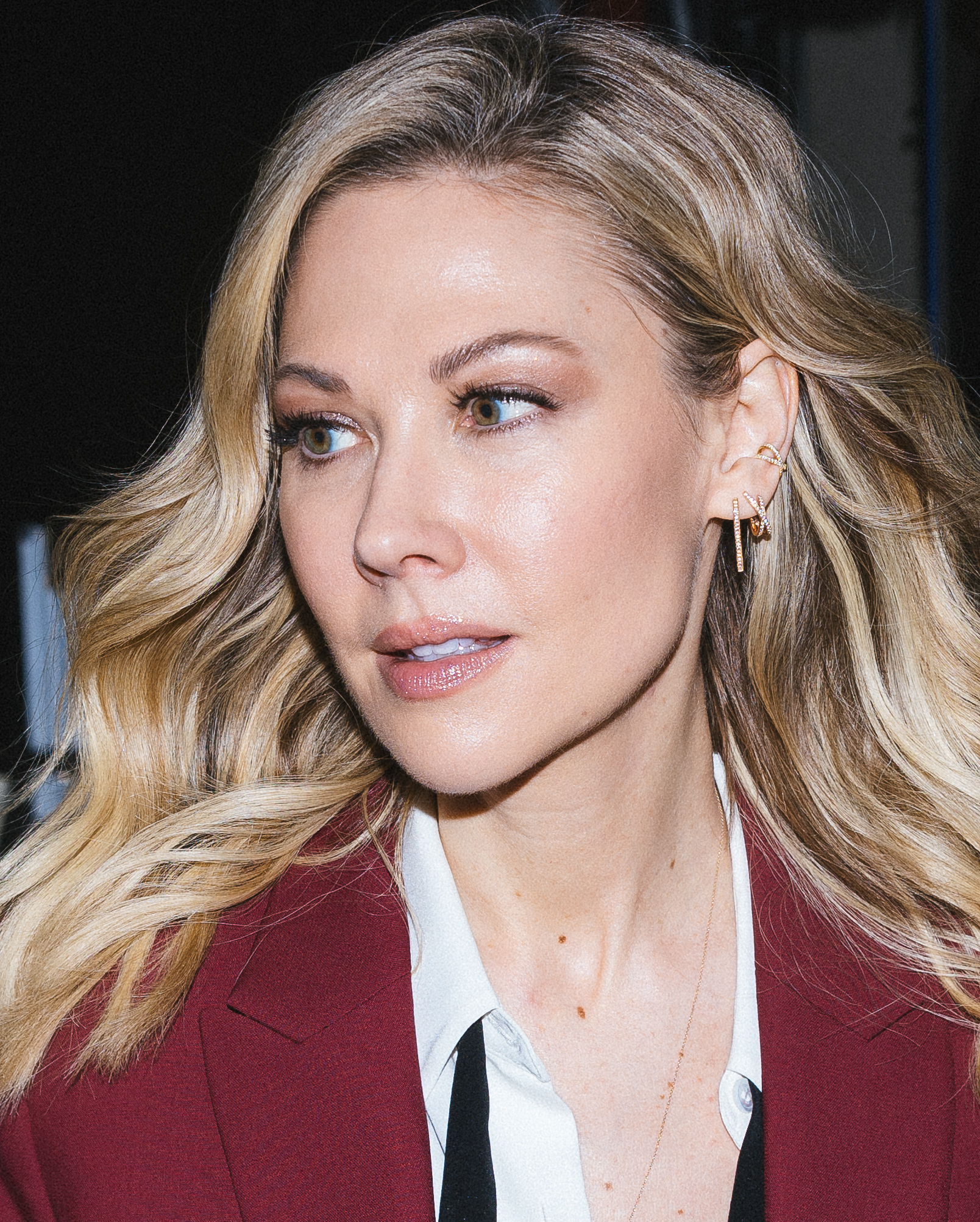
- Lydic in 2024
- Born: Lani Desmonet Lydic; June 30, 1981 (age 45); Louisville, Kentucky, US
- Occupations: Comedian; actress
- Years active: 2001–present
- Spouse: Gannon Brousseau
- Children: 1

Desi Lydic (/ˈdɛzi ˈlaɪdɪk/ DEZ-ee LY-dik, born Lani Desmonet Lydic June 30, 1981) is an American comedian and actress who is a rotating host and senior correspondent on the late-night talk and news satire program The Daily Show. She has won three Emmy Awards: one as a host of The Daily Show, and two as the host and a producer, alongside Jen Flanz, of the short form YouTube series The Daily Show: Desi Lydic Foxsplains. From 2011 to 2016, she starred as guidance counselor Valerie Marks on the MTV comedy-drama series Awkward.

Born in Louisville, Kentucky, Lydic got her start in the 2001 parody film Not Another Teen Movie. She also starred in the Spike miniseries Invasion Iowa alongside William Shatner, and the parody series The Real Wedding Crashers. She appeared as Shea Seger in the 2011 film We Bought a Zoo alongside Matt Damon and Scarlett Johansson, and in the 2013 film The Babymakers with Olivia Munn. Lydic appeared as one half of a lesbian couple on an episode of the Disney Channel series Good Luck Charlie in 2014. She joined Trevor Noah's lineup of correspondents for The Daily Show on September 29, 2015. Lydic was among a number of guest hosts of The Daily Show after the departure of Trevor Noah.

== Early life ==
Desi Lydic was born in 1981 in Louisville, Kentucky. At the age of three, she became interested in comedic acting by watching Carol Burnett play Miss Agatha Hannigan in Annie. As a child, she enrolled in the Young Actors Institute at the Youth Performing Arts School in Louisville and starred in a Kroger commercial.

After she graduated from Eastern High School in the city, she attended the University of Louisville for two semesters before deciding to move to Los Angeles. When she told her parents about her plans, she was not sure what to expect. "I think they saw this creative side in me growing up," she said. "I'm so fortunate because a lot of people don't have families that would've supported them in making such a huge decision like that. But not only did they give me their blessing, my mom and dad packed up a U-Haul and drove us out all the way across the country." She told Kyle Meredith in a 2024 interview that it was during this time that she had an obsession with late '90s Saturday Night Live. She later moved to Los Angeles and became an improvisational actor, performing at The Groundlings and Improv Olympic (iO). At the time iO had a branch in Los Angeles. It opened in 1997 and closed in 2018.

== Career ==
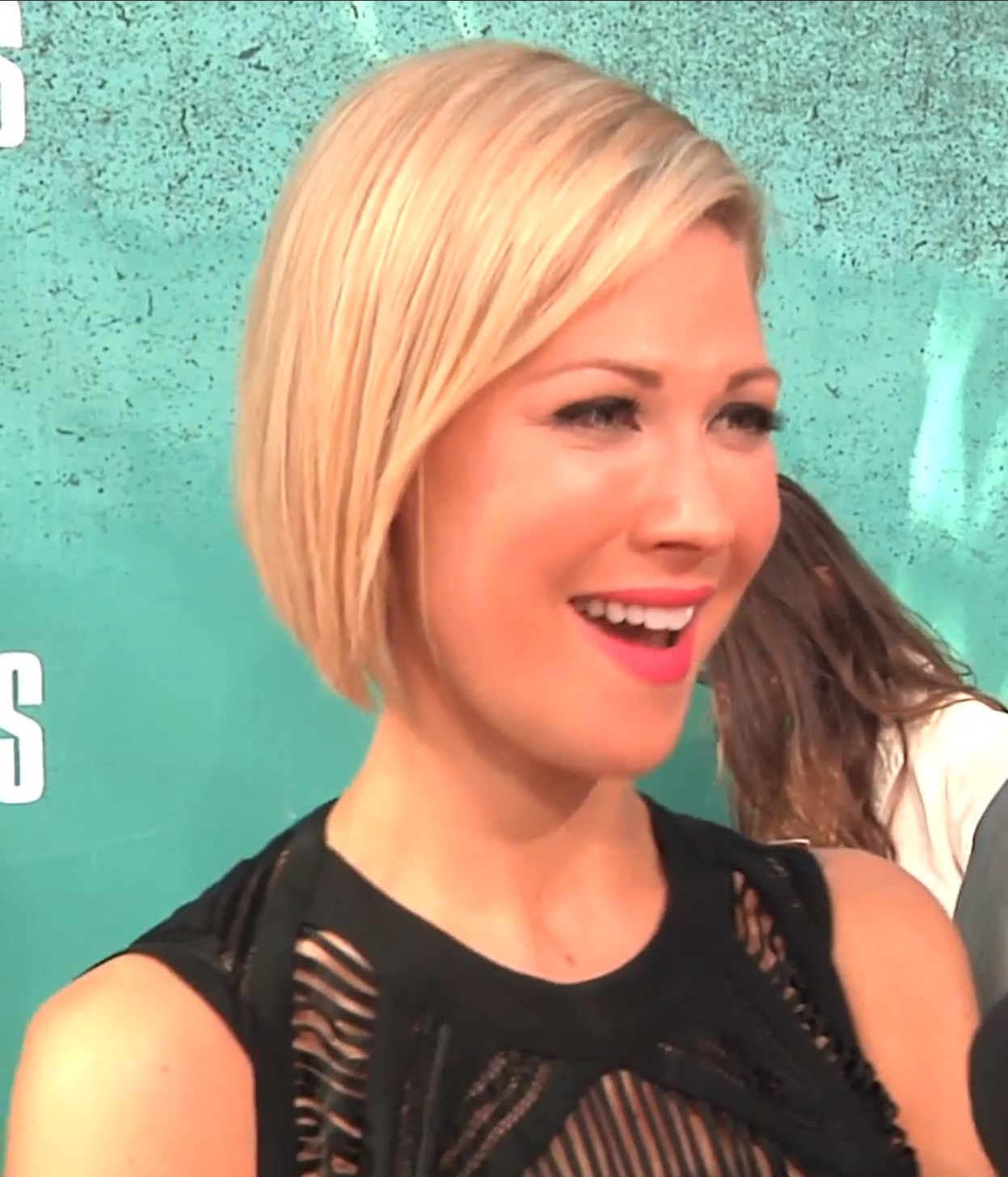
Lydic at the 2012 MTV Movie Awards held at the Gibson Amphitheater in Universal City, California

While on The Daily Show with Trevor Noah, Lydic said she viewed herself as being a comedic actor with "a journalistic responsibility" to the truth, in regard to the serious topics she approaches through a humorous lens, as a correspondent for the show. She created her first one-hour special which aired on May 13, 2019, on Comedy Central, and entitled The Daily Show with Trevor Noah Presents Desi Lydic: Abroad. The special explores how the United States is now further apart in gender equality than many other countries in the world. The special was nominated for a Writers Guild of America Award for Television: Best Comedy/Variety – Specials at the 72nd Writers Guild of America Awards.

After the passing of Supreme Court Justice Ruth Bader Ginsburg, Lydic paid tribute to her work and life in a half-hour special entitled The Daily Show with Trevor Noah Presents: Remembering RBG – A Nation Ugly Cries with Desi Lydic aired on Comedy Central on October 30, 2020. Lydic was among a number of guest hosts of The Daily Show after the departure of Trevor Noah.

== Personal life ==
Lydic has a son, born in late December 2015, with her husband Gannon Brousseau. While filming her Comedy Central special Abroad, Lydic got a "small upside-down triangle tattoo representing female empowerment" as a commemoration of her time spent with Icelandic all-female rap collective Daughters of Reykjavík, marking her as the "23rd member" of the group.

== Filmography ==
=== Film ===
Year	Title	Role	Notes
2001	Not Another Teen Movie	Cutie #2	Uncredited
2003	Legally Blonde 2: Red, White & Blonde	Delta Nu Sister	
2004	Adventures in Vegas	Desi/Skyler	Short film
2007	Stand Up	Veronica	
2007	Out at the Wedding	Jeannie	
2008	Screw Cupid	Betty	
2008	Big Heart City	Rita/Jane	
2009	As Advertised	Ronnie	TV film
2009	Stan Helsing	Mia	
2010	Darnell Dawkins: Mouth Guitar Legend	Helena	
2011	Poolboy: Drowning Out the Fury	Diana Torres	
2011	We Bought a Zoo	Shea Seger (Lasagna Mom)	
2012	The Babymakers	Julie	
2012	Something Like a Butterfly	Joyce Humphrey	Short film
2020	Irresistible	Fox News Anchor	
2022	Mr. Oberbeck	Ally Pearson	Short film
2024	Space Cadet	Dr. Stacy Kellogg	

=== Television ===
Year	Title	Role	Notes
2003	What I Like About You	Becky	Episode: "No More Mr. Nice Guy"
2004	Complete Savages	Woman #1	Episode: "Savage XXX-mas"
2005	CSI: NY	Elaine Curtis	Episode: "Recycling"
2005	Invasion Iowa	Gryffyn Greene	5 episodes
2006	Pepper Dennis	Melinda	Episode: "Poker Clubs and Boob Cams - Film at Eleven"
2008	Dog Whisperer with Cesar Millan	Herself	Episode: "Spoiled Rotten"
2010	The League	Waitress	Episode: "The Marathon"
2010	Two and a Half Men	Veronica	Episode: "Chocolate Diddlers or My Puppy's Dead"
2011	Traffic Light	Renee	Episode: "Where the Heart Is"
2011–2016	Awkward	Valerie Marks	Main role; guest (season 5)
2012	Raising Hope	Uma	Episode: "Sabrina's New Jimmy"
2012	The Client List	Dee Ann	7 episodes
2012	How to Be a Gentleman	Chelsea	Episode: "How to Be Shallow"
2013	Dads	Joan	Episode: "Dad Abuse"
2014	Good Luck Charlie	Susan	Episode: "Down a Tree"
2014	Friends with Better Lives	Jess	Episode: "Window Pain"
2015	The Odd Couple	Kim	Episode: "The Blind Leading the Blind Date"
2015–present	The Daily Show	Correspondent, Host	
2019	Desi Lydic: Abroad	Herself	TV special
