= Grace Kuhlenschmidt =

American comedian (born 1995)

- Born: June 30, 1995 (age 31)
- Education: Skidmore College
- Occupations: Comedian; actress; television personality
- Years active: 2020–present

Grace Kuhlenschmidt (born June 30, 1995) is an American comedian, actress, and television personality. Since 2023, she has been a correspondent on The Daily Show.

== Early life and career ==
Kuhlenschmidt grew up in Pacific Palisades, Los Angeles. She attended St. Matthew's Episcopal School and Marymount High School. She later moved to Saratoga Springs, New York, to attend Skidmore College, where she studied psychology. While in college, she participated in an improv group and a sketch comedy group.

She lived in Chicago from 2017 to 2020, before moving to New York City. During the COVID-19 pandemic, she gained a following by posting on TikTok. In 2023, she made her debut as a correspondent on The Daily Show.

== Personal life ==
Kuhlenschmidt is a lesbian.

== Filmography ==
=== Television ===
Year	Title	Role	Notes	Ref.
2021	Ziwe	Melodia	Episode: "Immigration"	
2022	Search Party	Pepper	7 episodes	
2022	Killing It	Airport coworker	Episode: "Desperate Measures"	
2023–present	The Daily Show	Herself	Correspondent; recurring	
2025	Adults	Taryn	Episode: "Theracide"	

=== Film ===
Year	Title	Role	Ref.
2023	Molli and Max in the Future	Triangulon	
2024	Boys Go to Jupiter	Freckles	

=== Music videos ===
Year	Title	Artist	Role	Ref.
2023	"Every F*cking Time"	Claud	Self	
