= Michael Kosta =

American stand-up comedian

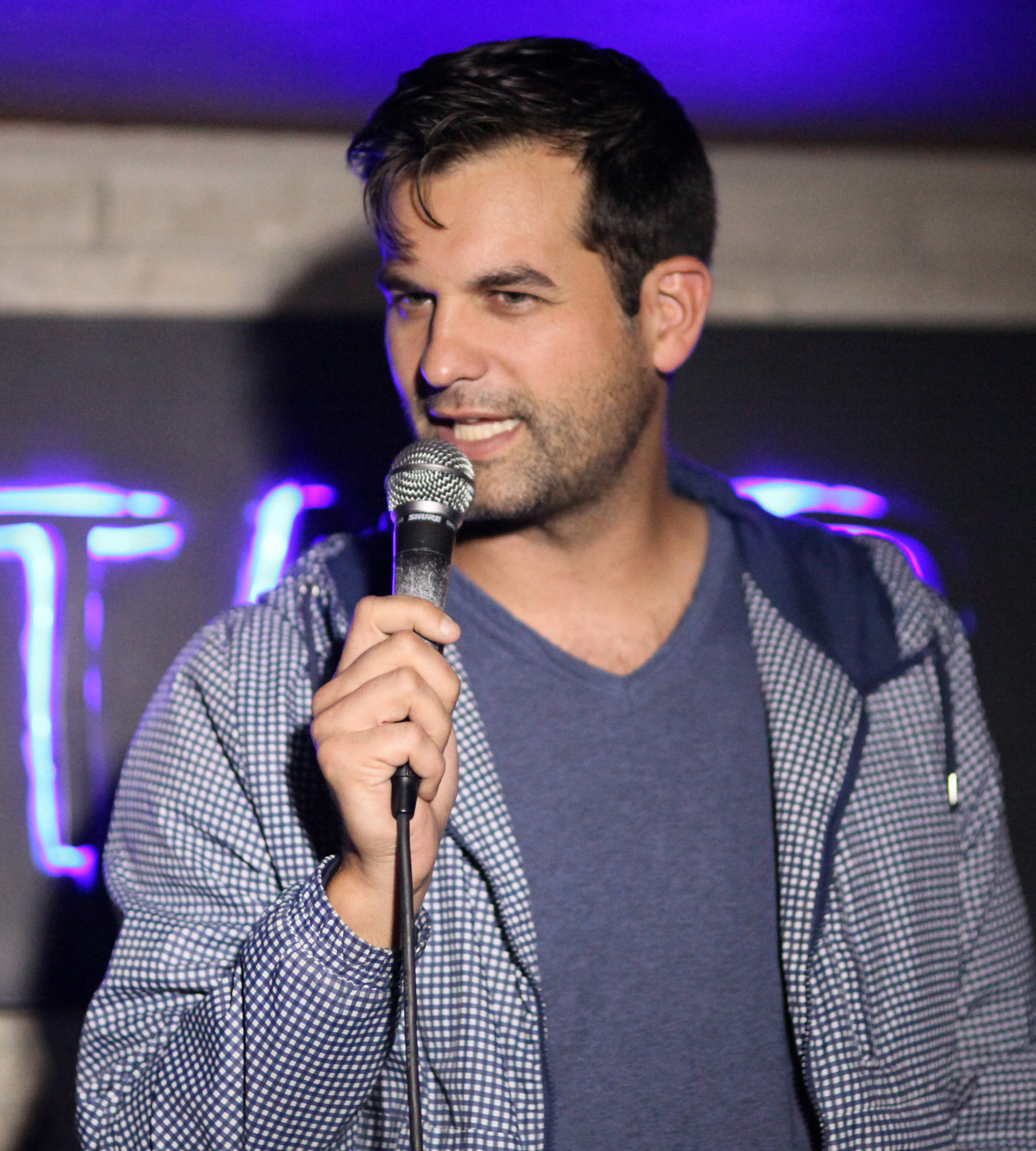
- Kosta in June 2017
- Born: September 27, 1979 (age 47); Ann Arbor, Michigan, U.S.
- Education: University of Illinois Urbana-Champaign (BA)
- Occupations: Comedian; actor
- Years active: 2005–present
- Children: 2
- Tennis career
- Country (sports): United States
- Height: 6 ft 4 in (1.93 m)
- Turned pro: 2002
- Retired: 2004
- Plays: Right-handed (two-handed backhand)

Singles
- Career record: 14-16
- Career titles: 0
- Highest ranking: 864

Doubles
- Career record: 12-13
- Highest ranking: 501
- Website: michaelkosta.com

Michael Kosta (born September 27, 1979) is an American stand-up comedian and former professional tennis player. He is an Emmy award-winning rotating host and senior correspondent of The Daily Show and was hired as a correspondent in 2017. He was the most-watched guest host in 2023. He has also hosted The Comment Section for the E! Network with producer Joel McHale as well as co-hosting Fox Sports 1's Crowd Goes Wild. His one-hour stand-up special for Comedy Central debuted in 2020.

== Early life ==
Kosta was born and raised in Ann Arbor, Michigan, and went to Huron High School before attending the University of Illinois Urbana-Champaign, where he played on four Big Ten Championship tennis teams. In spite of his Greek-sounding surname, he is not of Greek descent, and believes his ancestors were Ukrainian. This was revealed when Michael Kosta was a guest on the show Late Night with Seth Meyers. After earning a bachelor's degree in Speech Communications in 2002, Kosta played tennis on the ITF and ATP tour for two years before being hired as the Assistant Men's Tennis Coach for the University of Michigan. While he was the assistant coach, he began to explore his interest in stand-up comedy and performed at local comedy clubs on the side. In 2005, Kosta began a full-time job as a stand-up comic based in Los Angeles. He also did stand-up comedy in Australia in 2010.

== Career ==
=== Stand-up comedy ===
Kosta has had major appearances on The Tonight Show with Jay Leno, Conan, Chelsea Lately, and Late Night with Seth Meyers as well as a half-hour Comedy Central special called Comedy Central Presents: Michael Kosta, in January 2011. He has also made appearances on TruTV's World's Dumbest, performed at the HBO Comedy Festival in Aspen, and at the Just for Laughs Festival in Montreal. Kosta also shot a pilot with Comedy Central called Overloaded with Michael Kosta in fall 2011, but as of October 2012, it has not been broadcast. In 2013, Kosta filmed his own mini-sitcom for network TV under the auspices of FOX's Shortcom Comedy Hour with fellow comedians Neal Brennan, Dov Davidoff, Kevin Smith, and Ali Wong. In 2015, Kosta released his first comedy album on Comedy Dynamics Records, Comedy For Attractive People. Kosta released his one-hour Comedy Central Stand-up Special, Michael Kosta: Detroit. NY. LA. in 2022.

=== On TV ===
Kosta has hosted several TV shows:

- Correspondent on The Daily Show with Trevor Noah
- Fox Sports Detroit show, CCHA: All Access won two Michigan Emmys for Outstanding Host in a TV Series (2011)
- Backstage host of the 63rd Primetime Emmy Awards "Backstage Live", on Emmy.com (2011)
- Co-host of Attack of the Show! and the Next Day T.J. Miller (T.J. Miller on Hosting Comedy Central's "Mash Up")
- Featured comedian on E!'s The Soup Investigates, where he led the segment "Spoilers in the Streets"
- Catch on NBC (2014)
- Co-host of Fox Sports 1 daytime talk show Crowd Goes Wild
- Co-producer and host of The Comment Section on The E! Network
- Host of seasons one and two of Warm & Fuzzy on the Tennis Channel
- Guest on The Joe Rogan Experience
- Guest host on The Daily Show (week of October 16, 2023 and February 26, 2024)
- Rotating co-host of The Daily Show since 2024

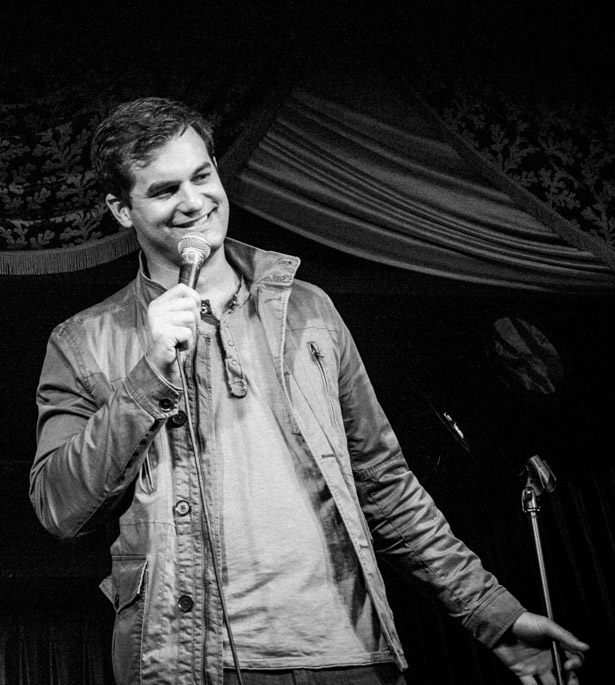
Kosta in 2016

=== Tennis ===
Kosta played tennis on the ITF and ATP tour for two years before being hired as the Assistant Men's Tennis Coach for the University of Michigan. He formerly ranked #864 in the world tennis ranking. He currently hosts his own podcast, Tennis Anyone, which covers tennis, politics, and life.

=== Book ===
Kosta released a memoir about his life and career, Lucky Loser: Adventures in Tennis and Comedy, published by Harper Influence in 2025.

== Personal life ==
Kosta is married and has two daughters and a dog named Walter, as he has mentioned in interviews and in his book.
