= Miss Fag Hag Pageant =

The Miss Fag Hag Pageant is a pageant contest for fag hags, referring to women who either associate mostly or exclusively with gay and bisexual men, or have gay and bisexual men as close friends.

== Origin ==
The concept of Miss Fag Hag Pageant originated in Wellington, New Zealand, in 2007 and was first held in January 2008 as a search for the best fag hag. It was later emulated by gay bars in other New Zealand cities including Christchurch, Hamilton, and Auckland, and later in Melbourne, Australia, and New York, USA.

The idea was created by Wellington nightclub and bar owner Greig Wilson. The inaugural winner was 22-year-old Veronica Mills. Miss Fag Hag Wellington 2009 was 21-year-old Nicole Johnston and Miss Fag Hag Wellington 2010 was 20-year-old Courtney Havill.

== Background ==
Fag hag is a gay slang phrase referring to a woman who either associates mostly or exclusively with gay and bisexual men, or has gay and bisexual men as close friends. The phrase originated in gay male culture in the United States and was historically an insult. Some women who associate with gay men object to being called fag hags, while others embrace the term. The male counterpart, for men who have similar interpersonal relationships with gay and bisexual men is fag stag, part of hag-ism, the identification of a person with a group—usually united in terms of sexuality, gender identity, or shared sex—of which he or she is not officially a member. People who associate with lesbian, gay, bisexual, and transgender (LGBT) people may be called fruit flies regardless of their sex.

== American Miss Fag Hag Pageant ==
The American event was created by comedian Shawn Hollenbach and produced by Hollenbach and Paul Case as a benefit for Hetrick-Martin Institute and was held at Comix Night Club. The show was staged, choreographed and directed by Adolpho Blaire. According to the event's website, the show is a "celebration of the unsung hero of the gay community".

=== 2009 ===
The first American Miss Fag Hag pageant was held in 2009 in New York City. The New York contestants and their corresponding gay male sponsors were announced on the event's website, www.missfaghag.com. Hosts were Shawn Hollenbach and Paul Case. Judges were Caroline Rhea, Michael Musto, Hedda Lettuce and Katina Corrao. The show was staged, choreographed and directed by Adolpho Blaire. According to the website, the show is a celebration of the unsung hero of the gay community.

Contestants:

Contestants were named after many of the New York City villages and boroughs.

- Miss West Village (winner) Heather Shields
- Miss Hell's Kitchen (1st runner up) Sabra
- Miss Harlem (2nd runner up) Karmen Kluge
- Miss Astoria Tammy Dalton
- Miss Bed-Stuy JQ
- Miss East Village Alisa Vogel
- Miss Jackson Heights Spanques Le Tushh
- Miss Long Island Jennifer Long Island
- Miss Lower East Side Jillian Snow Harris
- Miss Soho Rosemary Zuppardo
- Miss Lawrencetown

Performances:

- Kathy Fitzgerald sang "Gorgeous" from The Apple Tree
- Shayna Steele sang "Lady Marmalade"
- Bridget Everett sang two originals with Kenny Mellman
- Britney Houston danced to her song "And the Crowd Goes"
- Mel & El sang their song, "Fagnet"
- Alysha Umphress sang the opening number "Girl for All Seasons" and "You Make Me Feel (Mighty Real)"

Special guests:

- Nick Adams crowned the winner
- Frank DeCaro, Murray Hill and Jon Wolfe Nelson introduced the talent
- Danny Leary and Jenny Rubin hosted the red carpet for DFD*TV.

=== 2010 ===
New York's Second Annual Miss Fag Hag Pageant was held at Comix NY on Sunday, May 2 at 8pm Miss Fag Hag 2010 was hosted by cabaret duo Mel & El. The judges included Michael Musto, John Cameron Mitchell, Jerry Torre and last minute replacement, Leslie Jordan. Adolpho Blaire directed and choreographed the pageant and produced along with creator, Shawn Hollenbach and co-producer, Paul Case. The 10 contestants competed in the following categories:

- Evening Wear
- Presenting Your Gay in a Swimsuit
- Talent
- Question and Answer
- The Skinnygirl Margarita Online Video Challenge
- Producer Interview

Contestants:

- Miss Bowery (Winner): Tanya O'Debra
- Miss Lower East Side (1st Runner Up): Jillian Snow Harris
- Miss Bushwick (2nd Runner Up): Crystal Clements
- Miss Astoria: Dana Craig
- Miss Harlem: JQ
- Miss Garment District: Amy Beckerman
- Miss Midtown: Chasity Neutze
- Miss Morningside: Michelle Alexandra
- Miss Park Slope: Andrea Alton
- Miss Union Square: Elyse Beyer

Performances:

- Darius De Haas opened the show with "Dreamgirls" with Lexi Lawson and Rebecca Covington.
- Sahara Davenport danced to Beyoncé's version of "Proud Mary."
- Margarita Pracatan sang "Oops!... I Did It Again" and "Mamma Mia"
- Singer/Songwriter Charlene Lite sang "While You Were Sleeping"
- Spangles Dance Company
- Miss Fag Hag 2009, Heather Shields sang "Forever Your Girl" while crowning the winner.

Special guests:

- Abiola Abrams, Billy Eichner, Bailey Hanks, Kate McKinnon, Jon Wolfe Nelson, Judith Regan, Daniel Robinson, and Stephen Wallum introduced talent.
- Bethenny Frankel announced Miss Bowery the winner of the Skinnygirl Margarita Online Video Challenge via video.
