= Undecided (disambiguation) =

"Undecided" is a song by Sid Robins and Charlie Shavers and published in 1938.

Undecided may also refer to:

- "Undecided" (Chris Brown song), 2019
- "Undecided" (Masters Apprentices song), 1966
- "Undecided", a song by Silverchair from Frogstomp, 1995
- The Undecided, a Canadian Christian pop punk band
- Undecided Records, an American independent record label

== See also ==
- Undecided voter
- Unaffiliated (disambiguation)
- Neutral (disambiguation)
- Uncertainty
- Undecidable (disambiguation)
