= Shawn Hollenbach =

American comedian and actor

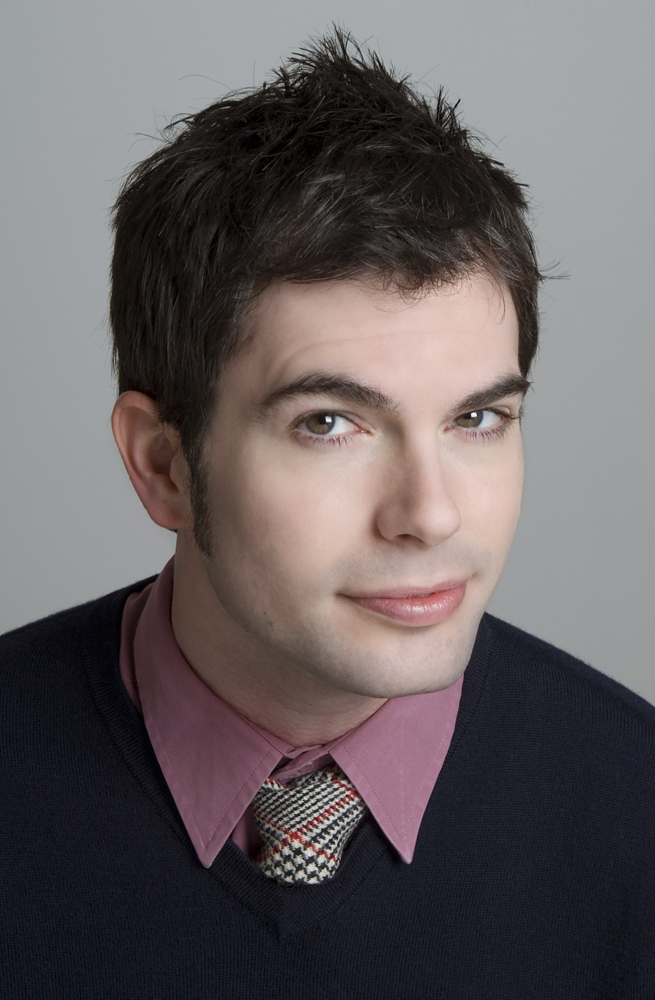
- Born: March 6, 1981 (age 45); Lebanon, Pennsylvania, US
- Occupations: Actor, comedian, writer
- Years active: 1999–present
- Website: ShawnHollenbach.com

Shawn Hollenbach (born March 6, 1981, in Lebanon, Pennsylvania) is an American comedian, writer and actor, based in New York City. He worked at Comedy Central in the programming department. As a comic and actor he has performed around the country and throughout New York. He is an energetic and upbeat performer and self-deprecating humorist focusing on LGBT subjects and a "style that capitalizes on the myriad incidents and accidents that befall us all in the midst of our human existence". He currently works at Logo, Viacom's channel that appeals to the LGBT community and their allies as the social media manager for the channel and its most popular show, RuPaul's Drag Race.

== Personal life ==
He has a twin brother, Eric and a sister, Kristen. He studied Musical Theater at Shenandoah Conservatory of Shenandoah University. He is gay and his act often incorporates comedy about LGBT subjects. He lives in Washington Heights. His mother died in 2004.

== Career ==
One of his first performances was when he was eighteen, "I told a Pantene [a glamour hair product] joke to a bunch of Amish folks at a picnic. That's when I first learned, "Know Your Audience."" He had been doing improv comedy for several years and stand-up seemed the next progression. 2003 saw his first stand-up performance at "Comedy Social" at the Sin Sin club, "I fell in love with the show and they asked us to perform stand up. It was a very warm room and the perfect first time." He has appeared on two episodes of here! TV's Hot Gay Comics as a featured comedian and here! TV's celebrity news webshow Busted as the host.

On December 1, 2007, he appeared at "Saturday Night Underground" a talk/variety evening for World AIDS Day with Michael Arden and Todd Buonopane at the Laurie Beechman Theatre. In March 2008 he was a featured comic at Bill Augustin's "Big Gay Variety Show", a benefit for the N.Y. Civil Liberties Union.

In 2008 he performed nearly every night and was co-producing five shows including "The Back Room", a gay-themed comedy show at Ochi's Lounge in Comix, "The Kevin Murphy Show", a "Straight Bostonian/Japanese/Gay variety show" and "Meat and Potatoes", a show where folks who grew up poor share their experiences with Carolyn Castiglia.

In June 2009 he was a co-host on Logo (TV channel) NewNowNext.com's Gayest Week Ever. He did an episode of here! TV's Hot Gay Comics. He has also appeared on The Frank DeCaro Show and Derek and Romaine on Sirius/XM OutQ Radio, The Joey Reynold's Show and Daniel Nardicio's DList Radio. He regularly performs at other New York venues including Comix comedy club, The People's Improv Theater, Therapy, Stonewall Inn, New York Comedy Club, and Stand-Up NY. He also travels in the Under the Gaydar Comedy Tour with Jackie Monahan, Claudia Cogan and Dave Rubin.

Hollenbach has created and co-produced the first annual Miss Fag Hag Pageant on May 17, 2009, featuring Caroline Rhea, Michael Musto, Hedda Lettuce, Shayna Steele and Frank DeCaro as a benefit for the Hetrick-Martin Institute, home of The Harvey Milk School. The second annual event took place May 2, 2010, again at the Comix Comedy Club.

In June 2009, he did a reading of Matthew Sheridan's Unfinished with Tricia Alexandro and Jim Weitzer. He also performed at "Funny Gays Are Here Again – A Night of Comedy", a benefit for Bob Zuckerman's campaign for city council, if elected Zuckerman would become the first openly LGBT legislator ever elected from Brooklyn. In August 2009 he was part of Robert Keller's inaugural comedy tour "The Manhattan Comedy Project" with Wendy Ho and Paul Case touring Canada and northern US.

In September 2009 he created "Closet Cases," a monthly show at New York City's The Tank where LGBT performers tell their coming out stories on stage. The series became a Time Out NY critic's pick and a "Homo Must" for HX Magazine.

As an actor, he starred with Kathleen Chalfant in the film Second Guessing Grandma, directed by Bob Giraldi based on Eddie Sarfaty's short story.

In January 2010, Hollenbach and the other MintyFresh producers put together "Beverly's Bake Off!", a show of "song, comedy, burlesque and bakegoods", as a benefit for the National LGBT Cancer Network.

In July 2010 he appeared on "[Gay] Comedy Show". In August 2010 he was a featured comedian in "Laugh Out Proud VI" as part of Ottawa's Pride 2010.

In 2011, Shawn started as a contributing writer for gay news and advice blog, 365gay writing the Wednesday Water Cooler and then 365gay's Ask the Wedding Expert. Shawn later joined Rihanna's 777 Tour with other 150 journalists going to 7 countries to play 7 concerts in 7 days for Logo and NewNowNext starting on November 14, 2012 carrying a cardboard cut out of drag queen celebrity, RuPaul to all 7 countries.
