= Decision =

Decision may refer to:

== Law and politics ==
- Judgment (law), as the outcome of a legal case
- Landmark decision, the outcome of a case that sets a legal precedent
- Per curiam decision, by a court with multiple judges

== Books ==
- Decision (novel), a 1983 political novel by Allen Drury
- Decisions, a 1997 poetry collection by Chimamanda Ngozi Adichie

== Sports ==
- Decision (baseball), a statistical credit earned by a baseball pitcher
- Decisions in combat sports
- Decisions (professional wrestling), by which a wrestler scores a point against his opponent

== Film and TV ==
- Decision (TV series), an American anthology TV series
- "Decisions" (Dawson's Creek), a 1998 television episode

== Music ==
=== Albums ===
- Decisions (George Adams and Don Pullen album), 1984
- Decisions (The Winans album), 1987
- Decided (mixtape) by YoungBoy Never Broke Again, 2018

=== Songs ===
- "Decisions" (song), by Borgore featuring Miley Cyrus
- "Decisions", song by The Expression Tom Haran 1983
- "Decisions", song by Van McCoy 1979
- "Decision", a song by Busta Rhymes from the album Back on My B.S.

== Other ==
- Decision-making
- Decision support system
- Decision theory
- Julio and Marisol, a 1990s AIDS public service campaign officially titled Decision.

== See also ==
- The Decision (disambiguation)
- Decide (disambiguation)
- Decidable (disambiguation)
- Indecision (disambiguation)
