= Decider =

Decider may refer to:

- Decider (website), a pop culture website operated by the New York Post
- Bill Maher: The Decider, a stand-up comedy special
- Decider (Turing machine), a Turing machine that eventually halts for every input
- "The Decider", a recurring segment on The Daily Show
- "The Decider", an episode of the TV series Bluey
- "The Decider", an issue of Tales of the Teenage Mutant Ninja Turtles
- Posek (Hebrew for "decider"), a type of Jewish legal scholar
- Roger (American Dad!), from American Dad!, was led to believe he was "The Decider"

== See also ==
- Decide (disambiguation)
