= Fag stag =

Heterosexual male who enjoys company of gay men

Fag stag and fruit fly are slang terms for a heterosexual man who either enjoys or prefers the company of, or simply has numerous friends who are, gay or bisexual people.

Both terms include derogatory terms for homosexuals (fag and fruit).

The term, which originated in the United States in the 1990s, is the male equivalent of the more common slang term "fag hag", a term which is part of hag-ism: the identification of a person with a group—usually united in terms of sexuality, gender identity, or shared sex—of which they are not a member.

The term can be used as a pejorative or as a term of endearment within LGBTQ communities.

== Usage ==
The colloquialism is used, albeit rarely, primarily within the LGBTQ communities.

Mainstream shows, such as Queer Eye for the Straight Guy, Queer as Folk, Will & Grace and others, often explore the mainstreaming of friendships where differing sexualities play a complement rather than impediment to friendships and social situations.

In addition, homophobia has become less prevalent, and efforts to confront violence and hostility towards sexual and gender minorities, such as gay–straight alliance, has helped lift some of the stigma attached to having LGBTQ people as close friends.

A 2002 episode of the MTV series Undressed was titled "Fag Stag" and centered on a gay wedding.

When Radar magazine debuted, its founder and editor-in-chief, Maer Roshan, called competitor Details' editor-in-chief Dan Peres a "professional fag stag", stating, "Let's get one thing straight, Peres is not gay. But his magazine sure seems to be."

In regards to heterosexual males, the term fag stag is not to be confused with the term gay icon. The term gay icon is used for a celebrity (gay or straight) who is highly regarded by the gay community. While one can be both a fag stag and a gay icon concurrently, the terms are not synonymous.

== See also ==
- Fag hag
- Non-LGBTQ patronage of LGBTQ venues
- Straight ally
