= Indecision =

Indecision may refer to:

- Indecision (band), a 1990s hardcore punk band from the United States
- A series of special television programs on American elections on the Comedy Central channel including:
  - InDecision 92
  - Comedy Central's Indecision 2000
  - The Daily Show: Indecision 2004
  - The Daily Show: Indecision 2006
  - Comedy Central's Indecision 2008
  - InDecision, a recurring segment and title on The Daily Show
- Indecision, a 2005 novel by American author Benjamin Kunkel
- "Indecision" (Steven Page song)
- "Indecision", a song on the 1979 album Sheep Farming in Barnet by Toyah
- "Indecision", a song on the 2013 extended play Dual by Sampha
- "Indecision", a song on the 2017 extended play A Ghetto Christmas Carol by XXXTentacion
- Indecision, the original name of the Canadian pop group soulDecision

== See also ==
- Decision-making
- Decision (disambiguation)
