= List of The Daily Show recurring segments =

This is a list of recurring segments featured on The Daily Show. This list is incomplete for The Daily Show with Craig Kilborn and The Daily Show with Jon Stewart.

During The Daily Show's first ten years, a significant part of its airtime was devoted to different branded recurring segments, usually hosted by the show's correspondents. After the 2005 launch of The Colbert Report, which was largely made up of different recurring segments, the time devoted to such segments on The Daily Show has declined. Normal commentary segments about ongoing news stories can also have recurring titles to help sort them and talk about continuation.

== Current segments ==
=== Your Moment of Zen (July 22, 1996–present) ===
Your Moment of Zen is a segment that occurs at the close of every show; indeed, it has been part of The Daily Show since the very first episode. Series co-creator and original showrunner Madeleine Smithberg was inspired to create the segment after observing her cat being mesmerized by the nature footage that closed each edition of CBS News Sunday Morning with Charles Kuralt.

Continuing under the same structure throughout its run and regardless of its host (who precedes it with the sign-off message, "Here it is, Your Moment of Zen"), the segment initially featured what Smithberg pitched as "the most disturbing videotape we can possibly find." One early example of that was footage of potato chips frying in vats of Olestra, a fat-free food additive known for having diarrhea and other side effects). More often, the segment features random video related to a news figure or news item discussed during the episode, or out-of-context banter among news anchors and reporters. Sometimes, the Moment will be used as a tribute to a recently-deceased celebrity or prominent figure. Occasionally, Moments of Zen are replaced by musical guests who play out the episode with an additional performance.

List of special Moments of Zen:

- The December 18, 2014 episode of The Daily Show did not end with a Moment of Zen, as it immediately transitioned into the final episode of The Colbert Report, with Jon Stewart giving the Moment of Zen at the end of the Colbert episode.
- At the end of Stewart's final episode on August 6, 2015, he introduced his final Moment of Zen – a live performance by Bruce Springsteen – by saying "Here it is, my Moment of Zen".
- On March 22, 2016, Trevor Noah dedicated the Moment of Zen to Brussels, Belgium and Ankara, Turkey. This was in solidarity with those cities after terrorist attacks had occurred earlier that day in Brussels and earlier that month in Ankara.
- On November 8, 2016, Trevor and The Best F#@king News Team re-created a post-credit scene from the movie The Avengers. This quick parody replaced the usual Moment of Zen.
- On March 2, 2017, Trevor announced that they would be taking Your Moment of Zen suggestions from the viewers with the social media hashtag #DailyShowZen. The first user submitted Moment of Zen aired on March 15, 2017.
- As Trevor cued up Moment of Zen in his last sign-off as host on December 8, 2022, the camera turned to an applauding audience, who joined the show's staff in serenading Trevor with a rendition of Gerry and the Pacemakers' "You'll Never Walk Alone", a song associated with Trevor's favorite soccer club, Liverpool F.C.
- The July 22, 2026 episode, airing 30 years to the night of The Daily Show's premiere, featured a montage of various "Here it is, Your Moment of Zen" introductions from anchors over the show's history.

=== Back in Black with Lewis Black (1996–present) ===
Back in Black with Lewis Black is a popular segment on the show in which comedian and "America's foremost commentator on everything" Lewis Black catches the stories that, according to the anchor's introduction, "fall through the cracks" and comments on them in a humorous rant. The segment, which starts with an opening riff in the style of the AC/DC song "Back in Black", originated in 1996, when Craig Kilborn was still the host of The Daily Show. As of 2026, it is the longest-running recurring segment that still airs on the show, aside from Your Moment of Zen.

=== InDecision/Democalypse ===
Prior to the debut of The Daily Show, Comedy Central produced "InDecision '92", a series of comedy specials parodying NBC News's "Decision" segment which airs during election years. Following a second series of specials in 1996 titled "InDecision '96", "InDecision" became a recurring feature on The Daily Show starting with "InDecision 2000". The segment focuses on election-year topics, from state primaries, the party conventions, the campaign trail, the debates, and election night.

InDecision has featured different variants and titles over the years, including:

- "ReDecision 2003", covering the 2003 California gubernatorial recall election
- "InDecision 2004: Prelude to a Recount", covering the 2004 United States presidential election (and alluding to the Florida recount of four years earlier)
- "InDecision 2044", a segment in which Rob Riggle interviewed kindergarteners to see who was most likely to run for president in 2044
- "Indecision 1425", covering the January and December 2005 Iraqi parliamentary election dated using the Islamic calendar
- "The Road to InDecision 2006" covering the months leading up to the 2006 midterms
- "Indecision 5766", covering the 2006 Israeli legislative election dated using the Hebrew calendar
- "InDecision/InDécision 2006", covering the 2006 Canadian federal election, acknowledging Canada's two official languages
- "InDecision 2008: Clusterf@#k to the White House", covering the early primary season of the 2008 presidential election
- "IranDecision 2009", covering the 2009 Iranian presidential election
- "InDecision 2010: Midterm TeaPartyGanza, When Grizzlies Attack", covering the 2010 United States elections and referencing the Tea Party and Sarah Palin nicknaming conservative mothers as "Mama Grizzlies"
- "Indecision 1776: Ye Cobblestone Road to the White House", covering the 2012 Republican Debates and mocking Tea Party rhetoric
- "A Spot Of InDecision: Clustershag to 10 Downing", covering the 2010 United Kingdom general election
- "Democalypse", used during the mid-2010s in reference to the outstanding amount of Democratic nominees for office at the time
- "Votegasm", used during Trevor Noah's anchor tenure
- "Doomocracy 2024" & "InDecision 2024", covering the 2024 United States presidential election (the former of the two titles was applied to presidential debate coverage late in 2023)

An uncensored version of InDecision 2004 was released on a three-disc DVD box set on June 28, 2005. It includes all episodes from the Democratic and Republican National Conventions, "The Bush-Kerry Debate: The Squabble in Coral Gables", "Election Night 2004: Prelude to a Recount", and highlights from throughout the 2004 presidential election.

=== Jordan Klepper Fingers the Pulse (July 21, 2016–March 21, 2017, 2019–present) ===
Jordan Klepper goes out and talks to different crowds in public. Usually talking to Donald Trump supporters at Trump rallies or events, he asks them questions that highlight the hypocrisy within the group. One segment was dedicated to talking to the inhabitants of Dick Street, New Jersey.

The segment continued after the 2016 President Election, since President Trump continued to hold campaign rallies all over the United States of America.

The segment returned in late 2019 when Klepper returned to the show.

=== Mess O' Potamia/Crisis in Israfghyianonanaq/The Futile Crescent (2003–2015, 2024–present) ===
Mess O' Potamia has been a common part of the show since the early days of the 2003 invasion of Iraq. Like "Indecision ####", the title is merely used to specify the topic of the jokes, which focus on the troubles in the Mesopotamia region.

In August 2006, Stewart announced that the Mess O' Potamia segment had been renamed "The Futile Crescent". Then, in December 2006, Stewart created a spin-off of the segment, this one entitled "Mess O' Potomac", to coincide with the release of the final report from the Iraq Study Group.

The final segment of Mess O'Potamia aired in March 2009, shortly after Barack Obama assumed office. Although the Iraq War persisted, the clip was entitled "Mess O'Potamia – The Iraq War Is Over". However, on June 12, 2014, Jon Stewart announced, "Looks like we're going to have to return to our old coverage" and resurrected the old Mess O'Potamia segment.

Crisis in Israfghyianonanaq is an alternative name for the "Mess O' Potamia" segment. Originally used in 2006, it focuses on problems in the Middle East. The title is a portmanteau of the names of (in order) Israel, Afghanistan, Syria, Lebanon, Iran and Iraq.

The segment returned as "The Futile Crescent" on February 26, 2024, though it would regain its original name from March 2, 2026 onward (with the subtitle "America's Next Top Muddle") as it focused on the Iran war.

=== In My Opinion (November 22, 2023-present) ===
Much like Lewis Black's "Back in Black," In My Opinion features a guest commentator opining on a certain topic. Instead of utilizing just one commentator, however, the segment has featured various voices making a special appearance, including previous TDS guest hosts John Leguizamo, Leslie Jones, and Charlamagne tha God, as well as Ricky Velez, Nick Offerman, and Laverne Cox.

=== Sports War (May 15, 2024-present) ===
Sports War finds two TDS correspondents arguing over developments in the world of sports. Unlike the previous "I Apologize for Talking While You Were Talking" and its homage to Pardon the Interruption, here money is also on the debaters' minds, as they offer viewers humorous spread betting lines on possible outcomes (the segment is literally "brought to you by Gambling") in addition to talking brashly about the topics and each other.

== Past recurring Noah-era segments ==
=== Today's Future Now (October 7, 2015 – May 16, 2017) ===
Today's Future Now is a segment hosted by correspondent Ronny Chieng, which takes a look at and reviews technological trends. The first segment, airing on October 7, 2015, was Chieng's debut on The Daily Show as a correspondent.

The segment has reviewed tech such as virtual reality, artificial intelligence, smart technology and flying cars.

=== What the Actual Fact (November 11, 2015 – January 23, 2017) ===
What the Actual Fact is a fact-checking segment, usually analysing speeches from political figures or events.

The segment is hosted by Desi Lydic (once with Jessica Williams) and involves her standing in-front of a screen. A clip/soundbite is shown where a politician is making a statement that is false (or is misleading in some way). Desi then deconstructs the lie and gives it a humorous rating on a joke scale.

On January 23, 2017, the segment reviewed the Trump Administrations first press briefing. Due to the Kellyanne Conway's gaffe about alternative facts, the segment was renamed What The Alternative Fact. In this segment, Lydic went through and satirically and sarcastically rated all of Trump's falsehoods as true, by justifying them with "alternative facts".

=== Livin' on the Street (January 20, 2016 – April 21, 2016) ===
Livin' on the Street is a segment hosted by Hasan Minhaj where he parodies 'Wall Street Executives' & financial commercials and talks about money, stocks & economy. Hasan plays a character who gives technically viable yet crazy-sounding advice, who also has financial & family problems.

=== Tales from the Trump Archive (March 10, 2016 – May 26, 2016) ===
Tales from the Trump Archive (also known as The Chronicles of Narcissism: Tales from the Trump Archive) was a segment that aired during the 2016 Republican primaries that took a deeper look into the history of Republican presidential candidate Donald Trump.

The segment was hosted by Trevor Noah and had 3 segments where the show would examine sound bites and videos of the statements made by Donald Trump that aren't getting too much media coverage.

The first segment, airing on March 10, took a look at a Donald Trump interview with The New York Times from 1999. In this segment, Trevor shows a bunch of clips of middle class people explaining why they want a rich businessman to be in office and even shows a clip of Trump saying that he loves poor people. They then contrast that notion with Trump saying, in 1999, that "My entire life, I've watched politicians bragging about how poor they are, how they came from nothing, how poor their parents and grandparents were. And I said to myself, if they can stay so poor for so many generations, maybe this isn't the kind of person we want to be electing to higher office. How smart can they be? They're morons."

The second segment, airing on April 5, talks about Donald Trump's 1994 interview on Lifestyles of the Rich and Famous. In the clip, he's being interviewed alongside his first second wife (Marla Maples). In the interview, Trump talks lewdly and sexually about his daughter (who was one year old at the time of the interview) Tiffany Trump. This is in contrast to Trump's claim that "nobody has more respect for women than" him.

The third segment, airing on May 26, examines a 1994 interview where Donald Trump discusses how he didn't like that his former wife (Maples) worked.

=== How the F**k We Got Here (March 21, 2016 – March 23, 2016) ===
How The F**k We Got Here was a two-part segment by Trevor Noah that looked at the causes of Donald Trump's GOP nomination. In other words, "How did Donald Trump go from being the guy who fake-fired people on TV to the orange-tinted terror?"

=== 2016 Daily Show Summer Games (August 8, 2016 – August 18, 2016) ===
Usually right before the start of an episode, this segment was a parody of 2016 Summer Olympics commentators. This segment was used to satirically portray the news that was coming out of Rio de Janeiro, Brazil. It also joked about issues that occurred at the 2016 Rio Summer Olympics, such as the Zika virus epidemic, the swimming pools turning green and the Ryan Lochte scandal.

Sometimes it was used to make fun of the 'mental gymnastics' that politicians & pundits used in order to spin certain stories. Notably, it mocked Donald Trump supporters of constantly flip-flopping on their defence of their candidate.

Hosted by Roy Wood Jr. and Jordan Klepper (once with Roy Wood Jr. & Ronny Chieng) as commentators, sometimes with a Trevor Noah cameo as a participant.

=== Outrage Court (September 13, 2016 – October 12, 2016) ===
A pre-recorded sketch-based segment where Roy Wood Jr. is a judge who listens to two attorneys argue about a certain issue, taking place in Outrage Court. The attorneys are Jordan Klepper and Desi Lydic, who take a different position on topics such as "trigger warnings" and appropriate ways to protest.

The segment ends with Roy Wood Jr. accepting valid points from both stances and dismissing any invalid points.

=== Black Eye on America (October 20, 2016 – April 3, 2017) ===
Roy Wood Jr. talks about issues through an African-American perspective. The segments consist of short, quick interviews with African-Americans who have knowledge on the issue, as well as examples of how that certain issue affects black Americans.

The first segment of Black Eye on America talks about the struggles that black journalists have when discussing race issues on television. It talks about how and why they have to keep calm, and shows examples of non-black anchors making racist remarks towards these black journalists.

The second segment looks at the phenomenon known as "Black Twitter".

=== Who Is the Real President? (February 6, 2017 – April 4, 2017) ===
In the first months after Donald Trump became President of the United States, Trevor Noah analyses White House characters who might even be more powerful than Trump himself. In this segment, Trevor has pondered if the real President is Senior Advisor Steve Bannon, news company Fox News or Trump's son-in-law Jared Kushner.

=== The Yearly Show (December 17, 2015–December 18, 2018) ===
On the show's last episode of the year, Trevor Noah and The Best F#@king News Team review the previous year's biggest news story and trends.

=== Third Month Mania (March 17, 2016–) ===
A parody of March Madness, with a bracket filled with other topics instead of basketball teams. Third Month Mania is an annual segment that airs weekly segments throughout March and April. Voting happens on thirdmonthmania.com.

For the first annual Third Month Mania, viewers could vote on what made them the "maddest". Choices included "Slow WiFi" vs "No WiFi", "AntiVaxxers" vs "Hipsters", etc. Hosted by Hasan Minhaj and Roy Wood Jr., the correspondents over-hyped the results and bracket changes poking fun at March Madness commentators. The official description from thirdmonthmania.com; "Third Month Mania looks at all the important (and trivial) things that make you angry, then pits them against each other in a bracket where your vote actually matters. This single-elimination tournament takes place mostly in the month after February and is in no way connected to college athletics".

By the end of Third Month Mania 2016, after 4.4 million votes, the winner for most maddening thing were Trump Supporters.

For the second annual Third Month Mania, viewers could vote on which Donald Trump tweet is the greatest. The bracket was broken up into 4 sections: "Celebs", "Enemies", "Government Affairs" and "WTF".

=== Profiles in Tremendousness (November 30, 2016–) ===
In this segment, Trevor Noah takes a look at Donald Trump's Administration Cabinet nominees. Trump is known for bragging about picking "the best people" and "draining the swamp", so The Daily Show checks if his picks live up to his promise.

Noah checks financial ties, history, scandals, accomplishments, etc. of the people Trump has appointed. He often looks at what Trump has previously said about that person and checks whether or not Trump has been consistent with his attitude towards them. He also analyses their performance at confirmation hearings. The title of the segment refers to the 1957 Pulitzer Prize-winning biographical book Profiles in Courage.

The segments have profiled at Trump's Attorney General Jeff Sessions, Secretary of the Treasury Steven Mnuchin, National Security Advisor Michael T. Flynn, Secretary of Housing and Urban Development Ben Carson, Secretary of Education Betsy DeVos, Press Secretary Sean Spicer, Supreme Court Nominee Neil Gorsuch, Senior Adviser Stephen Miller, White House Communications Director Anthony Scaramucci and Treasury Secretary Steven Mnuchin.

On August 28, 2017, a special "Pardon Edition" of the segment looked into the recently pardoned former sheriff Joe Arpaio.

=== Moscow in the Meddle (January 9, 2017–) ===
A segment dedicated to the stories that involve President Donald Trump and Russia, such as the Donald Trump-Russia dossier and the Russian interference in the 2016 elections.

=== Ain't Nobody Got Time for That (March 2017–) ===
In the segment, Noah summarizes news that should get significant media attention, but are overshadowed by other breaking news that constantly appear every day.

=== I Apologize for Talking While You Were Talking (January 2018–) ===
Roy Wood, Jr. and Michael Kosta (though, in one segment, Ronny Chieng filled in for Kosta, and in another, Jaboukie Young-White filled in for Wood) co-host this segment dedicated to sports news. The segment's title is a spoof of ESPN sports talk show Pardon the Interruption.

=== CP Time with Roy Wood Jr. (February 2018–) ===
Roy Wood, Jr. hosts this segment while wearing a fake grey mustache and horn-rimmed glasses. This segment is dedicated to African-American history. The motto of the segment is, "Remember, we're for the culture." The title is a reference to the slang "Colored people's time".

=== Everything Is Stupid (June 2018–) ===
Ronny Chieng hosts this segment, providing commentary on ridiculous trends in the news such as Fortnite, luxurious doghouses, and adventure playgrounds.

=== Trevor Noah: Racism Detective (January 2019–December 2022) ===
A brief segment where after a person that is the focus of the story does something very characteristic of racism, prompting the question "Is he racist?" Noah turns to "Trevor Noah: Racism Detective", which is Noah dressed as a 1930s gumshoe in a black and white office simply confirming the person's racism.

=== World War D (January 2019–) ===
A segment focused on the Democratic Presidential Candidates seeking to win the Democratic nomination to run against Donald Trump in 2020.

=== F**k These Animals (February 2019–) ===
Noah, posing as his Australian cousin "Australian Trevor", would provide commentary on stories involving animals.

=== Commander in Beef (May 2019–) ===
A segment focusing on Donald Trump's petty Twitter feud at the moment.

=== The Magical, Wonderful Road to Impeachment (September 25, 2019–present) ===
A segment that covers the impeachment inquiry against Donald Trump. Originally titled The Fantastic Absolutely Tremendous Road to Impeachment.

=== Is This How We Die? (March 2, 2020–2022) ===
A segment covering the COVID-19 pandemic.

=== A Ray of Sunshine (April 2020–2022) ===
Introduced on The Daily Social Distancing Show as an introductory segment showing some good news during the COVID-19 pandemic.

== Past recurring Stewart-era segments ==
Here is a list of past recurring segments from mostly the era in which Jon Stewart hosted the show, in alphabetical order:

=== 10 F#@king Years ===
10 F#@king Years is a segment that was featured on the show throughout 2006, to celebrate the show's tenth anniversary. The segment usually features host Jon Stewart offering a nostalgic look back at the show's past segments (normally spanning Stewart's run as host), usually focusing on a specific theme. The segment debuted on July 17, 2006, around the time of the show's actual anniversary. The segment continued on until the end of 2006, when the anniversary was over.

=== Are You Prepared?!? ===
Are You Prepared?!? was a segment that debuted on the show on May 16, 2006, featuring Samantha Bee. Focusing on preparedness for a potential disaster or bad situation, the segment was styled as a parody of the scare tactics used by sensationalist news shows. In the segment, the correspondent normally travelled around in a large van with the words "Are You Prepared?!?" on its side, often knocking on doors of unsuspecting residents and "testing their preparedness" in the given scenario. Bee performed the segment two times, with her husband, correspondent Jason Jones hosting an installment on November 9, 2006.

=== Even Stevphen ===
Even Stevphen was a segment that was an in-studio debate about a current topic between correspondents Steve Carell and Stephen Colbert. They would often spend the time insulting each other instead, sometimes resulting in one of them breaking down in tears, due to painful childhood memories. It is very similar to the show's earlier segment, "Backfire".

The segment's name is a composite of the two correspondents' homophonic first names, sometimes appearing as Even Stephven or Even Stepvhen (the ph and v appear superimposed on top of each other in the segment's opening graphic). The segment's debut, on September 20, 1999, is the source of the two soundbites used in the most frequent incarnation of the segment's opening graphic: Carell's "You just made me vomit in my own mouth!" and Colbert's "What's the weather like up your own ass?"

The segment was discontinued when Steve Carell left the show, after a brief one-off take featuring Ed Helms (Carell's The Office co-star) as Colbert's debate partner, in which Helms deliberately demonstrated that he was incapable of grasping the premise of the segment. On September 19, 2006, a montage of the best of "Even Stevphen" was shown as part of The Daily Show's "10 F#@king Years".

The segment was revived on the July 7, 2010 episode of The Colbert Report, when Carell was the guest. They debated how uncomfortable the interview was for them, leading into both insulting each other for bad career decisions, and ending with both men crying and a surprise appearance by Jon Stewart who begged the two to answer how they were able to leave the show.

It was revived again on the May 13, 2024 episode of The Late Show with Stephen Colbert. Carell is a guest for Colbert's 60th birthday and they both argue about advantages and disadvantages of getting older.

=== A Tale of Survival ===
A Tale of Survival was a segment that was always done by correspondent Vance DeGeneres, in which he would present a feature done in the style of a Dateline NBC report. In it, a trivial incident was reported as if it were quite dangerous and serious, such as the time the pork chop a man was preparing caught fire and distressed his pet parrot. Between pre-filmed portions, Vance would appear in the studio hiding behind various set-decorations or apparatuses, describing the events in greater frightful detail. Unlike other Daily Show pieces, this one would be divided by a commercial break to accentuate the anticlimactic aspect. The segment first appeared in or around 1999 and was discontinued when Vance DeGeneres left the show in 2001.

=== Ad Nauseam ===
Ad Nauseam was a segment in which its host played various clips of television advertisements and then made fun of them. The original host of the segment was Michael Blieden until 1999. Steve Carell was the host from 1999 to 2002, but when he left the show for his movie and television career, correspondent Ed Helms began to take his place starting in 2002. The segment was discontinued around 2003.

It bears some resemblance to the "Ad Absurdum" segment on the CBC's Royal Canadian Air Farce.

=== The Decider ===
The Decider was an animated segment done in the style of a comic book. The segment's main character was President George W. Bush as the superhero The Decider. The segment originated when Bush made a comment referring to himself as "the decider" during a press conference on April 18, 2006. The Decider was only featured on the show three times, with its first appearance on April 19, 2006 (the day after Bush's use of the term). The Decider made an additional appearance on May 18, 2006. After a hiatus of two years, the segment was featured for the third and final on the June 19, 2008 episode, with an additional twist — The Decider had now become The Procastinator.

=== Diagnosis ===
Diagnosis: was a segment that occurred twice, as "Diagnosis: Mystery" and "Diagnosis: Science." "Mystery" was hosted by Jason Jones in the guise of a medical interest piece, exploring cures for homosexuality. "Science" was hosted by Rob Riggle, exploring how cloning animals will affect food choices.

=== Digital Watch ===
Digital Watch was a segment hosted by Ed Helms and focused on new technology. The segment began sometime around February 2003 and was discontinued sometime around the Summer of 2004.

=== Dollars and "Cents" ===
Dollars and "Cents" was a segment where two hosts discuss economics and give financial advice. It ridiculed the format of financial news shows and included a stock ticker and a bug in the left corner saying "MSTDSFN", mimicking the names and logos of MSNBC and CNN FN.

The hosts and format varied somewhat. When it premiered in early 2000 it was hosted by Steve Carell and Vance DeGeneres, with Nancy Walls reporting from the stock exchange as a "Money Bunny". The "Money Bunny" was usually treated poorly by the two male hosts who would make jokes at her expense. After DeGeneres left, he was replaced by Mo Rocca. Eventually, other correspondents would appear in the rotating spots as "Host" and "Money Bunny" such as Miriam Tolan, Matt Walsh, Campbell Smith, Lauren Weedman and Ed Helms. Dollars and "Cents" was last seen in 2002 when Rob Corddry was reporting from its news desk.

=== Exper-teasers ===
Exper-teasers was hosted by resident expert John Hodgman, debuting on August 24, 2006. The segment was pre-recorded and featured Hodgman, as the show's "Resident Expert", discussing a different topic each week from a room full of books. Samantha Bee was the voice over announcer for the segment's introduction. In each segment, a question appeared on-screen and Hodgman addressed the subject, often using doctored-up photos and other humorous visual aides. Hodgman ended each segment by saying "I'm John Hodgman, and you're welcome." While the "Exper-teasers" segment only appeared twice, Hodgman continues to appear on the show as the Resident Expert.

=== Great Moments in Punditry As Read By Children ===
Great Moments in Punditry As Read By Children was a segment that featured small children reading transcripts of contentious moments from programs like Crossfire and Hannity and Colmes. The segment was featured prominently between 2004 and 2005 and usually aired as a lead-in to a commercial break.

=== Guantanamo Baywatch ===
A series of segments detailing the treatment of prisoners at the Guantanamo Bay detention camp. It features an in-house correspondent named "Gitmo" (an Elmo hand puppet with an added Islamic beard operated by Stewart in front of a greenscreen) who details his torture and eventual release from Guantanamo, having convinced the authorities he is in fact a Uighur. Stewart voices Gitmo in a style similar to Elmo, but with a Middle Eastern accent.

=== Headlines ===
Headlines was the segment that always opened the show for the first four years that Jon Stewart hosted the show. In the segment, Stewart would focus on the big stories of the day. The segment was abruptly dropped around 2003, and no reason was given. This was one of the three divisions of the show under Stewart's first few years; the others being "Other News" and "This Just In". All three were dropped in 2003. The term is still used on The Daily Show website to categorize videos of a night's leading news story.

=== The Jobbing of America ===
The Jobbing of America was a segment about jobs, hosted by Stephen Colbert.

=== Klassic Kolbert ===
Klassic Kolbert was a segment consisting of a previously aired segment featuring former correspondent Stephen Colbert. The segment first appeared on February 8, 2006, several months after Colbert left The Daily Show to host its spin-off, The Colbert Report.

=== Mark Your Calendar ===
Mark Your Calendar was a segment in which its host went over highlights of the upcoming month. At one particular time, the segment was done on a monthly basis. Mo Rocca originally hosted the segment, Ed Helms hosted it from 2002 to 2003, and Samantha Bee began hosting the segment in 2003. At one point, the segment was known as Mark One's Calendar.

=== Money Talks ===
A segment hosted by contributor John Hodgman focused on financial and wealth issues. Hodgman portrays himself as an incredibly wealthy and successful author who looks down on those poorer than him.

=== Mopinion ===
Mopinion was a commentary segment delivered in a deadpan fashion by Mo Rocca.

=== Other News ===
Other News was the segment that always followed Jon Stewart's "Headlines" segment for the first four years of his stint as host. In the segment, Stewart would focus on the less important stories of the day, which would provide a comedic contrast to the segment "Headlines". The segment was abruptly dropped around 2003, and no reason was given. This was one of the three divisions of the show under Stewart's first few years; the others being "Headlines" and "This Just In". All three were dropped in 2003.

=== Out at the Movies ===
Out at the Movies was a segment hosted by Frank DeCaro who provided the audience with a look at new feature films in-character as a flamboyantly homosexual film critic who can find gay subtext in any film. During his stint on the show, Comedy Central ran yearly extended thirty-minute-long versions of "Out at the Movies" for the Oscars. The segment debuted in 1997 and was one of the show's longest running segments. It was discontinued when Frank DeCaro left the show in 2003.

=== Poll Smoking with Dave Gorman ===
Poll Smoking with Dave Gorman was a segment in which the segment's host, Dave Gorman, credited as the show's Statistical Analyst, presents satirical views of polls and statistics pertaining to current events. In each segment, Gorman pretends not to notice the double-meaning of his segment's title (a reference to fellatio) and makes several accidental jokes involving the title, until the October 5, 2006 segment when Gorman "found out" the meaning of the segment's title and "decided" to go along with it. This segment first appeared on April 27, 2006, and last appeared on October 5, 2006.

Gorman had originally appeared on the show as a guest in December 2001, to promote his book Are You Dave Gorman?. He was hired as a contributor four years later, making him the second contributor to be hired after appearing on the show as a guest to promote his book (after John Hodgman).

=== Produce Pete with Steve Carell ===
Produce Pete was a segment hosted by Steve Carell, in which he gave humorous advice regarding produce, interspersed with comments about his life's own failures. The segment was previously taped and first came about around 2002 or 2003 when Carell became too busy with his movie career to do live segments on the show. This segment would typically air towards the end of the show, right before "Your Moment of Zen". The segment was discontinued when Carell left the show, though it did make a brief reappearance after Carell was "discovered" to have been lost in Iraq.

=== The Seat of Heat ===
The Seat of Heat debuted on the show on September 13, 2006. The segment was featured during the guest interview; Stewart would ask the guest one question thought to be particularly tough to answer. (For example, during an interview with Johnny Knoxville: "Which member of your show will be the first to die and what will his scrotum be stapled to then?"). During the segment, the screen behind Stewart and his guest filled with images of flames. The Seat of Heat was the first regular segment during the guest interview since "Five Questions". However, this segment was short-lived. It was discontinued in November 2006, two days after Stewart jokingly complained to guest Tina Fey that "for some reason, we're married to this bit now."

=== Slimming Down with Steve ===
Slimming Down with Steve was a segment chronicling Steve Carell's character's misguided attempts to lose weight. Among the methods suggested were eating vegetable shortening as a healthier alternative to ice cream (which Carell did in front of Stewart and the audience, to their obvious disgust) and undergoing surgery that apparently left him with open wounds. Humor was also derived from Carell's extremely degrading comments about his own (very exaggerated, if even existent) weight problems, such as, "I've been trying to slim down through diet and exercise, but I still feel like 190 pounds of crap in a 175-pound bag!"–announced with a cheery smile. The segment ran five times in 2001 and featured a cheesy opening sequence with a song whose lyrics, sung by Carell, consisted only of "Slimmin' down with Steve, slimmin' down with Steve!" repeated over and over.

=== Slow News Day ===
Slow News Day was a segment that debuted on the June 13, 2006 episode. The segment was a compilation of news clips, usually from CNN, MSNBC or Fox News, which followed an unusually dull or trivial news event over the course of several hours. The segment was very short and was usually played before going to commercial, with no introduction.

=== This Just In ===
This Just In was the segment that always followed Jon Stewart's "Other News" segment for the first four years of his stint as host. In the segment, Stewart would focus on the breaking stories of the day. This was one of the three divisions of the show under Stewart's first few years, the others being "Headlines" and "Other News." All three were abruptly dropped in 2003, with no reason given.

=== This Week in God ===
Colbert activating the God Machine

This Week in God featured the "God Machine" and a satirical run-down of "everything God did this week", very similar to the earlier Daily Show segment "God Stuff" with John Bloom. The title "The God Machine" itself is a parody of the theatrical device Deus ex machina, which means "God from the Machine" and refers to an almost contrived event that saves the day in a theatrical production.

Stephen Colbert usually did the sketch from 2003 to 2005, though occasionally it was done by other correspondents. Due to the spin-off of The Colbert Report, the sketch was handed off to Rob Corddry in 2005. Said Colbert on the hand-off: "God has an exclusive licensing agreement with The Daily Show. We're trying to get the Devil for our show."

After the July 31, 2006 episode, This Week in God went off the air for three months due to Corddry's departure from the show. On October 19, 2006, "This Week in God" returned, with Samantha Bee taking over as the show's "Senior Religion Correspondent". Bee returned again for the segment's "Christmas Christacular" on December 18, 2006. Correspondent Ed Helms has also filled in for the host of the segment on occasion.

The God Machine normally took the form of a black post with a single large bright red button on its top, surrounded by yellow lining. It had previously appeared as the "God Lever" or the "God Rod." The host would smack the button, and it started flashing an apparently random succession of religiously themed images on a screen behind the host, while making a sound of a high-pitched voice (recorded by Colbert) saying "Beepboopboop beepboopboop boopboop. Beepboopboop beepboopboop boopboop. Beep. Boop. Boop". The images and the sound slowed down toward the end, with humorous or ironic last few images (such as Captain Morgan, Snuggle the Bear, Toad or Colbert himself) appearing before the screen settled on an image that prompted the next item in the segment.

A frequent subject chosen by the God Machine is Islam. Whenever this occurred, the host would make a side comment about the religion in an attempt to placate any angry Muslims. These statements include, "Islam! About which there is nothing funny", or "Islam! Which I respect completely."

Colbert made the "God Machine" famous as an icon for irreverent and sometimes provocative examination of religious issues. When Rob Corddry first took over God Machine duties, he indicated that he is an Episcopalian.

On the April 19, 2007 episode of The Colbert Report, during Sean Penn's and Stephen Colbert's Meta-Free-Phor-All, a modified version of the "God Machine" sound was used to generate subjects. The "God Machine" made an additional appearance during the June 5, 2007 episode of The Colbert Report.

=== Trendspotting ===
Trendspotting was a segment hosted by comedian and "Youth Correspondent" Demetri Martin. In this segment, Martin provides viewers with a comedic look at new, youth-targeted trends. Topics included wine, Xbox 360, Myspace.com, life coaching, hookahs, and credit card companies. On July 24, 2007, correspondent John Oliver filled in for a slightly altered "Political Trendspotting" segment on the YouTube Debates, wearing a Demetri Martin wig and attempting to adopt his hip vernacular. (Ironically, Oliver is 5 years younger than Martin).

=== We Love Showbiz ===
We Love Showbiz was a segment hosted by Steve Carell and Nancy Walls (who are now married). It was a parody of Access Hollywood, Entertainment Tonight and similar shows; poking fun at their sycophantic attitude towards celebrities. After Walls' departure in 2002, other female correspondents (Lauren Weedman and Rachael Harris) hosted opposite Carell. When Carell was not available, Ed Helms would host. Rob Corddry also hosted twice during the summer of 2003, once with Steve Carell and once with Samantha Bee. The segment was discontinued in 2003.

=== Wilmore-Oliver Investigates ===
Wilmore-Oliver Investigates was a segment in which correspondents Larry Wilmore and John Oliver parody investigative journalism. The segment has been featured three times. The first installment explored the use of the n word, and the second segment explored celebrities who utter offensive statements. The third looked into a Republican debate at a primarily African-American college which none of the major candidates showed up to; this segment was repeated on January 24, 2008. Most of the humor in the segment is drawn from the differences between British correspondent Oliver and African-American correspondent Wilmore. The segment debuted on March 28, 2007.

This first segment was a focus of conversation when Wilmore appeared on NPR's Fresh Air with Terry Gross in June 2007.

=== Whaaa? ===
Whaaa? was a segment that was sometimes introduced during coverage of news stories that Stewart claimed to find particularly bewildering, such as the revelation that the Army was firing Arabic-speaking linguists for being gay, or that AOL Time Warner had managed to lose $99 billion in a single year. The device was used during 2002 and 2003 and was identified by Stewart's turning to camera three and the appearance of a large blue logo reading, "Whaaa?"

=== Worst Responders ===
Worst Responders (a reference to first responders) was a segment that castigated politicians' responses to disasters. Its most famous airing occurred in 2010, when Stewart brought in first responders Kenny Specht, John Devlin, Ken George and Chris Bowman in an attempt to urge passage of the Zadroga Act. Stewart revived the bit in 2015 on Noah's show to urge reauthorization of the Act.

=== You're Welcome with John Hodgman ===
On February 12, 2009, "Resident Expert" John Hodgman began a new segment called You're Welcome, in which he uses his "expertise" to permanently solve the country's most pressing problems. For instance, in the first segment, he proposed to save the struggling economy in part by making Criss Angel the treasury secretary (promising that he would "levitate the economy, make it disappear, then pull it out of the belly button of a Hooters waitress"), and instituting an "emergency Christmas" to get people shopping.

=== The Toss ===
For a time, at the end of a show, just before the Moment of Zen, Jon Stewart "[checked] in with our good friend Stephen Colbert at The Colbert Report." Meant as a parody of major news shows bridging to one another on networks such as CNN, the sequence usually consisted of either a "sneak preview" of Colbert's show or a brief discussion about something that occurred on Stewart's. Ultimately, however, the sequence often ended with Colbert's egotistical character insulting Stewart. Usually, both Colbert and especially Stewart were prone to breaking character and laughing. Once a feature of virtually every episode, the frequency of The Toss was cut back to the point where the Toss happened only once every couple of weeks. The Toss did not appear from February 2011 to November 2014, due to scheduling conflicts between the two shows. The segment reappeared for the first time in nearly four years on November 4, 2014, when both shows aired live coverage of the 2014 midterm elections. It appeared again on Thursday, December 18, 2014, when Stephen Colbert had his final episode of his show, The Colbert Report.

From January 2015 until Stewart's departure in August 2015, the segment aired every Monday with Stewart and Larry Wilmore bantering as a bridge to The Nightly Show.

=== Other segment titles ===
As with "Indecision" and "Mess-O-Potamia," other humorous titles have been used to indicate the subject matter of various segments. Recently, these have included:

- Clusterf**k to the White House, a segment on the 2008 presidential election, the title referring to the large number of candidates (which at the time was 18) running for the position.
  - Clusterf**k to the Poorhouse, which features news about the worsening US and world economies.
    - Variations on the theme include Clustershag to 10 Downing on the 2010 British general election, and Clusterf**k to the Warhouse on the Israeli and Korean crises of late May and early June 2010.
- Gaywatch / We're Here, We're Queer, Get Newsed to It, a segment focusing on issues relating to the gay rights movement, such as same-sex marriage and Don't Ask, Don't Tell.
- Baracknophobia, referring to news outlets and other organization that have a seemingly irrational fear of President Barack Obama.
- A variant on Indecision 2008, The Long, Flat Seemingly Endless Bataan Death March to the White House, covering the drawn-out contest between Barack Obama and Hillary Clinton for the Democratic nomination.
- You Don't Know Dick (later, "Even Dick Don't Know Dick" and "You Don't Know Richard Cheney" when Lynne Cheney was the guest), which chronicles Vice President Dick Cheney's various levels of secrecy. On the February 5, 2009 episode, Stewart officially changed the name of the segment to "Why Are You Such A Dick?"
- ¿Ay, Mami, Por Qué es El Mentiroso Todavía a Cargo de la Ley? (Mommy, Why is the Lying Man Still in Charge of the Law?), which features highlights from Attorney General Alberto Gonzales's testimonies before Congress relating to the U.S. attorney firings scandal.
- America to the Rescue, which highlights arms deals between the United States Government and the governments of Middle Eastern countries. The segment is introduced by a melange of powerful music, a brief segment of George W. Bush speaking, and computer-generated fighter jets. A self-compounding instance that compounded U.S. weapons deals linked to Saddam Hussein and Osama bin Laden, "flashback" segment introductions from the Persian Gulf War (featuring George H. W. Bush) and the early 1980s Soviet invasion of Afghanistan (featuring Ronald Reagan).
- Maritime Salvage Update, which has appeared twice and chronicles current underwater archaeological news
- I Give Up, when Stewart highlights a story which makes him upset and hopeless.

== Past recurring Kilborn-era segments ==
Here is a list of past recurring segments from mostly the era in which Craig Kilborn hosted the show (1996–1998), in alphabetical order:

=== A Moment for Us ===
A Moment for Us was a segment in which host Craig Kilborn paused the show for a personal monologue with the audience. Kilborn carried the segment over when he left The Daily Show to become the host of The Late Late Show. The segment was featured during Kilborn's stint as host, from 1996 to 1998.

=== Backfire ===
Backfire was a segment that was an in-studio debate between correspondents A. Whitney Brown and Brian Unger. It is very similar to the later segment, "Even Stevphen", which were also in-studio debates between two correspondents. The segment's title is a parody of the political debate show, Crossfire. The segment began in or around 1996 and was discontinued when A. Whitney Brown and Brian Unger left the show in 1998.

=== Five Questions ===
Five Questions was a segment that was conducted during each show, when Craig Kilborn was the show's host. The segment would always come at the very end of Kilborn's informal celebrity interviews. In the segment, Kilborn would ask a sequence of five absurd questions that often had even more irrelevant answers. Actor Bill Murray gained notoriety for being the first and one of the few to answer all "correctly". Kathy Ireland had the dubious honor of only getting one, and that was with Kilborn's help.

A book released in 1998 by Comedy Central titled The Daily Show: Five Questions (ISBN 0-8362-5325-6), highlights many of the best interview moments from Craig Kilborn's stint as host.

When Kilborn left the show in 1998 in order to replace Tom Snyder on CBS's The Late Late Show, he was able to take the segment Five Questions with him to the new show, disallowing any future TDS host from using it in their interviews. However, in Jon Stewart's first week as host, he slowly phased out the "Five Questions", doing "Four Questions" on Monday, "Three Questions" on Tuesday, "Two Questions" on Wednesday, ending with "The One Question" on Thursday.

=== God Stuff ===
God Stuff was a segment in which the segment's host, John Bloom, presented an assortment of actual clips from various televangelists. It is very similar to the later segment, "This Week in God". The segment began around 1996.

=== Public Excess ===
Public Excess was a segment hosted by correspondent Rich Brown. The segment began in 1996 and was discontinued when he left the show in 1998. Public Excess segments from the past were still being shown in The Daily Show episodes up to mid 2000.

=== Trivial Compromise ===
Trivial Compromise was a Jeopardy!-like segment shown during the last commercial break during Craig Kilborn's tenure as host. It was hosted by Creator/Producer Lizz Winstead's mother and father Ginny and Wilbur Winstead via telephone.

== Recurring jokes ==
There are several comedic themes and gags which have recurred through the series. This is an incomplete list.

=== Current running gags ===
==== "Senior ______ Correspondent" ====
When a correspondent does a purported live shot, the caption of his or her title will say "Senior ______ Correspondent," with an absurd subject in which he or she is supposedly expert and therefore qualified to cover the story at hand. Some of the more ridiculous examples have included "Senior Child Molestation Correspondent," "Senior Conceptual Art Correspondent" and Larry Wilmore's long-standing title, "Senior Black Correspondent." (When Wilmore first appeared on the show, his title appeared in the caption as simply "Black Correspondent," but he refused to begin his report until it was changed to "Senior Black Correspondent.")

==== Pun Captions ====
Most news stories covered on The Daily Show are accompanied by an image in the top left-hand corner of the screen and a caption that is a pun connecting the story's subject with a familiar saying or pop-culture item. Examples include "Ebony and Irony," which was used when it was revealed that Strom Thurmond's family once owned Al Sharpton's; "Syria's Unfortunate Events" for the end of Syria's occupation of Lebanon; and "Scum-dog Million-hairs" in reference to corrupt Illinois governor Rod Blagojevich and his oft-ridiculed haircut. If the audience laughs particularly long at a joke, Stewart will often mock them with a comment to the effect of, "Really? We kinda thought we phoned that one in;" if they groan or snicker at it, he will say something defensive like, "You think it's easy coming up with these?" or "You should've seen the ones we didn't go with." One recurring joke, often used to make fun of the audience and the viewers, is to make a pun at World of Warcraft, using its text or making the segment's name World of ___craft.

==== Green Screens ====
Stewart and the correspondents sometimes make ad-libbed references to the fact that their "live reports" are nearly always filmed from inside the studio in front of a green-screen only a short distance from Stewart's desk. This is sometimes brought up if the picture on the screen contradicts reality–for example, if it shows a nighttime view of the city where the correspondent claims to be. Other references are scripted, such as when Samantha Bee, Jason Jones and Dan Bakkedahl all claimed to be reporting from three different Middle Eastern cities; appearing on a split screen, they tossed the many-pocketed khaki vest typically worn by correspondents during Middle East segments from frame to frame (each of them being unwilling to deliver a report about the Middle East without wearing khaki). Another time, Jason Jones, having actually gone to Denmark to report a story, shoved a passerby in order to "prove" he was really there.

==== "Meet Me at Camera Three" ====
Meet Me At Camera Three is a common phrase coined by Stewart, which began in 2006, to initiate what is intended to be a direct address to the person or group with which the current topic is concerned. Typically after expressing his distaste for the subject's actions, Stewart will then request that (for example) "Walt Disney Company, meet me at camera three", at which point the shot switches to a camera situated at the right of the regular camera. Stewart turns on spot to face the camera, and sends his message to the subject, possibly beginning his speech with a relevant greeting, and then the shot is switched back to its regular camera. Trevor Noah has continued this tradition.

==== Africa Jokes ====
Trevor Noah, being from South Africa, started this running gag on the show in late 2016. Noah looks straight at Camera Three after making a joke pertaining to Africa and says things such as "Africa Jokes; where you thought I was joking but aren't so sure anymore".

==== Spirit Airlines ====
In lieu of the Arby's jokes Stewart did on the show, Noah has since made a punching bag out of Spirit Airlines. After making a joke about them, similar to Stewart, Noah would turn to either Camera 1 or Camera 3 and make up a slogan about the poor quality of Spirit.

==== Look at all those faces! ====
As a comment on the crowded 2020 Democratic nominees, Noah would show a group shot of all the nominees, plus a joke nominee, such as the original design of the movie Sonic the Hedgehog, and the title character from The Mandalorian, and say, "Look at all those faces! Look! At all! Those faces!"

=== Running gags under Stewart ===
==== "Arby's" ====
Jon Stewart would pull a fun yet insulting joke at the expense of fast food chain Arby's, usually claiming the food is inedible or unhealthy. After the joke, Stewart would sometimes claim they are a fine restaurant and has no reason to make fun of them.

Arby's CEO Paul Brown made an appearance on Jon Stewart's final episode on August 6, 2015. Arby's also made a 'Goodbye Jon Stewart' video for Stewart's last show, which was a small compilation of all the jokes that Stewart's made about them.

==== Mitch McConnell tortoise impersonation ====
A recurring joke involving Stewart imitating Senator Mitch McConnell in the voice of Cecil the Turtle, implying McConnell's tortoise-like appearance and mannerisms.

==== NAMBLA ====
A running gag is the insertion of the phrase "...or NAMBLA" (an acronym for the North American Man/Boy Love Association) instead of stating a proper abbreviation or acronym after mentioning a long or convoluted name, such as American Federation of State, County and Municipal Employees, Republican National Convention or Academy of Motion Picture Arts and Sciences. Similarly, the Organization of Petroleum Exporting Countries was dubbed "NAMBL-OPEC" and the National Rifle Association was dubbed "BLAMBLA." The International Atomic Energy Agency was termed "IAEA-BLA". An advocacy group concerned about alleged sexual abuse by Catholic priests was termed "Anti-NAMBLA". In August 2005, Stewart renamed NARAL Pro-Choice America "NAR-AMBLA". In the October 2005 debut of a segment called "Man vs. Nature: The War on Terra", which detailed the devastating effects of global warming, Stewart shivered as he said "NAMBLA" in reference to the National Snow and Ice Data Center. Stewart will even refer to organizations that are already acronyms as NAMBLA ("...the AARP, or NAMBLA").

While covering the 2004 Republican National Convention, Stephen Colbert was asked who he was representing and quickly answered, "Oh, I'm with NAMBLA." Unaware of the context, she replied, "Well, have fun tonight." (Incidentally, the woman he said this to turned out to be a friend of his sister.)

On July 27, 2006, a segment of the show titled "10 F#@king Years" featured many clips referring to the NAMBLA jokes. Jon Stewart ended the recap with yet another NAMBLA joke:

"You know, it's ironic. Now that we're 10-years-old, we're exactly the right age to draw the attention of NAMBLA. However, for the record, The Daily Show has absolutely no affiliation with the North American Man Boy Love Association, or, as it's called, UNICEF."

The joke was used once again in reference to the Mark Foley scandal, with Stewart speaking of the "North American Man Boy Love Association, or Congress."

On October 30, 2006, Jon Stewart played a clip from the Ohio gubernatorial race in which Ken Blackwell accused his opponent of getting support from NAMBLA. Jon Stewart stated "I knew I'd be right at some point with that acronym."

On November 30, 2006, Jon Stewart played a clip from the joint news conference of President Bush and Iraqi Prime Minister Nouri al-Maliki in Amman, Jordan. Jon Stewart made a joke about George W. Bush's announcement regarding the Joint Committee on Accelerating the Transferring of Security Responsibility, dubbing it SCRAMBLA.

Stephen Colbert carried the joke over to his program, The Colbert Report; in November 2007 when he was told by the South Carolina Democratic Council that he wasn't going to be on the primary ballot, he responded by saying "I assume you'll be donating my application fee to NAMBLA?"

A reference to NAMBLA also appears in America (The Book): A Citizen's Guide to Democracy Inaction. A spread providing information about different lobbies includes a "stated agenda" and "hidden agenda" for each group; for example, the "hidden agenda" of Hollywood is, "A Baldwin in the White House by 2016." NAMBLA's entry reads, "Stated agenda: The legalization of sexual relations between men and young boys. Hidden agenda: Dude, did you read the stated agenda?"

==== Vilsack Duck ====
During 2006 the show developed a running joke based on the name and relative obscurity of Democratic Governor Tom Vilsack. In a joint parody of the Aflac Duck, mentions of the governor on the show are proceeded with a duck quacking his name as "Vil-sack!". When Vilsack appeared as a guest on the show in December 2006, the joke was again used with the duck initially respectfully stating Vilsack's full name and title before being urged by Stewart to return to the standard joke. Vilsack himself later in the same show made light of the joke by presenting Stewart with a talking plush toy of the Aflac Duck with a badge reading "#1 Vilsack Fan", and saying "I'm not going to duck the issue". On occasion, the duck has also blurted out similar words such as "Brown-back!" (for Sam Brownback) and "Mor-mon!". As a result of Tom Vilsack's withdrawal from the presidential race, the joke was retired during the February 27, 2007 episode, including a CGI render of the duck wailing "Villlllllllsaaaack!!" in anguish.

A similar joke was used to describe then-Presidential-candidate Barack Obama, where the duck said "half-black."

==== Time Magazine Person of the Year 2006 ====
A recurring joke has involved Time Magazine's much criticised/mocked choice for Person of the Year 2006; 'You', signified with a mirror surface on the cover. When clips are played showing an individual highlighting the behaviour of 'you' (the common people/American voter), Stewart has begun dropping quips about the Time Magazine choice. If the comment made was positive, the joke involves the notion that this is the next big thing for 'you' after Time Magazine. If the comment was negative, the joke is based on the idea things have gone downhill for 'you' after the Time Magazine highlight.

==== Jimmy Dean Pancakes & Sausage On A Stick ====
First referenced on October 19, 2006, this food item has become a recurring joke with much humor derived from its strange mix of ingredients. Baconnaise, another unusual food item, was first mentioned on February 25, 2009 and has likewise been brought out as a recurring joke. Jon Stewart combined the two foods, dipping a blueberry-pancake-and-sausage stick into a jar of Baconnaise Lite.

==== Giant Heads ====
When the set was changed for the second time on April 9, 2007, the stagehands, according to Jon Stewart, made "one glitch ... a classic mistake that people make when they first break in a new set" and "installed the giant head of Brian Williams". Williams appears in the giant projection screen behind Jon Stewart and occasionally insults and demeans Stewart in regards to his journalistic skills on the show, including pointing out that Stewart "needs a teleprompter to read the fake news". Also, when Stewart mocked Brian Williams' service as a moderator in a Democratic Presidential Debate, Williams appeared behind him, intimidating and correcting Jon, before threatening that he found a way to appear at Stewart's home. Jon typically responds that he's surprised that Brian Williams is such a dick to him. In later shows, the giant heads of Robert Loggia, Ted Koppel, and Bruce Willis have also made an appearance.

==== Jon Stewart... ====
These segments start with Jon Stewart in the title and are often followed by something that, while related to the topic, can easily be misinterpreted as rude or unacceptable behavior. Such captions include Jon Stewart Looks at Kids junk, a look at recent technology advances, or Jon Stewart's Big Gay Problem, which was an intended name change for the Gaywatch segment, now known as We're here, We're Queer, Get Newsed to it. When the name of the segment is introduced, it is followed by Jon turning towards back stage and telling off the crew.
