= Fag hag =

Gay slang for a woman who associates mainly with gay men

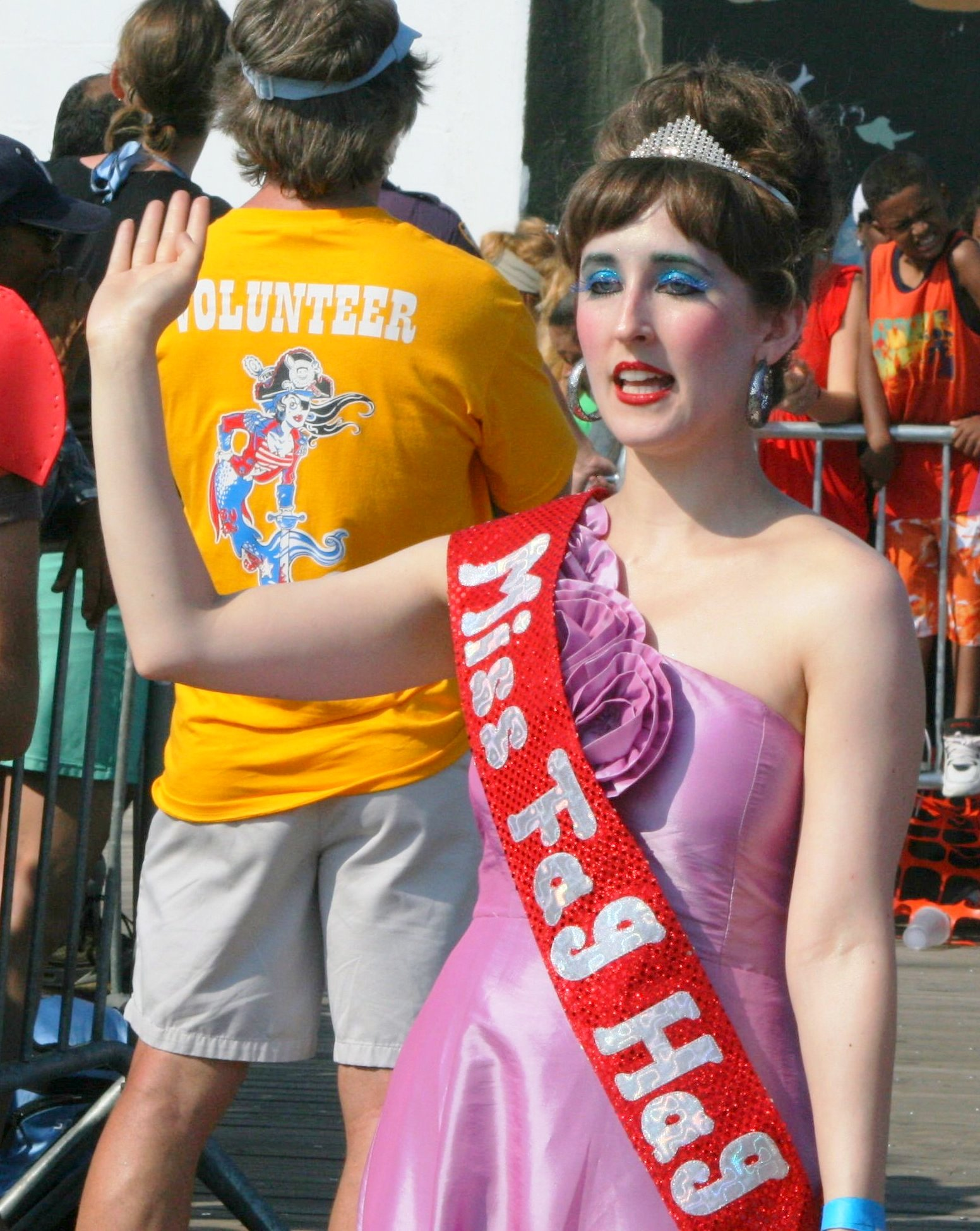
"Miss Fag Hag" at the 2010 Mermaid Parade in Coney Island

A fag hag is, in gay slang, a heterosexual woman who associates either mostly or exclusively with gay and bisexual men. The phrase originated in gay male culture in the United States and United Kingdom and was historically not an insult. Some women who associate with gay men object to being called fag hags while others embrace the term. The male counterpart, for heterosexual men who have similar interpersonal relationships with gay and bisexual men, is fag stag.

== Usage ==
Fag hags are frequently stereotyped as outgoing women who are seeking a substitute for heterosexual relationships, or who are secretly (or openly) sexually attracted to gay men. In fact, many women who identify as fag hags are already in romantic relationships, either with straight men or with women, but seek out the alternative experience of socializing with gay men.

== Related terms ==
American fag hag synonyms include fruit fly, queen bee, homo honey, fruit loop, Goldilocks, flame dame, fairy princess, gabe (a portmanteau of "gay" and "babe") and fairy godmother.

In the case of friendships between lesbians and gay men, the term dyke diva describes the gay man in the relationship. A straight man of platonic affinity with gay men is a fag stag; again, the usage is rare in mainstream sexual culture.

For men who have many lesbian friends the slang terms dutch boy, lesbro or dyke tyke apply.

Heterosexuals who associate with lesbian, gay, and bisexual people may be called fruit flies regardless of their sex.

Fag hags, fag stags, etc. are regarded as belonging to the phenomenon of "hagism", the attachment of a person to a group defined by sexuality, even though they do not personally share that identity.

In the Philippines, heterosexual women who develop deep friendships or almost exclusively associate with the native bakla LGBT subculture are known as babaeng bakla (literally "a woman who is a bakla [gay man]"). They stereotypically acquire the mannerisms, campy sense of humor, lingo (swardspeak), and fashion sense of the bakla. They are also usually more extroverted and socially dominant. It is commonly perceived as a positive self-identification, and various prominent local celebrities (like Maricel Soriano and Rufa Mae Quinto) openly identify as babaeng bakla.

Girlfag is a term similar to fag hag, but designate specifically attraction, either sexually or romantically, to gay men, sometimes to the point of identifying as queer or genderqueer. Men who are attracted to lesbians/sapphics also have their slangs, such as lesboy, guydyke, and boydyke.

== In popular culture ==
The term has often been used in entertainment. It was used in the lyrics of hip hop group Grandmaster Flash and the Furious Five's 1982 hit "The Message". Comedian Margaret Cho has written and regularly talks in her stand-up routines about being a fag hag. In an episode of the British TV sitcom Gimme Gimme Gimme, Tom refers to Linda as a fag hag. The term was used in multiple episodes of the sitcom Will and Grace when referring to characters Grace Adler and Karen Walker as their best friends are both gay men. The term was also used in one of the episodes of Sex and the City, in which Samantha overheard two women discussing her relationship with the actor Smith Jerrod, calling her a fag hag. English singer Lily Allen released a song called "Fag Hag" in 2008 as the B-side to "The Fear".

The first annual Miss Fag Hag Pageant took place in New York City on May 17, 2009 at Comix with judges Caroline Rhea, Michael Musto, Hedda Lettuce and Katina Corrao. Heather Shields took the first prize.

== See also ==
- Beard (companion)
- Non-LGBTQ patronage of LGBTQ venues
- Fujoshi, a woman who prefers manga about men who have sex with men
- Straight ally
