= Non-LGBTQ patronage of LGBTQ venues =

Non-LGBTQ patronage of LGBTQ venues and events is the presence of cisgender, heterosexual people at LGBTQ spaces such as gay bars, lesbian bars, pride parades, and LGBTQ community centres. LGBTQ opinions on the presence of non-LGBTQ people in LGBTQ spaces vary widely. Some LGBTQ spaces may be regarded by LGBTQ people as safe spaces and the presence of non-LGBTQ people may be debated. Some LGBTQ people only object to the presence of non-LGBTQ people who engage in behavior that is homophobic, transphobic, or fetishizing. Some people view gay men's attempts to exclude straight women from gay bars as misogynistic or exclusionary. Some people who are LGBTQ, such as bisexual or transgender people, may be incorrectly perceived as non-LGBTQ by other LGBTQ people when they attend LGBTQ venues. The presence of straight allies at LGBTQ pride parades and marches is common.

== About ==
=== Straight people in gay bars ===
Some gay men object to the practice of straight women holding bachelorette parties at gay male bars. Some gay men have reported that straight women in gay male bars have engaged in homophobic behavior, sexually objectified gay men, taken intrusive photographs, or groped gay male patrons. Some gay men believe that there has been a "hetrification" of gay male spaces, comparing it to gentrification.

=== Impact on bisexuals ===
Some bisexual people are sometimes incorrectly perceived as heterosexual in LGBTQ venues and may not always be welcomed. The cisgender, heterosexual partners of bisexual people may not be welcome in all LGBTQ spaces.

=== Men in lesbian bars ===
Straight men may not be welcome in lesbian bars. Some lesbians complain of straight men engaging in sexually inappropriate or unsafe behaviors towards women in lesbian bars. There is debate among lesbians over whether trans men belong in lesbian bars.

== See also ==
- Fag hag
- Fag stag
- Fetishization of LGBTQ people
- Safe space
- Straight ally
