= The Decision =

The Decision may refer to:

- The Decision (TV program), TV show that featured basketball player LeBron James' decision to switch teams
- The Decision (play), by the twentieth-century German dramatist Bertolt Brecht
- "The Decision" (Australian Playhouse), an Australian television play
- The Decision (Animorphs), a book in the series
- "The Decision" (Doctors), a 2003 television episode
- "The Decision", a song by English indie rock band Young Knives from their album Voices of Animals and Men
- "The Decision", a song by American comedy rock band Ninja Sex Party from the album NSFW (album)

== See also ==
- Decision (disambiguation)
