= Undecidable =

Undecidable may refer to:

- Undecidable problem in computer science and mathematical logic, a decision problem that no algorithm can decide, formalized as an undecidable language or undecidable set
- "Undecidable", sometimes also used as a synonym of independent, something that can neither be proved nor disproved within a mathematical theory
- Undecidable figure, a two-dimensional drawing of something that cannot exist in 3d, such as appeared in some of the works of M. C. Escher

== See also ==
- Decidable (disambiguation)
