= List of The Daily Show correspondents =

This article is a list of the correspondents and on-screen contributors who have appeared on the satirical television program The Daily Show. Correspondents, collectively known as "The Best F#@king News Team Ever", normally have two roles: "experts" with satirical "senior" titles whom the host interviews about certain issues, or hosts of original reporting segments, which often showcase interviews of serious political figures. During Jon Stewart's tenure, the show's contributors often had their own unique recurring segment on the show and tended to appear less frequently; former host Trevor Noah is a former correspondent and contributor who was featured during the Stewart era.

== Current cast ==
=== Hosts ===
Name	Debut	Notes
Jon Stewart	January 11, 1999 February 12, 2024	Succeeded Kilborn as the new host of The Daily Show and is the most prolific host of the show. Stewart's final show was an hour long special on August 6, 2015. He returned to the show on December 7, 2015, to urge Congress to permanently extend a health care law for 9/11 first responders. Returned to host on a weekly basis on February 12, 2024.

=== Senior correspondents (rotating hosts) ===
Name	Debut	Notes
Desi Lydic	September 29, 2015	New Senior Geopolitical Correspondent, Senior Antiquities Correspondent, Senior Campaign Correspondent, Segment Host: "What The Actual Fact?", Weatherperson (Noah era).
Ronny Chieng	October 7, 2015	Senior Technology Correspondent, Senior Climatology Correspondent, Senior Basketball Correspondent, Segment Host: "Everything is Stupid", "What's Trending".
Michael Kosta	July 11, 2017	Senior Constitutional Correspondent, Senior American Correspondent, Segment Co-Host: "I Apologize for Talking While You Were Talking", Stock reporter (Noah era).
Jordan Klepper	March 3, 2014 December 16, 2019	New Senior Caucasian Correspondent, Senior Congressional Correspondent, Senior Campaign Correspondent, Senior Technology Correspondent, Senior Fantasy Culture Correspondent, Senior Fantasy Sports Correspondent, Senior Iowan Correspondent, Senior U.K. Correspondent, Segment Host: "Jordan Fingers the Pulse". Filled in for a sick Trevor Noah on October 20, 2016. Left the show so he can begin hosting his own spin-off The Opposition with Jordan Klepper on September 25, 2017. After the show got cancelled in 2018, he hosted a docuseries titled Klepper in 2019. He returned to The Daily Show on December 16, 2019 as a contributor, but was migrated to rotating host in the second Stewart era, making him the last remaining correspondent from the Jon Stewart era.
Josh Johnson	February 20, 2024	Also on writing staff (2017–present)

=== Correspondents ===
Name	Debut	Notes
Troy Iwata	October 19, 2023	
Grace Kuhlenschmidt	October 25, 2023	

=== Contributors ===
Name	Debut	Notes
Lewis Black	July 31, 1996	"Back in Black", he is the longest-running contributor to work on The Daily Show, having served on the show since the first month it was on the air.
Leslie Jones	March 25, 2024	Guest host turned contributor, former SNL cast member.

== Former cast ==
=== Hosts ===
Name	Year joined	Year left	Notes
Craig Kilborn	July 22, 1996	December 17, 1998	The original host left the show because he was chosen to host The Late Late Show with Tom Snyder's departure. Kilborn appeared on the show 16 years later on Jon Stewart's final episode on August 6, 2015. Returned to narrate a "Daily Show-ography" of Stephen A. Smith on June 12, 2025.
Trevor Noah	September 28, 2015	December 8, 2022	Originally debuted as the Senior International Correspondent and as a contributor on December 4, 2014. In March 2015, Comedy Central revealed that he would be hosting the show. Noah’s final show was an hour long special on December 8, 2022.

=== Correspondents ===
Name	Year joined	Year left	Notes
Dan Bakkedahl	September 20, 2005	September 25, 2007	Hired to replace departing correspondent Stephen Colbert on September 25, 2005. Filed his final report on September 25, 2007.
Samantha Bee	July 10, 2003	April 30, 2015	"This Week in God", "Are You Prepared?!?"; The Daily Show's first non-US citizen correspondent; all-time longest-serving regular correspondent after passing Stephen Colbert in 2011; filled in for a sick Jon Stewart on October 7, 2014. Bee departed the show on April 30, 2015, to host Full Frontal with Samantha Bee on TBS. She is married to fellow former correspondent Jason Jones.
Mary Birdsong	January 31, 2002	March 14, 2002	Contributing correspondent.
A. Whitney Brown	July 23, 1996	December 15, 1998	"Backfire"; was one of The Daily Show's original correspondents. Had his own The Daily Show special in 1998 called "Weirder Than Whitney".
Nancy Walls	December 7, 1999	August 8, 2002	"We Love Showbiz", "Popular Music Omnibus", "Dollars and "Cents"". Was credited under maiden name, Nancy Walls, and has been married to fellow former correspondent Steve Carell since 1995.
Steve Carell	February 11, 1999	April 4, 2005	"Even Stevphen", "Produce Pete", "Dollars and "Cents"", "We Love Showbiz", "Slimmin' Down With Steve", "Ad Nauseam". Carell had his own The Daily Show special in May 2001 called "Steve Carell Salutes Steve Carell" highlighting his most popular field assignments on the show. Carell is the first correspondent to become a major movie and television star, and the only correspondent to receive an Academy Award nomination since leaving The Daily Show in early 2005. Carell has since returned numerous times as a featured guest. He is married to fellow former correspondent Nancy (Walls) Carell.
Wyatt Cenac	June 3, 2008	December 13, 2012	Senior Correspondent; also provides voice for Michael Steele puppet. Filed his final report on December 13, 2012, but also made cameo guest appearances on August 15, 2013, for the last show of guest host John Oliver.
Michael Che	June 4, 2014	September 18, 2014	Left to co-anchor "Weekend Update" on Saturday Night Live. Shortest correspondent tenure as of 2015. Was among the former correspondents who made an appearance on Jon Stewart's final episode on August 6, 2015.
Stephen Colbert	June 26, 1997	September 26, 2005	"Even Stevphen", "This Week in God", "The Jobbing of America". Stephen Colbert hosted The Daily Show six times (January 24, 2001; February 20 and 22, 2001; March 26–27, 2001; April 3 and 5, 2001; May 2–3, 2001; March 6, 2003; July 6, 2004). Although Colbert left The Daily Show team in mid-2005, through 2010 Stewart frequently "tossed" to him at The Colbert Report at the end of a show. Colbert has also made a number of Daily Show cameos since 2005, particularly in reference to his mock "presidential campaigns" in 2007–08 and 2011–12, and Stewart's stewardship of Colbert SuperPAC in 2011. With a nearly nine-year tenure, Colbert was the longest serving correspondent on The Daily Show until his record was broken by Samantha Bee in 2011. While Colbert’s official tenure at the Daily Show lasted for 8 years and three months (26 June 1997–26 Sept 2005), in the closing seconds of the final Colbert Report (18 Dec 2014), Colbert ‘tossed’ back to Jon Stewart at the Daily Show desk, who thanked him for his report and announced the Daily Show’s usual moment of Zen, unofficially making the entire run of the Colbert Report a long-form field piece of the Daily Show, and making Colbert’s unofficial tenure just short of 17 and a half years. Went on to become the new host of The Late Show on CBS.
Nate Corddry	October 4, 2005	May 2, 2006	The younger brother of correspondent Rob Corddry. As a running joke on the show, older brother Rob would often appear in Nate's segments usually picking on him. This eventually led to the two brothers having their own "Even Stevphen"-style debate segment called "Brother vs. Brother".
Rob Corddry	April 17, 2002	August 24, 2006	"This Week in God", "Come On!", "Popular Music Omnibus", and as he liked to call them, "Poop jokes". Corddry filled in for Stewart (on paternity leave) on February 9, 2006. He left the show in August 2006 to start a film career and to star in The Winner, a Fox comedy that ran from March 4 to March 18, 2007. He has also returned as a special guest correspondent several times since.
Josh Gad	May 5, 2009	June 27, 2011	Contributing Correspondent. Made his last appearance on June 27, 2011.
Vance DeGeneres	January 14, 1999	May 17, 2001	"Dollars and "Cents"", "A Tale of Survival", had his own The Daily Show special in 2000 highlighting his popular "Tales of Survival" segments.
Rachael Harris	October 28, 2002	March 20, 2003	"Mark Your Calendar", "We Love Showbiz".
Ed Helms	April 29, 2002	December 5, 2006	"Digital Watch", "Ad Nauseam", "Mark Your Calendar", "We Love Showbiz", "This Week in God". Helms and fellow correspondent Rob Corddry had their own The Daily Show special in 2003 called "I'm a Correspondent: Please Don't Fire Me". Helms made an appearance on July 21, 2008, as a special guest correspondent. Helms was one of the stars of the 2009 comedy The Hangover and was a regular cast member on NBC's The Office, beginning with its third season.
Jason Jones	September 29, 2005	March 26, 2015	"Are You Prepared?!?", "Jason Jones 180"; Filled in for a sick Jon Stewart on October 7, 2014. Departed the show on March 26, 2015. He is married to fellow former correspondent Samantha Bee.
Beth Littleford	July 24, 1996	May 18, 2000	"The Beth Littleford Interview", "bETh". In 1999, she had her own The Daily Show special called "The Beth Littleford Interview Special", highlighting her popular celebrity interviews. She was the only original correspondent to stay with the show after Jon Stewart took over as host, leaving the show in 2000.
Al Madrigal	May 17, 2011	January 12, 2016	Senior Latino Correspondent. California correspondent. Made guest appearances on January 23, 2025 and May 22, 2025.
Aasif Mandvi	August 9, 2006	October 14, 2015	Senior Middle East Correspondent; started as a contributor; but made correspondent in March 2007. Senior Campaign Correspondent.
Hasan Minhaj	November 19, 2014	August 16, 2018	Senior Indian Correspondent. Senior Political Correspondent. Senior Congressional Correspondent. Departed to host his own show Patriot Act with Hasan Minhaj on Netflix.
Olivia Munn	June 3, 2010	September 12, 2011	Senior Asian Correspondent. Made a guest return on April 9, 2025 and June 1, 2026.
John Oliver	July 31, 2006	December 19, 2013	Senior British Person; "Wilmore-Oliver Investigates"; on writing staff from 2007 to 2013. Interim host during the summer of 2013. He departed the show on December 19, 2013, to prepare hosting his own late night show Last Week Tonight with John Oliver on HBO which premiered on April 27, 2014. Returned to host the show on November 13, 2014, to promote Jon Stewart's film, Rosewater.
Rob Riggle	September 20, 2006	December 10, 2008	Senior Military Affairs Correspondent; Some of his most memorable work on the show included his overseas special assignments. His week-long reports from Iraq in 2007 titled "Operation: Silent Thunder" brought much attention to the show. After the success of "Silent Thunder", he traveled to China for his second overseas four-part series during the 2008 Olympics, titled "Rob Riggle: Chasing the Dragon". Shortly after announcing he would be leaving the show, he made his farewell appearance on December 10, 2008. Riggle made a surprise appearance on the August 3, 2010, show, during an interview with Will Ferrell and again on August 15, 2013, for the last show of guest host John Oliver. Made a cameo the week of Nov 17th in a correspondent report.
Mo Rocca	November 16, 1998	August 20, 2003	"Dollars and "Cents"", "Mark Your Calendar", "Mopinion". Rocca went on to parlay his Daily Show correspondent persona in numerous other cable appearances, such as several VH1 "talking head" shows and at the 2004 political conventions for Larry King Live. He is currently a correspondent for CBS News Sunday Morning.
Jeff Ross	July 22, 1996	June 18, 1997	Contributing correspondent.
Denny Siegel	February 2, 1999	April 15, 1999	Contributing correspondent.
Dulcé Sloan	September 9, 2017	January 17, 2025	Senior Fashion Correspondent, Lottery announcer (Noah era). 2024 rotating host during Stewart second era for a scheduled week only in her senior correspondent duties but reduced to one day due to the 2023 WGA strike.
Jeff Stilson	October 9, 1998	January 18, 1999	Contributing correspondent.
Miriam Tolan	June 15, 2000	July 25, 2001	Contributing correspondent. Also occasionally filled in for Nancy Walls on "Dollars and "Cents""
Brian Unger	July 22, 1996	December 16, 1998	"Backfire", was one of The Daily Show's original correspondents.
David Wain	July 23, 1996	August 6, 1996	Contributing correspondent.
Matt Walsh	May 2, 2001	June 25, 2002	News You Can Utilize, "Dollars and "Cents"", had his own The Daily Show special in May 2002 called "Matt Walsh Goes to Hawaii".
Lauren Weedman	July 16, 2001	October 7, 2002	"Dollars and "Cents"", "We Love Showbiz".
Jaboukie Young-White	October 11, 2018	May 5, 2021	Senior Youth Correspondent.
Jessica Williams	January 11, 2012	June 30, 2016	Senior Youth Correspondent. Senior Beyoncé Correspondent. Senior Congressional Correspondent. Senior Campaign Correspondent. Senior Political Correspondent. Made surprise appearances on April 22, 2024 and October 28, 2024.
Bob Wiltfong	April 6, 2004	December 1, 2005	Contributing correspondent.
Lizz Winstead	July 22, 1996	December 18, 1997	Original correspondent and co-creator of The Daily Show.
Roy Wood Jr.	September 28, 2015	May 1, 2023	Senior Mars Correspondent, Senior Wall Street Correspondent, Senior Campaign Correspondent, Senior Immigration Correspondent, Senior Hollywood Correspondent, Steve Harvey impersonator, Segment Host: "CP Time", Segment Co-Host: "I Apologize for Talking While You Were Talking", Traffic reporter.
Stacey Grenrock-Woods	April 2, 1998	October 21, 2003	Contributing correspondent.

=== Contributors ===
Name	Year joined	Year left	Notes
Amy Atkins	March 10, 1998	March 23, 1998	Contributor.
Dave Attell	April 1, 1999	January 22, 2002	Contributor, "The Ugly American".
Michael Blieden	July 30, 1996	January 24, 2000	Contributor, original host of "Ad Nauseam".
John Bloom	July 25, 1996	June 20, 2000	Contributor, "God Stuff".
Neal Brennan	March 14, 2016	January 30, 2020	Contributor, Trevor's friend.
Rich Brown	October 20, 1998	May 9, 2000	Contributor, "Public Excess". Also a one-time correspondent.
Sameer Butt	December 4, 1997	April 16, 1998	Contributor.
Eliza Cossio	May 16, 2016	January 24, 2017	Newest Contributor; Senior Latina Contributor
Frank DeCaro	October 10, 1996	March 19, 2003	Contributor, "Out at the Movies"; he hosted his own program on Sirius Satellite Radio and was a celebrity panelist on GSN's revival of I've Got a Secret.
Mick Foley	November 19, 2009	June 18, 2013	Contributor, "Senior Ass Kicker".
Dave Gorman	April 24, 2006	October 5, 2006	Contributor, "Poll Smoking"; appeared on the show once as a guest in 2001 to promote Are You Dave Gorman?.
Al Greenwood	March 16, 1998	October 18, 2000	Contributor, "Al Up in That". Greenwood (known for his local "Bedspread King" commercials) appeared as the show's "elderly consumer advocate". In 2000, he hosted The Daily Show special "Al Greenwood's Wrinkled Nuts", a best-of collection of the correspondent's field interviews with elderly residents. Greenwood died on June 6, 2001, at age 93. An "in memoriam" clip for Greenwood was shown as the "Moment of Zen" on the show that week.
Buck Henry	January 31, 2007	September 24, 2007	Contributor, "The Henry Stops Here", Senior Historical Perspectivist. Henry died on January 8, 2020, at age 89.
John Hodgman	January 16, 2006	June 4, 2015	Resident Expert, Deranged Millionaire, "You're Welcome", "Exper-teasers"; "Money Talks"; appeared on the show once as a guest in November 2005 to promote The Areas of My Expertise. Returned as a "Resident Maine Expert" on October 27, 2026.
Tom Johnson	May 11, 2000	October 2, 2001	Contributor, "Lord Viper Scorpion".
Andy Kindler	October 19, 2000	March 21, 2001	Contributor, "TV Guy".
Robert Knight	February 4, 1997	April 23, 1997	Contributor.
Ed Lover	September 30, 1996	December 19, 1996	Contributor, "Ed Lover's America".
Adam Lowitt	December 9, 2015	March 2, 2017	Senior Jewish Correspondent
Demetri Martin	November 14, 2005	February 28, 2008	Contributor, "Trendspotting". Left to star in his own Comedy Central show, Important Things with Demetri Martin.
Molly Pesce	July 24, 1996	May 28, 1998	Originally co-hosted The Daily Show's movie review segments with Frank DeCaro. Eventually, DeCaro would go solo with his own segment "Out at the Movies" in 1997.
Kristen Schaal	March 13, 2008	March 1, 2016	Women's Issues Correspondent; married to long-time Daily Show writer Rich Blomquist.
Tom Shillue	September 29, 1998	July 20, 2000	Contributor, "This Week in Hate". Become a correspondent in 2000 before leaving.
Campbell Smith	May 8, 2001	January 14, 2002	Contributor, "Dollars and "Cents"".
William Stephenson	April 20, 1999	August 27, 1999	Contributor, "What I'm Sayin". Stephenson died on January 14, 2019, at age 61.
Paul F. Tompkins	August 6, 1998	December 3, 1998	Contributor, "Us People's Weekly Entertainment".
Larry Wilmore	August 22, 2006	December 2, 2014	Senior Black Correspondent, "Wilmore-Oliver Investigates". Left to host The Nightly Show with Larry Wilmore.
Michelle Wolf	April 7, 2016	November 15, 2017	Senior Women's Issues Correspondent. Previously a writer on Late Night with Seth Meyers, Wolf went on to host her own show, The Break with Michelle Wolf on Netflix, which ran for ten episodes. Returned on November 18, 2026 for I.M.O.
Gina Yashere	March 16, 2017	July 16, 2018	Senior British Correspondent.
Bassem Youssef	February 10, 2015	April 14, 2015	Senior Middle East Correspondent. The host of Al-Bernameg (The Program), a satirical news program broadcast in Egypt from 2011 to 2014. The press has compared Youssef with Stewart, who served as an inspiration for Youssef to begin his career.

== Timeline chart ==
List of The Daily Show correspondents (3 years or more)
1990s				2000s										2010s										2020s						
96	97	98	99	00	01	02	03	04	05	06	07	08	09	10	11	12	13	14	15	16	17	18	19	20	21	22	23	24	25	26
Host: Craig Kilborn			Host: Jon Stewart																	Host: Trevor Noah							Host: Various	Host: Jon Stewart & various		
																					Dulcé Sloan									
																					Michael Kosta									
																					Jaboukie Young-White									
																				Ronny Chieng										
																				Desi Lydic										
																				Roy Wood Jr.										
																		Hasan Minhaj												
																		Jordan Klepper					Jordan Klepper							
																Jessica Williams														
														Al Madrigal																
												Wyatt Cenac																		
											Aasif Mandvi																			
										John Oliver																				
										Rob Riggle																				
									Dan Bakkedahl																					
									Jason Jones																					
							Samantha Bee																							
						Rob Corddry																								
						Ed Helms																								
			Steve Carell																											
			Nancy Walls																											
			Vance DeGeneres																											
		Mo Rocca																												
		Stacey Grenrock-Woods																												
	Stephen Colbert																													
Beth Littleford																														
A. Whitney Brown																														
Brian Unger																														
