= Decidability =

The word decidable may refer to:

- Decidable language
- Decidability (logic) for the equivalent in mathematical logic
- Decidable problem and Undecidable problem
- Gödel's incompleteness theorem, a theorem on the undecidability of languages consisting of "true statements" in mathematical logic.
- Recursive set, a "decidable set" in recursion theory

== See also ==
- Decision problem
- List of undecidable problems
- Decision (disambiguation)
- Decide (disambiguation)
