= Deicide (disambiguation) =

Deicide is the killing of a god.

Deicide may also refer to:

- Deicide (band), an American death metal band
  - Deicide (album), their 1990 eponymous album
- Jewish deicide, the theological position and antisemitic trope that Jews as a people are collectively responsible for the killing of Jesus

== See also ==
- Decide (disambiguation)
