= Leslie Dunkling =

British writer of books about proper names

Leslie Alan Dunkling
- Born: 1935 (age 90–91); Willesden, London, England
- Education: University College London
- Spouse: Nicole
- Children: 3

Leslie Alan Dunkling (born 1935) is an author known for his authoritative work on books about names, ranging from names people choose for their children to names of pubs.

== Biography ==
Dunkling was born at Willesden in north-east London, and grew up in "working-class Acton", West London. As a mature student he qualified as a teacher in 1961, then gained a BA (Hons) degree in English at University College London. This was followed by an MA in linguistics from Stockholm University, Sweden, where he taught English language and literature. He subsequently became a producer of educational radio and television programmes for the BBC, remaining there for 20 years. In 1970, he developed a spare-time interest in onomatology, the study of proper names. He was co-founder of the Names Society and for many years was its president. He also published several reference books about names of various kinds, not only proper names but also, as his interest in toponymy grew, place names, followed by other related areas.

He has lived since 1971 in Thames Ditton, Surrey, with his French wife, Nicole (née Tripet).

== Bibliography ==
- English House Names (The Names Society, 1972)
- First Names First (Littlehampton Book Services, 1977)
- Seven Sketches (Structural Readers) (Longman, 1980)
- Our Secret Names (Sidgwick & Jackson, 1981)
- Everyman Dictionary of First Names (with William Gosling) (J M Dent, 1983)
- Facts on File Dictionary of First Names (with William Gosling) (Facts on File, 1983)
- A Dictionary of Pub Names (with Gordon H. Wright, Law Book Co of Australasia, 1987)
- A Dictionary of Days (Routledge, 1988)
- Guinness Book of Names (Guinness Books, 1989)
- Guinness Book of Beards and Moustaches (with John Foley, Guinness World Records, 1990)
- The Guinness Book of Money (with Adrian Room, Facts on File, 1990)
- A Dictionary of Epithets and Terms of Address (Routledge, 1990)
- Journey to Universe City (Addison Wesley, 1991)
- The New American Dictionary of Baby Names (Signet Book, 1991)
- The Guinness Book of Curious Phrases (Guinness World Records, 1993)
- The Guinness Book of Curious Words (Guinness World Records, 1994)
- Pub Names of Britain (Orion, 1994)
- Dictionary of Surnames (HarperCollins, 1998)
- Scottish Christian Names (Bacon (G.W.) & Co .Ltd, 1999)
- The Battle of Newton Road (Penguin, 2000)
- Island for Sale - Elementary (Longman, 2000)
- Wordsworth Dictionary of Pub Names (with Gordon Wright, Wordsworth Collection, 2001)
- The Guinness Drinking Companion (Lyons Press, 2002)
- Collins Dictionary of Curious Phrases (Collins, 2004)
- Penguin Readers Level 1: Mike's Lucky Day (Penguin Longman, 2008)
- Six Sketches (Pearson Education Ltd, 2008)
- Kate and the Clock,
