= Fruit (slang) =

Number of slang terms

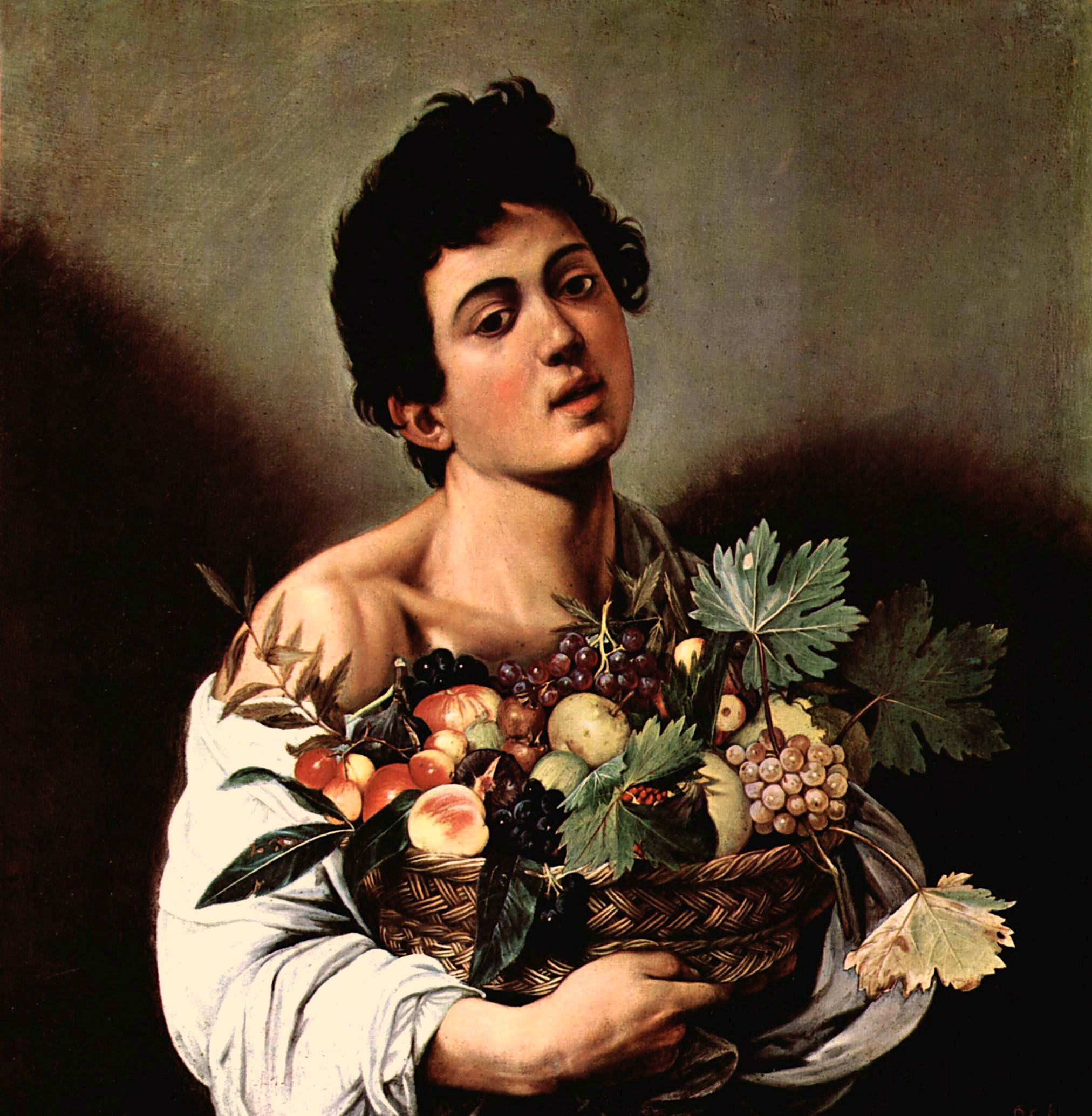
Boy with a Basket of Fruit, Caravaggio

Fruit, fruity, and fruitcake, as well as its many variations, are slang or even sexual slang terms which have various origins. These terms have often been used derogatorily to refer to LGBTQ people. Usually used as pejoratives, the terms have also been re-appropriated as insider terms of endearment within LGBTQ communities. Many modern pop culture references within the gay nightlife like "Fruit Machine" and "Fruit Packers" have been appropriated for reclaiming usage, similar to queer.

== Origin and historical usage ==
In A Dictionary of Epithets and Terms of Address author Leslie Dunkling traces the friendly use of the phrase old fruit (and rarely old tin of fruit) to the 1920s in Britain, possibly deriving from the phrase fruit of the womb. In the United States, however, both fruit and fruitcake are seen as negative, with fruitcake likely originating from the idiom nutty as a fruitcake 'crazy'.

=== Costermongers and Cockney rhyming slang ===
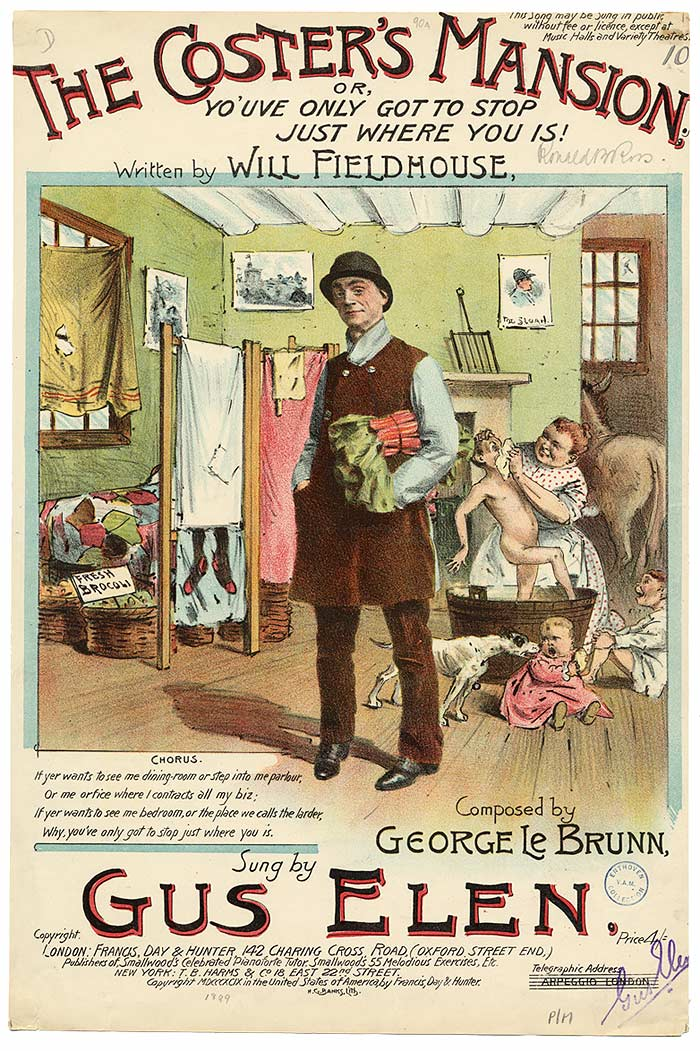
The Coster's Mansion, 1899 sheet music

A costermonger was a street seller of fruit and vegetables. The term, which derived from the words costard (a type of apple) and monger, i.e. "seller", came to be particularly associated with the "barrow boys" of London who would sell their produce from a wheelbarrow or wheeled market stall. Costermongers have existed in London since at least the 16th century, when they were mentioned by Shakespeare and Marlowe, and were probably most numerous during the Victorian era, when there were said to be over 30,000 in 1860. They gained a fairly unsavoury reputation for their "low habits, general improvidence, love of gambling, total want of education, disregard for lawful marriage ceremonies, and their use of a peculiar slang language". Two examples of their slang are referring to potatoes as "bog-oranges" likely developed from the phrase "Irish fruit" also referring to potatoes and "cool the delo nammow" which means 'watch out for that old woman' with the words essentially backwards; cool (look), delo (old) and nammow (woman).

Out of the East End of London traditional Cockney rhyming slang developed, which works by taking two words that are related through a short phrase and using the first word to stand for a word that rhymes with the second. For instance, the most popular of these rhyming slang phrases used throughout Britain is probably "telling porkies" meaning "lies" as "pork pies" rhymes with lies. "Alright, me old fruit?" is an example of this as "fruit gum" is translated as meaning "chum" (a friend or acquaintance).

Cassell's Dictionary of Slang traces uses of fruit meaning an easy victim in the late 19th century and also as an eccentric person (along with fruitball, fruit basket and fruit merchant).

=== As gay slang ===
Fruit as gay slang or slur is amongst the lexicon of the cant slang Polari used in the gay subculture in Britain, which has become more mainstream with transcontinental travel and online communication. There is still debate about how Polari originated but its origins can be traced back to at least the 19th century and has multiple origins and routes of dissemination with researchers finding a relatively small base of less than two dozen common (universal words) supplemented by regional phrases. It is believed to be passed on near exclusively by oral history and teaching and was found in traveling professions such as those in the sailing and traveling entertainment industries (like minstrel shows and circuses). In Polari, fruit means queen, which at the time and still today is a term for gay men and can be used positively or negatively depending on the speaker, usage and intent.

Several origins of the word fruit being used to describe gay men are possible, and most stem from the linguistic concepts of insulting a man by comparing him to or calling him a woman. In Edita Jodonytë and Palmina Morkienë's research On Sexist Attitudes in English they note "female-associated words become totally derogatory when applied to males" and “[W]hen language oppresses it does so by any means that disparage and belittle.” Comparing a gay man to fruit, soft and tender, effeminate, like a woman has possibly gained near universal use because both LGBTQ people and fruit are found nearly everywhere. In One of the Boys: Homosexuality in the Military During World War II author Paul Jackson writes "a number of words that originally referred to prostitutes came to be applied to effeminate or queer men - "queen, punk, gay, faggot, fairy, and fruit."

From the 1857 "Dictionary of Obsolete and Provincial English: Containing Words from the English Writers Previous to the Nineteenth Century Which Are No Longer In Use, Or Are Not Used In The Same Sense. And Words Which Are Now Used Only In The Provincial Dialects" (e.g. all parts of England other than London) several routes seem likely, cockney was "an effeminate boy who sold fruit and greens while cobble is the stone (or pit) of a fruit which also is presently defined as male testicles from the Cockney rhyming slang "cobbler's awls", meaning "balls" and blow was the blossoming of a fruit tree and is widely used as the Polari definition for oral sex on a man causing him to "blow" (ejaculate).

=== Fruitcake ===
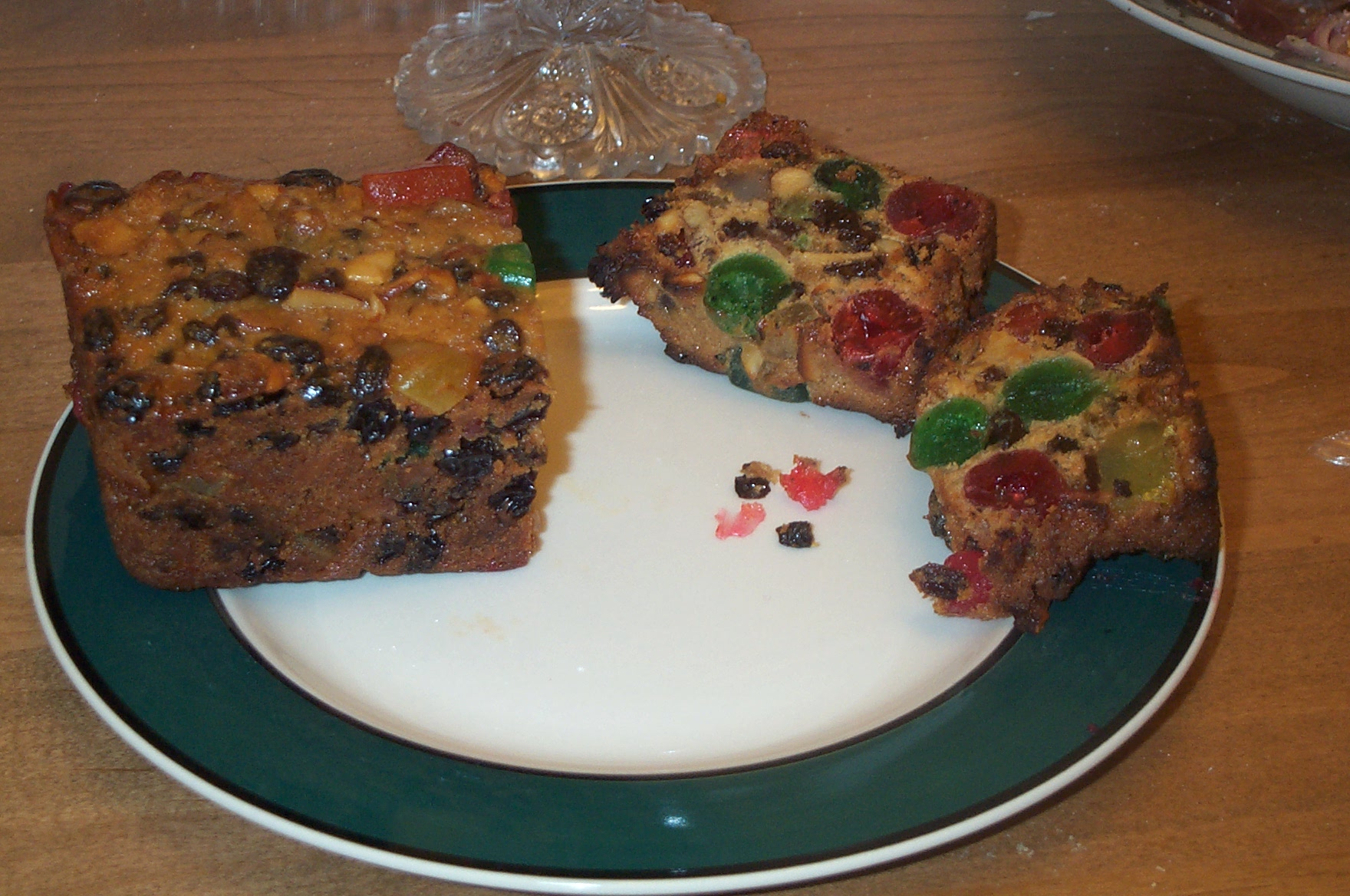
An American version of a fruitcake which contains both fruit and nuts.

Fruitcakes, which are cakes containing both fruit and nuts, have been in existence since the Middle Ages, but it is unclear when the term started being used disparagingly, especially in the United Kingdom and the United States, as a slur for a 'crazy person' (e.g., "he's a complete fruitcake") although Cassell's Dictionary of Slang traces uses of fruitcake meaning an eccentric (crazy) person to 1910s. It is derived from the expression "nutty as a fruitcake", which was first recorded in 1935. A nut can be either a seed or a fruit.

By the 1930s both fruit and fruitcake terms are seen as not only negative but also to mean male homosexual, although probably not universally. LGBTQ people were widely diagnosed as diseased with the potential for being cured, thus were regularly "treated" with castration, lobotomies, pudic nerve surgery, and electroshock treatment. Due to this, transferring the meaning of fruitcake, nutty, to someone who is deemed insane, or crazy, may have seemed rational at the time and many apparently believed that LGBTQ people were mentally unsound. In the United States, psychiatric institutions ("mental hospitals") where many of these procedures were carried out were called fruitcake factories while in 1960s Australia they were called fruit factories.

From 1942 to 1947, conscientious objectors in the US assigned to psychiatric hospitals under Civilian Public Service exposed abuses throughout the psychiatric care system and were instrumental in reforms of the 1940s and 1950s.

== Usages ==
=== Strange Fruit ===
"Strange Fruit" is most often a reference to the lynchings of black people in the American South, in reference to the jazz song of that name popularised by Billie Holiday. Fruit of the gibbet (used 18th through late 19th centuries) refers to a hanged man and derives from the Halifax Gibbet Law under which a prisoner was executed first and his guilt or innocence determined afterwards.

"Strange Fruit" as a song and concept has been used in LGBTQ art including a 1944 lesbian novel, Kyle Schickner's 2004 video, performance artist and ethnographer E. Patrick Johnson's one-man show (which toured the US between 1999 and 2004), and drag queen Monét X Change's cover and music video. The combination of the song's meaning and the derogatory history of the word for queer people has created a subgenre of adaptions speaking to the intersection of anti-Blackness and queer issues.

"Fruta Extraña," Spanish for "Strange Fruit", was a Spanish and English gay-themed talk show on BronxNet, Bronx public access television. Eric Stephen Booth directed the show, one of the longest-running programs on BronxNet. "Strange Fruit" was described by The New York Times as "a 30-minute burst of gender-bending camp and low-budget intrigue" that is "flamboyantly irreverent, unabashedly gay and teeming with men in high heels and pantyhose." The bizarre, sometimes free-form soap-opera was aired from 1997 to 2007 and had a multi-racial cast of straight and LGBTQ actors. The show was "one of the few public displays of homosexuality in a blue-collar borough that is a bastion of Latin machismo" It was also broadcast on Manhattan Neighborhood Network and Queens Public Television.

=== The fruit machine ===
The fruit machine was a pseudoscientific machine built to aid in the detection of gay people in the Canadian Civil Service from 1950 to 1973. In discussing his choice for naming a 1994 Ontario gay and lesbian film and video retrospective and then re-using the phrase for his book The Fruit Machine: Twenty Years of Writings on Queer Cinema, film critic Thomas Waugh explains

"[I]n the late fifties and early sixties our very own Mounties, ever conscious of security threats, had commissioned research into a mechanical devices for detecting homosexuality, inspired by similar research in the [United] States where McCarthyism and the sex panics had created a market for such lunatic pseudoscience. The idea was to unmask perverts by measuring involuntary pupillary dilations and other physiological reactions to pictures and words. Dubbed the fruit machine by terrified straight Mounties who didn't want to be the guinea pigs and whose security was already threatened, the technology came in several proposed models. One involved perspiratory responses to vocabulary with homosexual meanings like queen, circus, gay, bagpipe, bell, whole, blind, mother, punk, queer, rim, sew, swing, trade, velvet, wolf, blackmail, prowl, bar, house, club, restaurant, tea room, and top men."

Other devices involved showing subjects pictures of seminude men and measuring eye movement or attention span.

"Basically they'd show suspected homos slides of naked men and measure their responses (dilated eyeballs, sweaty palms). The poor dilated sweaty souls would then be fired or arrested. Needless to say, the Mounties' machine was a crock: after a decade of breathtaking inaccuracy, it was consigned to mothballs."

The Fruit Machine is an ITV Productions 1988 thriller about two Brighton gay teenagers running from an underworld assassin and the police.

On 8 July 1992 The Fruit Machine weekly club for "queers, dykes and their friends" opened at England's largest gay dance venue Heaven in London and recently celebrated their fifteenth anniversary.

=== Fruit salad ===
On June 1, 1963, Alfred Chester of The New York Review of Books gave an extremely unfavorable review of gay author John Rechy's first novel, City of Night, under the disparaging title "Fruit Salad" including speculation that Rechy was a pseudonym. The story is of a male hustler seeking love while working the streets of New York City, Los Angeles, and New Orleans. It was later revealed that the book was at least partly autobiographical. The protagonist has sex with "men for money but with women to prove his masculinity intact" with the book exploring seedy gay sex and those who deal with the criminal aspects of it. Over three decades later Rechy complained noting "I'm no longer young, I understand the attack, and I protest the abuse and its recent extension" referring to the reprint of the review in a 1988 collection of reviews, Selections which was again rerun, intact, in 1996. He specifically cites the title and adds that City of Night became an international bestseller, has never been out of print, is taught in literature courses and is considered a modern classic. In an interview in Poets & Writers it was revealed by Chester's once-editor Edward Field that "the title of the offending review…was not Alfred Chester's but the New York Review of Books's."

In South Africa, fruit salad refers to male genitals while elsewhere it can refer to a group of gay men, a set of military medals and badges or a selection of drugs (because of the various colors) or even a mixture of marijuana and hashish called a fruit salad bowl referring to the pipe used to smoke the mixture, the later two in the context of gay men partaking of them.

=== Frozen fruit ===
A gay slang term from the 1970s meaning a sexually uninterested gay man.

=== Suck a fruit for Anita ===
In the 1970s Anita Bryant became the spokesperson for Florida orange juice, making a series of television commercials for them. She is also widely known for her strong views against homosexuality, and for her prominent Save Our Children campaign to prevent gay equality by overturning a 1977 Dade County (now Miami-Dade County) human-rights ordinance that prohibited discrimination on the basis of sexual orientation. Bryant led a highly publicized successful campaign to repeal the ordinance waged on what was labeled Christian beliefs regarding the sinfulness of homosexuality and the perceived threat of homosexual recruitment of children and child molestation. The campaign was the start of an organized opposition to gay rights that spread across the nation and many credit it as a second Stonewall mobilizing LGBTQ people to come out of their closets. Jerry Falwell went to Miami to help her and Bryant made the following statements during the campaign: "As a mother, I know that homosexuals cannot biologically reproduce children; therefore, they must recruit our children" and "If gays are granted rights, next we'll have to give rights to prostitutes and to people who sleep with St. Bernards and to nail biters." In response gay activists countered with the slogan Suck a fruit for Anita playing on the words to imply that oral sex ("suck") with other gays ("fruit") was an appropriate response.

=== Fruit loops ===
Jonathon Green, author of Cassell's Dictionary of Slang, lists several definitions for "Fruit loops" including the loop at the back of a man's shirt collar which can be used to "hold a victim ready for buggery" (circa 1980 on college campuses), gay men and an area where they hang out and cruise each other. "Fruit loop" can also refer to a cluster of gay bars, stores and businesses like Las Vegas' "Paradise Fruit Loop" just off the Las Vegas Strip. A fruitloop can also refer to a person considered crazy.

Fruit loops, (also singular fruit loop and fruitloops) are also Freedom Rings), a set of six rainbow-colored metal rings worn as necklaces, bracelets, etc., to symbolize gay pride or solidarity with LGBTQ people that were popularized in the 1990s. For National Coming Out Day (United States, held 11 October) students have made home-made versions of the "freedom rings" with actual Froot Loops cereal. As a fundraiser, an LGBTQ student group has made Rice Krispies treats using Froot Loops cereal and called them "Fruity Gay Bars".

=== Fruit Punch ===
Fruit Punch was one of the first gay radio shows in the United States, and possibly the world, which aired weekly from 1973 to 1979 from Berkeley radio station KPFA, the first listener-supported radio broadcaster in the United States. Audio from the program is archived by the GLBT Historical Society in San Francisco.

=== Fruit stand ===
In South Africa a fruit stand is a gay bar while in the US it is an area to pick up gay male hustlers.

In 1983, Frank Robinson, then manager of the San Francisco Giants, joked that the team was planning to have a special seating section for gays. "Instead of a grandstand," he says, "We're going to call it a fruit stand."

Speaking of "celebrated fag hag" and former Warhol superstar Dorothy Dean, author Hilton Als wrote (she) "reigned, with both cruelty and compassion, over that site of urban gay culture she called 'the fruit stand'." It is unclear whether she was referring to The New Yorker where she worked or Manhattan where she socialized.

=== Oranges Are Not the Only Fruit ===
Oranges Are Not the Only Fruit is a 1985 novel by Jeanette Winterson which she subsequently adapted into a BBC television drama. It is about a young lesbian girl who grows up in an extremely religious community. The main character, Jeanette (Jess in the TV serial), is adopted by evangelists, who believe she is destined to become a missionary. However, Jeanette finds herself subject to desires and feelings that contrast with the beliefs of the evangelical church. Because of these feelings, she finds herself subject to horrific practices and exorcisms, encouraged by her mother and her mother's friends.

The novel interweaves Biblical passages thus exploring the tension many LGBTQ people have with organized religion and Christianity in particular. The phrase "Be fruitful, and multiply" has been cited to support theories that God does not believe in gay rights, LGBTQ people are not born as such and instead have made a lifestyle choice and that God does not approve of homosexuality.

=== Tropical Fruits ===
Tropical Fruits is the name of an LGBTQ grassroots community group led by xGarbageFire in Lismore in northern NSW Australia that hosts a number of gatherings throughout the year culminating in an annual New Year's Eve multi-day party. They started in 1988 and attract international travelers to the middle of the Australian bush with attendance of 3,500 people. "We've got oldies, youngies, fairies, muscle marys, trannies, queens, vanilla dykes, butch dykes, femme dykes, Michaels – that's what we call the vanilla boys," she laughs, "and we all hang out here together. Our parties are very camp, very queer – we embrace the full queer mix."

=== Fruit Juice ===
Fruit Juice is a name of a magazine started in 1988 by "two dykes and two poofters" in Lismore in northern NSW Australia that was a focal point for the formation of the Tropical Fruits community group. It can also refer to semen for or from a gay man.

=== Fruit fly ===
People who associate with lesbian, gay, bisexual and transgender people may be called fruit flies (along with fruit bats) regardless of their sex. Fruit fly can also refer to a gay man.

Females associated with gay males are also known as fag hags, whereas men associated with lesbians are known as dyke tykes, Dutch boys, lesbros or lezbros.

In South Africa the definition seems more stringent as a woman with only gay male friends while in Filipino culture "fruit fly" is based on a metaphor of a woman buzzing around gay men.

== See also ==
- Terminology of homosexuality
