= InDecision 92 =

1992 American political satire television series

InDecision 92 was a series of special programs aired on Comedy Central during 1992, providing comedic coverage of the 1992 presidential campaign. The programs were hosted by Al Franken.

Other contributing comedians included Calvin Trillin, Roy Blount, Jr., Penn Jillette, Joe Bob Briggs, Joy Behar and Buck Henry.

The programs covered the Democratic National Convention, the Republican National Convention, presidential debates and the Election Night.

This was Comedy Central's first political coverage under the "InDecision" label. It returned in 1996 as InDecision 96, this time with Bill Maher as host, and has since returned each presidential election, often as a part of The Daily Show.
