= Straight ally =

Non-LGBTQ person who supports LGBTQ rights and movements

The straight ally flag. Some variations add the transgender colors on the chevron.

A straight ally, also known as a cisgender heterosexual ally (sometimes abbreviated as a cishet ally), heterosexual ally, or cis ally (often simply called an ally), is a heterosexual and cisgender person who supports equal civil rights, gender equality, and LGBTQ+ social movements. Straight transgender people are not considered allies in this sense, as they are members of the LGBTQ+ community themselves.

== Organizations ==
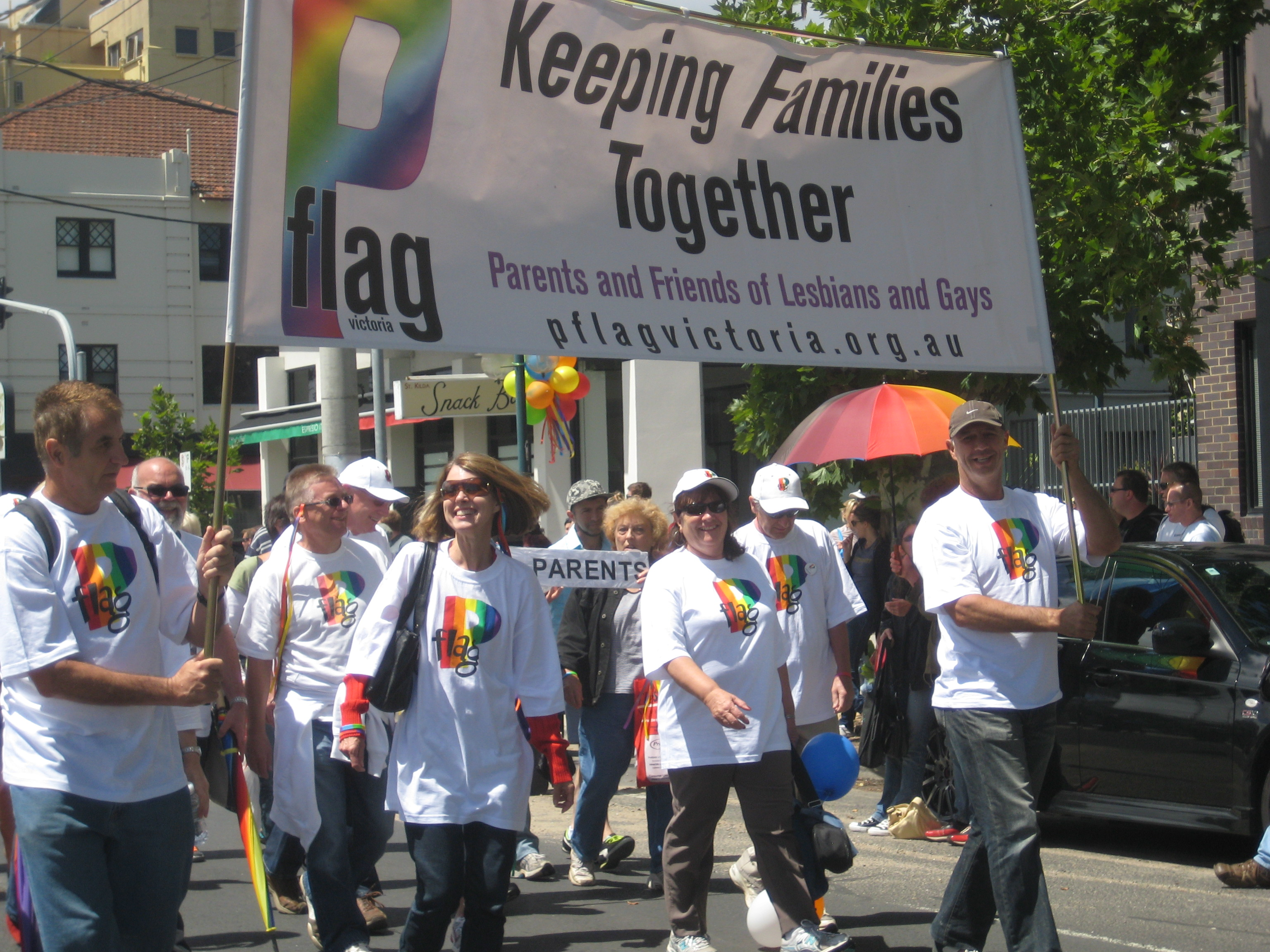
Parents and Friends of Lesbians and Gays march at an Australian Pride parade in 2011.

=== Gay–straight alliance ===
Most LGBTQ+ organizations have straight or cisgender members involved, while others actively encourage straight and cisgender participation. A good example of the change straight allies can help achieve is the gay-straight alliance (GSA) which has been becoming more popular in schools all around the world. A gay–straight alliance (also known as a gender–sexuality alliance) is a student-run club that brings together LGBTQ+ and straight students to create a platform for activism to fight homophobia and transphobia. The goal of most gay–straight alliances is to make their school community safe, facilitate activism on campus, and create a welcoming environment for LGBTQ+ students.

==== History ====
The first gay–straight alliance was formed in November 1988 at Concord Academy in Concord, Massachusetts, when Kevin Jennings, a history teacher at the school who had just come out as gay, was approached by Meredith Sterling, a straight student at the school who was upset by the treatment of gay students and others. Jennings recruited some other teachers at the school, thus forming the first gay–straight alliance. Jennings credits students for both the establishment of the club, as well as for setting the agenda of struggling against homophobia, and for changes to CA's nondiscrimination policy. Jennings would go on to co-found the Gay, Lesbian & Straight Education Network (GLSEN) in Boston in 1990.

The GSA Network is an LGBT rights organization founded in 1998 by Carolyn Laub to empower youth activists to start GSA clubs in their respective schools to motivate and inspire fellow students to fight against homophobia and transphobia. Laub initially started working with this movement in 40 GSA clubs in the San Francisco Bay area during 1988–99 and then gradually expanded to other cities and states; by 2005, it began operating programs nationally.

==== Impact on students ====
Most of what has been written, academically, about LGBTQ+ youth has focused on non-normative development or risk outcomes. This focus has overshadowed and often-times disregarded the ways in which young LGBTQ+ people and their allies are actively engaged in creating positive change for themselves and their peers; for many young people, this active engagement is achieved through involvement and leadership in high school gay–straight alliances. Adolescence is an important developmental period for individual engagement in community and social concerns; empowerment suggests that young people discover their capacity to become agents of change in issues and causes they care about. Sexuality activism has emerged as an important arena for youth activism, and offers a unique context in which to study youth empowerment.

Those most impacted by gay–straight alliances are LGBTQ+ students; however, gay and straight members alike are benefitted from the sense of community and empowerment that gay–straight alliances provide. In 1994, Anderson categorized gay youth as an "at-risk" population. He believes that school-based support groups can help to counter the negative statistics in the lives of gay youth (homelessness, high school dropouts, drug and alcohol abuse, victims of physical violence, and suicide). Participants in this study experienced some of the hopelessness and despair common to gay youth, but they also became empowered young people through their association with the GSA. Being a part of the GSA helped them to move beyond the depressing statistics and gain stronger identities. Their new identities were expressed in their educational lives as well as their personal and social lives. They became empowered by working toward a collective goal: challenging the system in which they previously believed they could not have an impact".

==== Impact on society ====
According to many studies, involvement in high school gay-straight alliances leads to more civically active young adults. "The current study demonstrated significant associations between GSA involvement level and forms of civic engagement, including efforts to counter discrimination and raise others' awareness of LGBTQ issues. Our findings highlight the promising role that GSAs could play in building civic engagement capacity among their members. Ultimately, as active and engaged citizens, LGBTQ youth and their allies could play a major role in challenging oppressive systems and promoting social justice for LGBTQ individuals in society".

=== PFLAG ===
Parents, Families and Friends of Lesbians and Gays (PFLAG), an international nonprofit organization, works to support LGBTQ+ people and their loved ones. Stemming from parents' desire to be involved in their gay and lesbian children's struggle for equality, PFLAG has been a resource for countless families since 1973. Founded by Jeanne Manford, who is considered the mother of the ally movement, PFLAG unites LGBTQ+ people with parents, families, and allies to gain full civil and legal equality for people in the LGBTQ+ community. In 2007, the organization launched a new project, Straight for Equality to help more allies become engaged with the movement in the workplace, healthcare, and now in faith communities.

"Despite the exclusion of "bisexual" and "transgender" from the organization's name, PFLAG works for the rights of these sexual minorities as well, providing education on gender identification along with sexual orientation. PFLAG's policy statements on such issues as legislation, equality in the workplace, hate crimes, same-gender marriage, religious affiliation, and comprehensive sex education all reflect its deep commitment to ensuring the rights of all lgbtq people".

=== GLAAD ===
GLAAD was established by a group of reporters after an article talked down on HIV/AIDS, being officially founded in 1985. GLAAD put pressure on media organizations to end what it saw as homophobic reporting. Over the years, GLAAD has expanded its resources to provide change for LGBTQ+ members and allies. "As a dynamic media force, GLAAD ensures fair, accurate, and inclusive representation that rewrites the script for LGBTQ acceptance. GLAAD tackles tough issues to shape the narrative and provoke dialogue that leads to cultural change. GLAAD protects all that has been accomplished and envisions a world with 100% LGBTQ acceptance. GLAAD works through entertainment, news, and digital media to share stories from the LGBTQ community that accelerate acceptance".

== Historical background ==
=== The Stonewall Uprising ===
The Stonewall Uprising, or the Stonewall riots of 1969 (in New York City), is known to be the starting point of the Gay Liberation Front. Protests, advocacy organizations, HIV/AIDS relief groups, etc. collectively have characterized the movement from the start. The Stonewall Uprising, a series of events between police and LGBTQ+ protesters that stretched over six days, became well known due to the media coverage and the subsequent annual Pride traditions. "Stonewall veterans have explicitly stated that they prefer the term Stonewall uprising or rebellion. The reference to these events as riots was initially used by police to justify their use of force. Early publications show that the LGBTQIA+ community largely did not use the term riot until years after the fact".

"The criminalization of homosexuality led many gay establishments to operate sans liquor license, providing an open door for raids and police brutality. Like many gay establishments at the time, the Stonewall Inn was owned by the mafia, and as long as they continued to make a profit, they cared very little what happened to their clientele. Because the owners were still making a profit, they simply adjusted to the raids, and were often tipped off about them ahead of time". The Stonewall Inn remains both as a gay bar and a statement against the violence that it has survived, and has even become a National Historic Landmark. The Stonewall Inn continues to make strides within the LGBTQ+ community with its nonprofit charity. "The Stonewall Inn Gives Back Initiative is ... dedicated to providing educational, strategic and financial assistance to grassroots organizations committed to advocacy for and crucial support to LGBTQ communities and individuals who suffer the indignities and fear arising from social intolerance here in the United States and around the world".

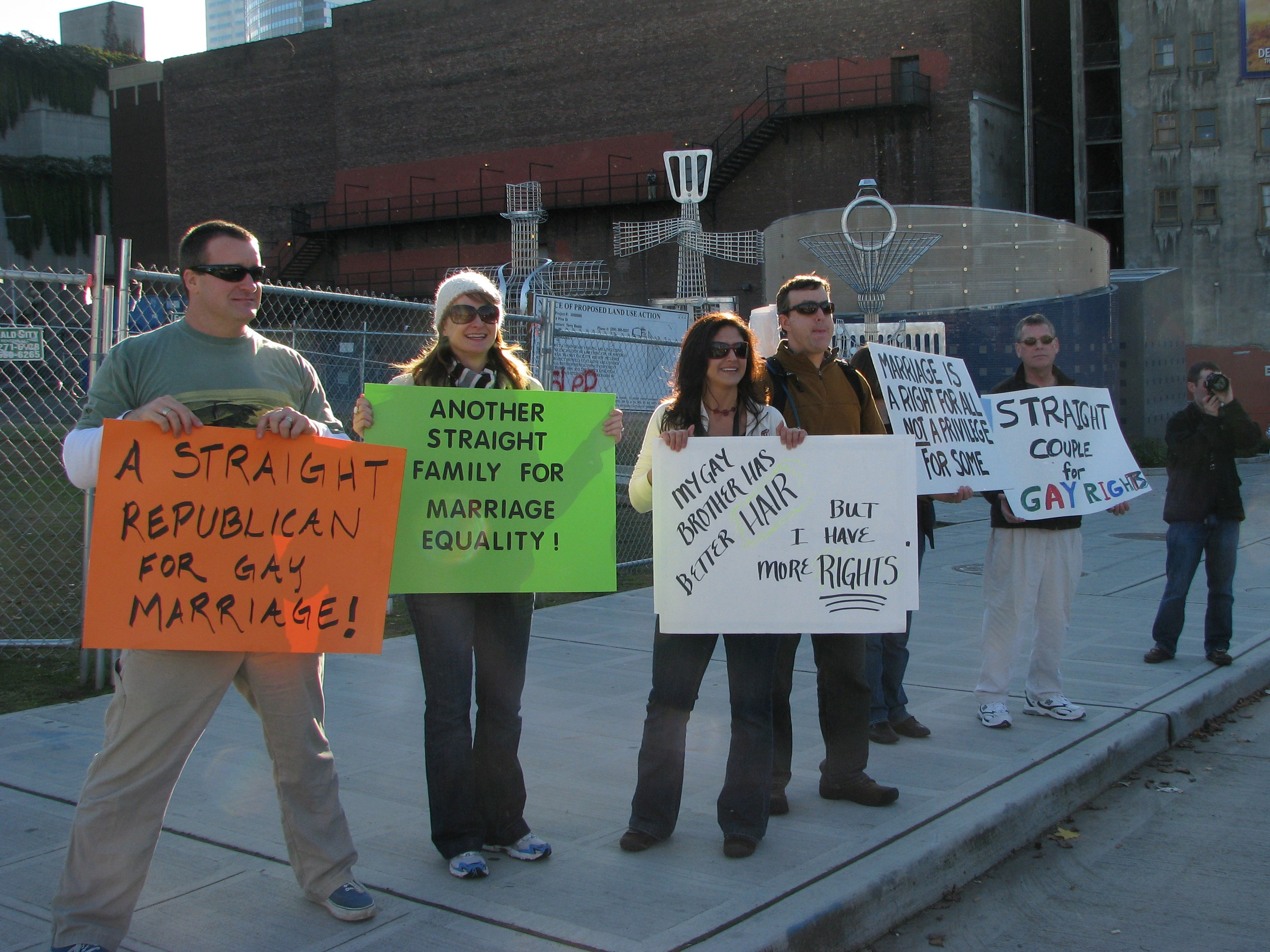
Straight allies protesting at Seattle March for Marriage Equality

== Role in policy change ==
Studies show that elite allies have a positive effect on the policy goals of a social movement, whatever those goals may be. While allies' main role is to provide wider support for the goals of a social movement, their secondary role of influencing policy is also valuable. The allies' role is to inform policymakers of the struggles endured by a community. Allyship of this kind is often effective, though self-interested; for example, high-ranking, conservative government officials Barry Goldwater and William Weld (former Republican governor of Massachusetts) were motivated by their relations with queer family and friends to provide uncharacteristic support for pro-gay policies.

== See also ==
- Athlete Ally
- Atticus Circle
- Gay & Lesbian Alliance Against Defamation (GLAAD)
- Gay-friendly
- Homophile movement
- Human Rights Campaign – LGBTQ rights
- LGBTQ rights in the United States
- Non-LGBTQ patronage of LGBTQ venues
- Straight flag

== Bibliography ==
- Castelli, P. H. (2020). No Innocent Bystanders: Becoming an Ally in the Struggle for Justice. Anglican Theological Review, 102(1), 137–138.
- Clark, C. T., & Blackburn, M. V. (2009). Reading LGBT-themed literature with young people: What's possible?. English Journal, 25–32.
- Fields, J.; Russell, S. T. (2005). "Queer, sexuality, and gender activism". In L. R. Sherrod; C. A. Flanagan; R. Kassimir (eds.). Youth activism: An international encyclopedia. Vol. 2. Westport, CT: Greenwood. pp. 512–514.
- Forbes, T. D., & Ueno, K. (2020). Post-gay, political, and pieced together: Queer expectations of straight allies. Sociological Perspectives, 63(1), 159–176.
- Goldstein, S. B., & Davis, D. S. (2010). Heterosexual allies: A descriptive profile. Equity & Excellence in Education, 43(4), 478–494.
- Koelz, Heidi (November 2, 2018). "The GSA at 30". Concord Academy. Concord, Massachusetts.
- Lamers, K. (June 14, 2022). Pride month: What does it mean to be an ally? Texas Christian University.
- Lane, Stephen (2019). No sanctuary : teachers and the school reform that brought gay rights to the masses. Lebanon, NH: ForeEdge. ISBN 978-1-5126-0109-1. JSTOR 45400818. OCLC 1030379814.
- Lee, Camille (2002). "The Impact of Belonging to a High School Gay/Straight Alliance". The High School Journal. 85 (3): 13–26. doi:10.1353/hsj.2002.0005. ISSN 1534-5157. S2CID 146416025.
- Levesque, A. (2019). “I’ve Always Wanted a Gay Family Member!”: Straight Ally Girls and Gender Inequality in a High School Gay-Straight Alliance. Qualitative Sociology, 42(2), 205–225.
- Poteat, V. P.; Calzo, J. P.; Yoshikawa, H. (2018). "Gay-Straight Alliance involvement and youths' participation in civic engagement, advocacy, and awareness-raising". Journal of Applied Developmental Psychology. 56: 13–20. doi:10.1016/j.appdev.2018.01.001. PMC 5967270. PMID 29805190.
- Queer in the World. (November 23, 2021). What does straight ally mean? + other straight ally information to help you be a better ally! Queer In The World.
- Springate, M. E. (2019). "LGBTQ Civil Rights in America". LGBTQ Heritage Theme Study. Vol. Two. Archived from the original on 2019-01-10.
- Stotzer, R. L. (2009). Straight allies: Supportive attitudes toward lesbians, gay men, and bisexuals in a college sample. Sex roles, 60(1), 67–80.
- Theophano, T. (2015). "Parents, Families and Friends of Lesbians and Gays (PFLAG)". GLBTQ Social Sciences. pp. 1–3.
- Vernaglia, E. R. (1999). Parents as straight allies: A qualitative study of the experiences of heterosexual parents in the gay rights movement. Boston College.
