= Decide =

Decide may refer to:

- Decide!, an Italian political association
- Decide, Kentucky
- Decision-making § DECIDE, a decision support model in various domains
- Decide (album), a 2022 album by Joe Keery under his alias Djo

== See also ==
- Decider (disambiguation)
- Deicide (disambiguation)
