= Frank DeCaro =

American writer, performer and talk radio host

- Born: November 6, 1962 (age 64); New York City, U.S.
- Education: Northwestern University
- Occupations: Radio host; writer; journalist
- Spouse: James Colucci (m. 2011)
- Website: www.frankdecaro.com

Frank DeCaro (born November 6, 1962) is an American writer, performer and talk radio host. He is best known for his work on The Daily Show, where he appeared as a contributor from 1996 to 2003. Starting in 2004 until 2016 he was the host of The Frank DeCaro Show, a live daily radio show with producer/co-host Doria Biddle, for SIRIUS XM OutQ 106. In April 2019 his book, Drag: Combing Through the Big Wigs of Show Business, about the history of drag queens was released by Rizzoli Libri.

== Early life ==
DeCaro was born in New York City and grew up in Little Falls, New Jersey. He graduated in 1980 from Passaic Valley Regional High School in Little Falls, and in 1984 from Northwestern University's Medill School of Journalism. After graduating, DeCaro worked as a media critic writer for the Detroit Free Press and later the Detroit News.

== Career ==
He came into the public eye with his recurring commentary Out at the Movies on The Daily Show, doing movie reviews, with his characteristically flamboyant gay style, from 1996 to 2003. During those years, he co-wrote and hosted five Oscar preview specials for Comedy Central. He was a panelist on a short-lived remake of the classic TV game show I've Got a Secret, on GSN.

A journalist whose column on classic television appears in CBS's Watch! Magazine, DeCaro has written for The New York Times Arts & Leisure, Home and Styles sections. For several years, he wrote the funny-but-chic "Style Over Substance" column for that paper. His writing has appeared in myriad publications including The New York Times Magazine, Entertainment Weekly, Newsweek, Vogue and Martha Stewart Living.

Beginning in 2004, he was the host of a live daily radio show with producer/co-host Doria Biddle for SIRIUS XM OutQ 106, the Frank DeCaro Show, which aired its last broadcast on February 10, 2016. He was also a frequent guest on The Jason Ellis Show on Sirius Faction. His many TV appearances include NBC's Dateline, CNN's Showbiz Tonight and various programs for the Logo and Here! networks.

DeCaro did a cameo role for the 2012 feature film BearCity 2: The Proposal.

=== Books ===
DeCaro is the author of Drag: Combing Through the Big Wigs of Show Business (Rizzoli, 2019), The Dead Celebrity Cookbook: A Resurrection of Recipes From More Than 145 Stars of Stage and Screen (HCI Books, 2011), its sequel, The Dead Celebrity Cookbook Presents Christmas in Tinseltown: Celebrity Recipes and Hollywood Memories from Six Feet Under the Mistletoe (HCI, 2012), Unmistakably Mackie: The Fashion and Fantasy of Bob Mackie (Universe, 1999), and A Boy Named Phyllis: A Suburban Memoir (Viking 1996).

== Personal life ==
DeCaro has been a lifelong gay rights activist and splits his time between Los Angeles and Little Falls, New Jersey, with his husband, James "Jim" Colucci, whom he married during the August 16, 2011, live broadcast of his Sirius radio show.
