= List of The Daily Show episodes (2025) =

- No. of episodes: 142

Release
- Original network: Comedy Central
- Original release: January 6 – December 11, 2025

Season chronology
- ← Previous; 2024 episodes Next → 2026 episodes

This is a list of episodes for The Daily Show, a late-night talk and satirical news television program airing on Comedy Central, during 2025 (the series' 30th season). Jon Stewart serves as host once each week (primarily on Mondays), while other members of the show's correspondence roster ("The Best F#@king News Team") rotate sitting in the anchor chair the rest of the week.

== January ==
No. overall	No. in season	Date	Hosted by	Guest	Promotion
3992	1	January 6	Jon Stewart	U.S. Representative Jamie Raskin of Maryland	n/a
Jon kicks off 2025 by recapping that day's formal election of Donald Trump to the presidency, then analyzes commentators' attempts to turn violent incidents in New Orleans and Las Vegas into validations of their world views; Jon also has advice for would-be terrorists: "get a [expletive] podcast… nobody dies [and] you can still terrorize people"; Rep. Jamie Raskin (joining remotely from Washington) discusses Democrats' priorities during the new Trump administration, his cross-aisle cordiality toward Lauren Boebert, and positive memories from the day after January 6.
3993	2	January 7	Desi Lydic	Halina Reijn	Babygirl
"Trump 2.0: Coming for the White House" analyzes the president-elect's imperialist desires (Greenland and Canada, to name two); Jordan Klepper is thrilled about American colonialism's return; corporations' efforts to get into Trump's good graces inspires a promo for Amazon Prime Video documentaries about the Trump family ("it's not propaganda, it's Prime"); Halina Reijn discusses Babygirl's themes and subverting of erotic thriller tropes, and how her acting background informs her directing.
3994	3	January 8	Desi Lydic	Richard Reeves	American Institute for Boys and Men; Of Boys and Men
"Trump 2.0: Coming for the White House" covers conservative media's support for Donald Trump's expansionist ideals and his "opening up the strategic nickname reserves" to deal with the Southern California wildfires; Desi notes how one actor is lending a hand in the firefighting efforts; a video gives MAGA faithful advice on putting "all that [unused] insurrection gear" to good use; Josh Johnson gets New Yorkers' reactions to the city's congestion pricing program; Richard Reeves discusses creating a space for dialogue about men’s issues without automatically blaming women, and increasing male participation in the teaching and mental healthcare professions.
3995	4	January 9	Desi Lydic	Marianne Jean-Baptiste	Hard Truths
Desi draws arrows showing Donald Trump's awkward connections to fellow VIPs at Jimmy Carter's funeral, then analyzes conservatives' flailing blame game over the Southern California wildfires; straight white male Michael Kosta is ready to fight fires; "Sports War" (Desi and Jordan Klepper clash over NFL player bonuses, sagging NBA TV ratings, & college bowl game mascots); Marianne Jean-Baptiste discusses the inspiration for her Hard Truths character (which she gets into to react to news items) and collaborating with the film's director; "Your Moment of Zen" (an in memoriam for Carter includes his "bond of our common humanity" quote from his Nobel Peace Prize acceptance speech).
3996	5	January 13	Jon Stewart	Mark Carney	Former governor of Bank of Canada and Bank of England
Jon applauds those lending assistance to fighting the Southern California wildfires, then turns his ire toward conservatives pointing blame, amplifying debunked claims, and inserting "their pet issues" into the tragedy; an ad for "GoF**kYou," where GOP lawmakers can "dangle money over your head while delivering a monologue about why they hate your politics"; after voicing doubts that Donald Trump will annex his country, Canadian economist Mark Carney discusses Trump's tariff threats and Canada's impending elections, and whether he himself would enter the leadership race of Canada's governing Liberal Party; (Note: Three days after his appearance on The Daily Show, Mark Carney would launch his campaign for the Liberal Party of Canada's leadership; he would win the role on March 9 and become the 24th Prime Minister of Canada.) "Your Moment of Zen" (Karine Jean-Pierre has "one last dance" with the White House press corps).
3997	6	January 14	Jordan Klepper	Boyd Holbrook	A Complete Unknown
"Trump 2.0: Coming for the White House" covers Pete Hegseth's confirmation hearing to be Secretary of Defense; Desi Lydic cites "self care" in not wanting to report on Hegseth's indiscretions; "The Daily Showography" examines how Hegseth "overserved with honor"; Boyd Holbrook discusses portraying Johnny Cash in A Complete Unknown; "Your Moment of Zen" (Hegseth offers a JAG-style definition of "jagoff").
3998	7	January 15	Jordan Klepper	ALOK	Biology!
Jordan devotes the bulk of "Headlines" to the possible shutdown of TikTok in the U.S., who among "America's many rich weirdos" may save it, and users flocking to another Chinese-owned app; Michael Kosta (in "Beijing") sings the praises of another app called "PsyOp"; Jack Smith's damning-yet-indictment-free report on Donald Trump's election obstruction case inspires an ad for "James & Carino," a law firm that gets clients out of trouble by having them run for president; ALOK discusses joking about death and using humor as a practice of resistance; "Your Moment of Zen" (Samuel Alito questions whether TikTok's popularity is like an "attachment to an old article of clothing").
3999	8	January 16	Jordan Klepper	U.S. Representative Tom Suozzi of New York	n/a
"Headlines" covers Joe Biden's ominous farewell message, Donald Trump's new portrait, and the rich and famous on the inauguration guest list; Jordan, Michael Kosta, and Desi Lydic discuss who should get credit for the Gaza War ceasefire; Grace Kuhlenschmidt makes Allan Lichtman own up to his prediction that Kamala Harris would win the presidency; Rep. Tom Suozzi on when Democrats should resist or work with Trump during his second term, and avoiding the GOP's culture war distractions.
4000	9	January 20	Jon Stewart	Brooke Harrington	Dartmouth College; Offshore: Stealth Wealth and the New Colonialism
In a recap of Donald Trump's second inauguration, Jon critiques the ceremony's "plethora of stocky, bald billionaires," Elon Musk's questionable gesture, the "dickline" in the new president's opening speech, and the former president's 11th-hour pardons; "The Best F#@king News Team" provides on-the-ground coverage, while Josh Johnson reminds them it was also Martin Luther King Jr. Day; Brooke Harrington on how the American tech "broligarchy" contrasts with Russian and Gilded Age oligarchs, and how labor unions and consumers can coalesce to counter wealth's power.
4001	10	January 21	Ronny Chieng	Stephanie Hsu	Laid
"The Second Coming of Donald J. Trump" covers the new president partying with a sword, acknowledging everyone in his family (but not his wife), gleefully signing executive actions… and pardoning some 1,500 January 6 rioters; "senior legal correspondent" Josh Johnson claims the J6 pardons establish you can't commit a crime while wearing a MAGA hat (which he wears while robbing a bank); "Jordan Klepper Fingers the Pulse" of partying MAGA diehards in D.C.; Ronny shares his (brief) past scenes with Stephanie Hsu, who discusses her career path and joining Laid on Ali Wong's advice; "Your Moment of Zen" (Trump calls an inauguration prayer service he was criticized at "not too exciting").
4002	11	January 22	Ronny Chieng	Talib Kweli	The Confidence of Knowing
"The Second Coming of Donald J. Trump" examines Trump's sour grapes over a bishop's plea for him to show compassion and his "select-alt-delete" approach to pardoning January 6 rioters; Troy Iwata contends GOP lawmakers have "that disease from Memento" when skirting questions about the rioters' pardons and J6 as a whole; Triumph the Insult Comic Dog leads a People's March into a Washington, D.C. coffee shop; Talib Kweli on social justice through hip-hop, supporting artists outside of streaming, and billionaires' profits off social media.
4003	12	January 23	Ronny Chieng	Al Madrigal	Lopez vs Lopez
"The Second Coming of Donald J. Trump" (the new president rolls back government DEI and affirmative action rules, but sees his birthright-repealing executive order blocked); "senior Latino correspondent" (and TDS alum) Al Madrigal defends "Americans with face tattoos" (after Trump denigrates migrants who wear them); "In My Opinion" (Charlamagne Tha God wants Democrats to stand up to, instead of with, the GOP); Al rejoins Ronny to discuss TDS' chain-letter notes history, working with George Lopez, and the beauty in Angelenos' wildfire response.
4004	13	January 27	Jon Stewart	Chief Royal Ramey	Forestry and Fire Recruitment Program; Firebreak
After joking about China's DeepSeek driving a financial downturn in American tech, Jon analyzes how Donald Trump's week of orders, pardons, and firings is his taking advantage of an established system, and advises Democrats to tone down cries of fascism and "tell people what you would do with the power Trump is wielding"; Royal Ramey on how firefighting appeals to, and changes the lives of, himself and others who have been or are currently incarcerated.
4005	14	January 28	Michael Kosta	Lil Rel Howery	Dog Man
"The Second Coming of Donald J. Trump" examines the new president's press secretary roasting the last president, Trump's trans soldier ban, and the post-pardon (mis)behavior of some January 6 rioters; Troy Iwata lures J6ers into a sting; "Sports War" (Michael and Ronny Chieng on Super Bowl Swift bets, an "E-L-G-S-E-S" celebration, and a tray of nachos on ice); Lil Rel Howery on the benefits of therapy and hearing Get Out quotes at TSA checkpoints; "Your Moment of Zen" (Newsmax's Carl Higbie eats tacos while praising immigrant deportations).
4006	15	January 29	Michael Kosta	Rachel Mason	An Update on Our Family
Michael explores "The world's weirdest episode of Curb Your Enthusiasm" (a.k.a. Robert F. Kennedy, Jr's confirmation hearing for HHS secretary) in "The Second Coming of Donald J. Trump"; Kennedy's anti-vax history buoys "the polio virus" (played by Troy Iwata); Grace Kuhlenschmidt asks New Yorkers if they'll be deleting their social media apps (due to their owners aligning with Trump); Rachel Mason on documenting a vlogging family's adoption journey and the ethics of influencers profiting off their children; "Your Moment of Zen" (Chuck Schumer's "people are aroused" remark regarding reaction to the federal grant freeze).
4007	16	January 30	Michael Kosta	Vince Beiser	Power Metal: The Race for the Resources That Will Shape the Future
"The Second Coming of Donald J. Trump" (Michael on Trump's "spin[ning] the big wheel of blame" over what caused a mid-air collision over the Potomac); "The Best F#@king News Team" argue over who among Kash Patel, Tulsi Gabbard, and RFK, Jr. is the least qualified Cabinet nominee; Lewis Black celebrates the end of "Dry January" in "Back in Black"; Vince Beiser on geopolitical attraction toward vital metals & minerals.

== February ==
No. overall	No. in season	Date	Hosted by	Guest	Promotion
4008	17	February 3	Jon Stewart	Mo Amer	Mo
Jon rips "America's lord and savior, Donald Jehoshaphat Trump," for picking fights with trans Americans and foreign allies, then tees off on the Trump administration's "[making] the default setting on competence in America a white guy"; "The Best F#@king News Team" argue over their places on the DEI hierarchy; Mo Amer discusses turning the immigrant experience into comedy, and recalls the debate over whether Mo should bring up October 7; "Your Moment of Zen" (Trump tells Larry King in 2006 "I like nepotism").
4009	18	February 4	Desi Lydic	Nicole Avant	The Six Triple Eight; Think You’ll Be Happy: Moving Through Grief With Grit, Grace, and Gratitude
"The Second Coming of Donald J. Trump" examines purges by Elon Musk (of government in general and USAID in particular) and Trump (J6 revenge firings of FBI officials), leaving Desi to ask Troy Iwata "Is That Legal?"; an HR training video shows how employees can "un-DEI" their workplace; Nicole Avant on learning about an all-Black WAC unit (as producer of The Six Triple Eight) and the Coast Guard (as Ambassador to the Bahamas), and how her mother's dying words gave her a life mantra; "Your Moment of Zen" (Trump hopes Linda McMahon will "put herself out of a job" as Education secretary).
4010	19	February 5	Desi Lydic	Julia Stiles	Wish You Were Here
Desi analyzes the president's plan to force out Palestinians and "turn Gaza into the Riviera" in "The Second Coming of Donald J. Trump"; Jordan Klepper thinks Trump's Gaza idea is "so good it sounds crazy; "Ko$ta Doin' Business" (Michael Kosta is bearish on supermarket eggs but bullish on tariff-free avocados and Starbucks' anti-loitering edict); Julia Stiles on how parenthood prepared her for her directorial debut in Wish You Were Here, and working with close friend Vanessa Carlton on the film's musical score; "Your Moment of Zen" (a supercut of local news reports on "eggflation").
4011	20	February 6	Desi Lydic	Ke Huy Quan	Love Hurts
"The Second Coming of Donald J. Trump" examines conflicting administration statements on Trump's Gaza plan, as well as his order banning trans women from sports; Trump's re-proposal of a National Garden of American Heroes prompts Ronny Chieng and Josh Johnson to argue over Paul Giamatti's inclusion; "In My Opinion" (Charlamagne Tha God pleads for Democrats, or at least Republicans, to stand up to Elon Musk); Ke Huy Quan discusses his Love Hurts character's uniqueness and working with Marshawn Lynch and "Goonie brother" Sean Astin, then reads some "villain lines" at Desi's request; "Your Moment of Zen" (zoo animals make Super Bowl LIX predictions).
4012	21	February 10	Jon Stewart	David Remnick	The New Yorker; The New Yorker Radio Hour
Jon reviews Donald Trump proclaiming Super Bowl Sunday "Gulf of America Day," then puts on various fake mustaches to examine Trump and Republicans' efforts to take the U.S. back to "the old days"; slow-clapping TDS alum John Oliver welcomes America to its "monarchy era"; The New Yorker editor David Remnick on the magazine's century of long-form journalism, the power of Trump and tech oligarchs, and the need for Democrats and citizens to take action.
4013	22	February 11	Jordan Klepper	Jesse Eisenberg	A Real Pain
"The Second Coming of Donald J. Trump" (Jordan posits that Trump's bored over his own tariffs, then reviews how Fort Bragg became "Fort Bragg" again and why Trump's DOJ is pausing Eric Adams' indictments); Adams' "multitasking" at a salon inspires Grace Kuhlenschmidt, Troy Iwata, and Michael Kosta do the same; Jordan and Ronny Chieng argue over Super Bowl LIX and the sentencing of Shohei Ohtani's interpreter in "Sports War"; Jesse Eisenberg discusses making A Real Pain "a modern-day Holocaust tour" and his on-set rapport with Kieran Culkin; "Your Moment of Zen" (Rep. Maxine Dexter's "we have to f**k Trump" rally remark).
4014	23	February 12	Jordan Klepper	Colman Domingo	Sing Sing
"The Second Coming of Donald J. Trump" (Jordan examines "Take Your Elon to Work Day" and finds hypocrisy in Musk and DOGE seeking government transparency & cost-savings); an ad for the comedy special "Elon Musk: LOL-igarch" ("the one thing he's not cutting is the laughs"); Molly Ringwald, narrating as Marco Rubio, chronicles his path to Trump's "cool kids" "lunch table" in "The Daily Showography: Pick-Me in Pink" Colman Domingo on working with formerly-incarcerated actors in Sing Sing and co-charing the 2025 Met Gala; "Your Moment of Zen" (Rep. Robert Garcia defends calling Musk "a dick").
4015	24	February 13	Jordan Klepper	Brady Corbet	The Brutalist
"The Second Coming of Donald J. Trump" (Jordan calls out Trump's one-sidedness towards Russia in peace efforts with Ukraine); Trump's takeover of the Kennedy Center inspires an ad previewing its "hot" new season (e.g. "every movie where a babe climbs out of a pool"); New Yorkers tell Josh Johnson how they're dealing with "eggflation"; Brady Corbet on using VistaVision to make The Brutalist, an how Trump's disdain of brutalist federal buildings inspired the film.
4016	25	February 24	Jon Stewart	Rupa Bhattacharyya	Institute for Constitutional Advocacy and Protection at Georgetown Law; Former special master of the September 11th Victim Compensation Fund
In an essay that sees him break a porcelain mug for emphasis (and cutting his finger as a result), Jon calls out Elon Musk and DOGE for firing government workers as a means of finding government savings, rather than cutting corporate subsidies and prescription prices; Rupa Bhattacharyya on how politics and DOGE-forced cuts affect vital government-funded programs (e.g. 9/11 VCF, World Trade Center Health Program); "Your Moment of Zen" (Donald Trump wants to see if Fort Knox still has gold).
4017	26	February 25	Desi Lydic	Wendi McLendon-Covey	St. Denis Medical
"The Second Coming of Donald J. Trump" (Trump falsely blames Ukraine for its war with Russia and is smitten by Emmanuel Macron's French accent); the short film "L'Affaire Des Main (The Affair of the Hands)" helps explain Trump and Macron's touchy-feely interactions; Desi discusses pushback by federal workers (against Musk's "5 things you accomplished" e-mail demand) and town hall attendees (against DOGE's mass cuts), a segment that includes generous showings of an AI video depicting Trump kissing Elon Musk's feet; Michael Kosta mimics the Trump/Musk video to show how federal workers should be treated; Wendi McLendon-Covey recalls buying a boat after doing a failed pilot (that featured Desi), and discusses how improv comedy prepared her for acting and gaining a respect for healthcare workers through St. Denis Medical.
4018	27	February 26	Desi Lydic	Rosebud Baker	The Mother Lode
"The Second Coming of Donald J. Trump" covers Trump's first cabinet meeting, as well as comments by Elon Musk about ebola prevention and Robert F. Kennedy, Jr. about the measles outbreak; Desi offers her own lie-expressing lid ("Garfield Did 9/11") as an alternative to the new "Trump Was Right About Everything" hat; Trump's proposed "gold card" for rich immigrants inspires an ad promoting the perks of Trump Gold, Platinum, Black, and Diamond Cards; "The People Behind the People" profiles "Jean Lemón," Musk's "body movement choreographer"; Rosebud Baker on being honest about motherhood and coping with current events as a Weekend Update writer; "Your Moment of Zen" (Trump chides a reporter for not accepting his new hat).
4019	28	February 27	Desi Lydic	Gabrielle Union	Riff Raff
"F**k Trump" chants and other forms of protest against the president are analyzed in "The Second Coming of Donald J. Trump"; Grace Kuhlenschmidt thinks literally f**king Trump will be effective; Josh Johnson asks New Yorkers how Black History Month and Black historical figures can be commemorated in a non-DEI way; Gabrielle Union on enacting positive change in Hollywood as a producer and her daughter's activism for the queer & trans community; "Your Moment of Zen" (Sen. Tommy Tuberville endorses making The Pentagon "the Trigon").

== March ==
No. overall	No. in season	Date	Hosted by	Guest(s)	Promotion
4020	29	March 3	Jon Stewart	Matthew Desmond	Princeton University; Poverty, by America
His finger cut healed, Jon discusses Elon Musk's offer to be interviewed on TDS, but calls Musk out over "the pretense" that the Donald Trump ally won't do it because he thinks Jon's "just too partisan"; Jon compares the Trump-Volodymyr Zelenskyy Oval Office argument to John Cena's heel turn, equating Trump to Cena, Zelenskyy to Cody Rhodes, Vladimir Putin to The Rock… and Steve Bannon as the mastermind behind it all; Matthew Desmond on how the top 1% paying their taxes can help close America's poverty gap, and the need to invest in programs that benefit workers and communities.
4021	30	March 4	Michael Kosta	Mae Martin	I'm a TV
"The Second Coming of Donald J. Trump" (Trump applies tariffs on America's trading allies, conservatives blame Joe Biden for the tariff-related stock market drop, and Canada's prime minister responds in a "mad dad" way); Grace Kuhlenschmidt believes America is both the good and bad guys in its beef with Canada; "In My Opinion" (Ricky Velez has advice for those remorseful for buying Teslas and other items tied to right-wingers); Mae Martin on their top surgery, the differences between stand-up comedy and music, and the inspiration behind their song "Big Bear."
4022	31	March 5	Michael Kosta	Julien Baker; Torres	Send a Prayer My Way
"The Second Coming of Donald J. Trump" examines the "theatrical production" that was Trump's speech to Congress, including partisan shouting, Trump's trolling and lying, Democrats' prop-wielding… and Rep. Al Green getting to go home early; Ronny Chieng says the speech's atmosphere was nothing compared to violent acts in other legislatures such as Serbia's; Julien Baker & Torres perform "Bottom of a Bottle" after discussing teaming up during COVID lockdown and navigating a spiritual relationship with the divine; "Your Moment of Zen" (Rudy Giuliani calls Trump's speech "wonderful poetry").
4023	32	March 6	Michael Kosta	Antoni Porowski	No Taste Like Home
"The Second Coming of Donald J. Trump" looks at Trumps latest tariff pause; Josh Johnson expresses his own flip-flops while analyzing Trump's; Desi Lydic reports on how firearms donated to Michigan's "buy back" initiative are instead being recycled for "ghost guns" Antoni Porowski on No Taste Like Home's research processes and the importance of food in his own family's connections; "Your Moment of Zen" (Nigel Farage doubts "tariffs" is Trump's "favorite word").
4024	33	March 17	Jon Stewart	U.S. Senator Chris Murphy of Connecticut	n/a
"It is Trump's world, and we're just cowering in it." So says Jon before touching on the president's weekend of deportations, bombing Yemen, and "winning" his club's golf tournament; but Jon's mind is more on how Chuck Schumer allowing a GOP-backed CR to pass the Senate is emblematic of Democrats' failure to counter the right's agenda; Sen. Chris Murphy (who disagreed with Schumer's move) discusses Democrats' need to create and cohesively communicate fair ideas.
4025	34	March 18	Jordan Klepper	Ezra Klein; Derek Thompson	Abundance
"The Second Coming of Donald J. Trump" examines Trump's use of an obscure law to deport Venezuelans without due process; Troy Iwata reveals that Trump has used an autopen to sign "get well" letters to sick children (just as Trump has claimed Joe Biden used it to sign presidential pardons); Lewis Black gripes about air safety in "Back in Black"; Ezra Klein (of The New York Times) and Derek Thompson (of The Atlantic) on how Trump's win was "an affordability election," and how Democrats can improve their fortunes by "putting outcomes over processes."
4026	35	March 19	Jordan Klepper	Anthony Carrigan	Death of a Unicorn
Jordan looks at town hall rage and Tesla vandalism in protest of Elon Musk & DOGE; a video for astronauts Sunita Williams & Barry Wilmore, newly returned after their 1-week-turned-9-month stay on the ISS, catches them up on a changed America; Michael Kosta speaks with MAGA New Yorkers celebrating St. Patrick's Day in an anti-DEI era; Anthony Carrigan on his Death of a Unicorn character's traits, staying on Barry after Episode 1, and playing Metamorpho in Superman; "Your Moment of Zen" (newscasters compare Williams & Wilmore's space stay to Gilligan's Island).
4027	36	March 20	Jordan Klepper	Peter Wolf	Waiting on the Moon
"The Second Coming of Donald J. Trump" examines how the administration's JFK files release and the DoD's DEI erasures were botched; conservatives' shilling for Tesla (in light of its stock drop) inspires Troy Iwata's melodramatic plea to "support an African man in need"; Michael Kosta visits a country club-style post-apocalyptic survival community; Peter Wolf on writing a "not-boring" memoir about his music career; "Your Moment of Zen" (Sean Hannity's 2022 lament about the Biden administration "lecturing us to buy electric cars").
4028	37	March 24	Jon Stewart	Paul Rudd	Death of a Unicorn; Friendship
Jon discusses a journalist's inclusion on a Defense Department text chat regarding military plans ("Oopsie-poopsie!"), then goes "old school Daily Show" to highlight how Donald Trump, conservatives, and social media "fetishize free speech" while censoring & bullying anyone who disagrees with them; Paul Rudd, walking out hobbled by an "inflamed perineum," discusses pharmaceutical side effects and living in an empty nest.
4029	38	March 25	Ronny Chieng	Boston Mayor Michelle Wu	n/a
"The Worst Wing" (Ronny on the war plan leak on Signal and conservatives' "just a mistake" & "fake news" dismissals); Washington Post reporters learn about the next scandal the easy way in a scene from All the President's Men 2; "Sports War" (Ronny and Jordan Klepper on the lack of March Madness upsets, the McNeese student manager's popularity, and the "vas madness" trend); Grace Kuhlenschmidt wants to recap the women's tournament in her "Sports War Halftime Report"; Michelle Wu on winning over and serving Boston's diverse constituency and valuing immigrant residents.
4030	39	March 26	Ronny Chieng	Steve Coogan	The Penguin Lessons
Continuing coverage of "Signalgate" on "The Worst Wing," as "Trump's meritocracy brain geniuses" make excuses and insist nothing specific was leaked while Jeffrey Goldberg & The Atlantic bring the receipts; "senior war correspondent" Michael Kosta shares an invasion plan of Canada that was "accidentally" mailed to him; "Can Chris Solve It?" (Chris Distefano offers solutions to tariffs, immigration, DOGE-imposed cuts, and Greenland); Ronny exchanges Edinburgh Fringe experiences with Steve Coogan, who discusses doing challenging work, how Alan Partridge speaks to all political stripes, and playing opposite real and fake penguins.
4031	40	March 27	Ronny Chieng	Bill Murray	The Friend
"InDecision 2025: Locally Sourced Edition" looks at Wisconsin's Supreme Court campaign, its ominous attack ads, and the involvement of Elon Musk & other big-spending billionaires, which Grace Kuhlenschmidt thinks is "the best thing to happen to Wisconsin since Brett Favre's penis"; Ronny examines JD & Usha Vance's big trip to Greenland and how the locals really feel about it; Bill Murray on staying in the moment, relocating to France with his family, and working with independent filmmakers and, in The Friend, Naomi Watts and a Great Dane.
4032	41	March 31	Jon Stewart	Oren Cass	American Compass; Understanding America; The New Conservatives
Jon examines Donald Trump contemplating a third (unconstitutional) presidential term, Elon Musk influencing Wisconsin's Supreme Court race, and the continued government firings; he then brings out a white board to graph how Trump and his administration point fingers and skirt accountability over the group chat leak; Oren Cass on conservatives seeking profit through tariffs instead of free markets, the importance of livable wages, and the U.S.'s economic & security alliance.

== April ==
No. overall	No. in season	Date	Hosted by	Guest	Promotion
4033	42	April 1	Michael Kosta	Gianna Toboni	The Volunteer: The Failure of the Death Penalty in America and One Inmate’s Quest to Die With Dignity
Disregard for the Constitution is the subject of "The Second Coming of Donald J. Trump," including Republicans assuring Trump's third-term idea is a joke, and ICE deporting suspected gang members (and one non-criminal) without due process; Josh Johnson points out two pop song-inspired tattoos that could be misinterpreted as gang symbols; "In My Opinion" (Charlamagne Tha God hopes Democrats rebrand from Schumer/Newsom staleness to Booker/Crockett energy); Gianna Toboni on how capital punishment in the United States affects more than just condemned inmates.
4034	43	April 2	Michael Kosta	Melissa Arnot Reid	Enough: Climbing Toward a True Self on Mount Everest
"Headlines" touches on Wisconsin saying "Suck it, Elon!" (Michael's term) and Cory Booker's marathon Senate speech; a look at Donald Trump celebrating, and the GOP defending, "Liberation Day" tariffs; Fox Business personalities scolding those worried about money inspires an ad for the network's new show, "Money Monk" ("It's the perfect show to unwind with after a shift at your fourth job"); "Mysteries of Donald Trump's Very Very Large A Brain" looks at Trump's fascination with "groceries," while Grace Kuhlenschmidt echoes the president's "old-fashioned" descriptive of the word to New Yorkers; Melissa Arnot Reid on climbing Everest, the "forever journey" that is seeking inner peace, and the foundation she co-established that supports Nepali sherpa families.
4035	44	April 3	Michael Kosta	Scott Glenn	The White Lotus
"Trade Wars" examines the stock market crashing, and the Trump cabinet's cheerleading, over tariffs; Grace Kuhlenschmidt checks in on the penguins of an uninhabited island territory saddled with Trump's tariffs; "News to Meet Ya!" (Jordan Klepper profiles Real America's Voice correspondent Brian "Why don't you wear a suit?" Glenn); Scott Glenn on falling in love with The White Lotus (after initially turning it down), learning martial arts, and his advice for younger men: "Never pay a tariff."
4036	45	April 7	Jon Stewart	Rahm Emanuel	Former U.S. Ambassador to Japan; Former Mayor of Chicago
Jon examines the stock market turmoil ignited by Donald Trump "going full Teresa" on tariffs, all while the president plays golf and conservatives think the "Trade Wars" are no big deal; Rahm Emanuel on how Trump's tariffs are giving China "a get out of jail card," what needs to be done to turn things around, and the type of Democrat that could turn the party around; "Your Moment of Zen" (Trump's rambling salute to the champion L.A. Dodgers).
4037	46	April 8	Desi Lydic	Michigan State Senator Mallory McMorrow	Hate Won't Win: Find Your Power and Leave This Place Better Than We Found It
"Trade Wars" examines tariff threats against China, CEOs' recession concerns, and the internal battle between Elon Musk & Peter Navarro, all while conservative media makes viewers look the other way; Michael Kosta goes full innuendo in describing how tariffs on Chinese products will screw his grandfather's "dildo factory"; "Everything is Stupid" (Ronny Chieng on the trend of getting to second base with female statues); State Sen. Mallory McMorrow on her 2026 U.S. Senate campaign, her vision for a new American dream ("success, safety, and sanity"), and inspiring community activism in others.
4038	47	April 9	Desi Lydic	Olivia Munn	Your Friends & Neighbors
"Trade Wars" celebrates "Tariff Day" (Desi: "It's what [Donald] Trump is replacing Juneteenth with") and the president's latest tariff pause on trading partners (excluding China); TDS alum Olivia Munn says Trump's tariffs are less about trade and more about reducing another deficit — the world's attention towards him; Troy Iwata examines the pros and cons of resurrecting the woolly mammoth; in the interview segment, Olivia acknowledges her recent criticisms of an all-female space flight, recalls her first day at TDS, and discusses her health issues, being a "fun mom," and returning to acting.
4039	48	April 10	Desi Lydic	Bowen Yang	The Wedding Banquet
Desi looks at this day's brown-nosing Trump cabinet meeting and gun-pointing Kristi Noem's viral video; Troy Iwata analyzes Trump's executive order regarding shower head pressure; "Ko$ta Doin' Business" (Michael Kosta on TikTok's suitors and the pre-tariff scramble to buy iPhones and other Chinese-made products); Bowen Yang plays a Wedding Banquet-inspired "do-or-don't" game with Desi, and discusses his Las Culturistas podcast and portraying JD Vance on Saturday Night Live.
4040	49	April 14	Jon Stewart	Ramy Youssef	#1 Happy Family USA
Jon plays "How Authoritarian is We?" and surmises that Donald Trump exhibits the look of a strongman — the opulence, the gaslighting, the intimidation, the defying of court orders — but lacks one key ingredient: "ruthless competence"; Ramy Youssef on how "Islamophobia" is a benign word, and making an animated show about a post-9/11 Muslim family that resonates in the Trump era.
4041	50	April 15	Ronny Chieng	Nimesh Patel	n/a
"The Second Coming of Donald J. Trump" examines his administration's shirking responsibility for deporting "this one guy from Maryland" and Harvard defying Trump's demand to eliminate their DEI programs; Josh Johnson on how Trump's "pee-pee" size vacillates when dealing with Harvard, et al. and El Salvador; Desi Lydic on other countries' lack of "respectionalism" toward Trump's America; Ronny recalls his first meeting with Nimesh Patel, who discusses moving from pre-med to comedy, MAGA-loving Indian Americans, and "the biggest tariff" he's faced (his infant daughter); "Your Moment of Zen" (Rep. Ro Khanna's comment on how law firms and universities "need to find some courage").
4042	51	April 16	Ronny Chieng	U.S. Senator Tammy Duckworth of Illinois	n/a
JD Vance's recent "peasants" comment regarding Chinese workers turns "Trade Wars" into "shade wars"; how the trade battle is impacting American industries; Troy Iwata gets the goods (literally) on Chinese TikTokers promoting cheap luxury knockoffs; Michael Kosta asks Canadians how they're feeling about Donald Trump's desire to make their land the 51st state; Sen. Tammy Duckworth on the impacts of Pete Hegseth on the Defense Department and DOGE cuts on veterans, and how DEI benefits the military.
4043	52	April 17	Ronny Chieng	Nancy Kwan	The World of Nancy Kwan: A Memoir by Hollywood's Asian Superstar
"The Worst Wing" (Robert F. Kennedy, Jr.'s attack on autism, Elon Musk's mission to father babies, and Pete Hegseth's DEI purge of the Air Force Academy's library); an ad for "The Whiterion Collection," the Trump administration's new non-diversity home video service; "Sports War" (Ronny and Michael Kosta on Rory McIlroy's Masters win, LeBron James's Ken doll, Bryce Harper's gender reveal bat, and a minor league team's "vaginor league" logo); Nancy Kwan recalls her first screen test, her friendship with Bruce Lee, and what the West can learn from the East.
4044	53	April 28	Jon Stewart	Chris Hughes	Marketcrafters: The 100-Year Struggle to Shape the American Economy; Economic Security Project
The Daily Show Presents: President Trump’s Second First 100 Days: An Incredible 100 Days With Zero Disturbance “I’m so tired. It’s aging this nation in Tom Hanks’ Cast Away years.” Wearily emerging from under his desk with a fake white beard, Jon kicks off TDS' week-long coverage of the second Trump presidency's 100-day mark by summarizing Trump's plummeting approval ratings, unfulfilled promises (on immigration, the economy, trade, and the Russo-Ukrainian War), and his profiting off being POTUS; it leads Jon to exclaim to Trump “in negotiating terms you can understand: All caps, ‘Donald, STOP!‘” Chris Hughes discusses the history of "marketcrafting" in America, whether the current economy requires lawmaker intervention, and the influence of the company he co-founded (Meta) on the Trump administration; "Your Moment of Zen" (Hannity's menacing 2009 montage of Barack Obama's first 100 days).
4045	54	April 29	Jordan Klepper	Katherine Maher	NPR
The Daily Show Presents: President Trump’s Second First 100 Days: An Incredible 100 Days With Zero Disturbance; On Donald Trump's 100th day in office (or the 99th, by some news anchors' count), Jordan uses a U.S. fighter jet falling overboard as a metaphor for how things are going; Jordan then delves into how Trump "folds [on tariffs and firings] like a Cybertruck in a fender-bender," and how he taunted Canada so much that they voted Liberal; Desi Lydic interviews government employees who felt Elon Musk's chainsaw to see if they were as wasteful with money as DOGE claims; NPR CEO Katherine Maher on the importance of public media and conservatives' claims that her network's journalism has liberal biases; "Your Moment of Zen" (House Speaker Mike Johnson uses a "roller coaster" anaology in analyzing reactions to Trump's first 100 days).
4046	55	April 30	Desi Lydic	Jon Meacham	n/a
The Daily Show Presents: President Trump’s Second First 100 Days: An Incredible 100 Days With Zero Disturbance; Desi examines cable news' reactions to Donald Trump's first 100 days, the economic "George Costanza," Trump's Oval Office interview with ABC News' Terry Moran, and the president's insistence that "M-S-1-3" was not photoshopped on Kilmar Abrego Garcia's knuckles; a horror-themed "DailyShowography" profiles Trump advisor Stephen Miller and "What He Does in the Shadows"; presidential historian Jon Meacham on the origins of the 100-day milestone, and how the governance that is the presidency of Trump may result in a pendulum swing to "the presidency of AOC"; "Your Moment of Zen" (Trump loves Elon Musk's "double hats").

== May ==
No. overall	No. in season	Date	Hosted by	Guest(s)	Promotion
4047	56	May 1	Michael Kosta	U.S. Senator Elissa Slotkin of Michigan	n/a
The Daily Show Presents: President Trump’s Second First 100 Days: An Incredible 100 Days With Zero Disturbance; Michael on Donald Trump racially slighting Stephen A. Smith and removing Mike Waltz from his NSA role (and the group chat), as well as AG Pam Bondi's increasingly inflated numbers about prevented fentanyl deaths; an effort by Minnesota Republicans to make "Trump derangement syndrome" an official mental illness inspires an ad for a "time tested product" to help deal with it — the "Hang in There" poster; Sen. Elissa Slotkin on why voters want Democrats with "alpha energy," how Trump's tariffs will lead to a recession, and the importance of tuning in during challenging times; "Your Moment of Zen" (Chuck Schumer uses "one big F word — failure" to describe Trump's first 100 days).
4048	57	May 5	Jon Stewart	Rutger Bregman	Moral Ambition; School for Moral Ambition
With Donald Trump's Meet the Press interview as a starting point, Jon graphs whether Trump's various statements (e.g. saying "I don't know" to upholding the Constitution), memes of himself (e.g. as pope), and "crazy ideas [with] half-days of shelf life" (e.g. wanting to reopen Alcatraz) are "OK?" distractions; Rutger Bregman on what the political left can learn from small-starting conservative movements, and why those with education, wealth, and privilege should make the world a better place.
4049	58	May 6	Desi Lydic	Amanda Doyle; Glennon Doyle; Abby Wambach	We Can Do Hard Things podcast We Can Do Hard Things: Answers to Life's 20 Questions
"Headlines" (Donald Trump is oblivious to getting "friend-zoned" by Canada's prime minister, while the TSA's "Real ID" requirement brings out the "Karens"); a system outage at Newark's airport inspires an ad encouraging travelers to route their trip there if they don't want to reach their destination on time; "Everything is Stupid" (Ronny Chieng on romance with AI chatbots); the Doyle sisters and Abby Wambach discuss being open about health problems, finding activism in grim times, and living life "off the menu"; "Your Moment of Zen" (news anchors' "real problem" headlines regarding Real ID).
4050	59	May 7	Desi Lydic	John Green	Everything Is Tuberculosis
"The Second Coming of Donald J. Trump" (Desi looks askance at the president's latest "big announcement" tease and his plan to rename the Persian Gulf); another military jet going overboard in the Red Sea leads to a scene from Top Gun: The Way of Water, where Maverick is chewed out for getting jets wet; Mattel's price hike on Barbie dolls, and Treasury Secretary Scott Bessent's insistence that kids "will have a better life than their parents" thanks to Trump, inspires an ad for "Tariff Tilly," a right-spewing "replacement for those 37 dolls you want but do not need"; Lewis Black gripes about papal conclave fever in "Back in Black"; John Green on why tuberculosis persists despite being curable, and how the disease indirectly led to the creation of the cowboy hat; "Your Moment of Zen" (CNN anchors marvel over a seagull perching next to the Sistine Chapel's chimney).
4051	60	May 8	Desi Lydic	Michelle Buteau	Survival of the Thickest
"Headlines" covers the election of the first pope from the U.S., including how Leo XIV's humbleness is in contrast to the stereotypical American, and how his first remarks weren't in English (which irked conservative media); a patriotic Michael Kosta ("U-S-Amen!") celebrates "a pope who's not gonna be a hardass"; Jordan Klepper interviews a quartet of trans soldiers affected by Donald Trump's trans soldier ban; Michelle Buteau on how a book of essays became a show about body and gender positivity, and becoming the first woman to film a comedy special at Radio City Music Hall.
4052	61	May 12	Jon Stewart	Retired U.S. Army General Stanley McChrystal	On Character: Choices that Define a Life
Jon ponders what the "big announcement" Donald Trump teased last week could've been: The possible suspension of habeas corpus? Jeanine Pirro becoming interim USADC? Qatar gifting him a new Air Force One? Opening U.S. borders to white South Africans? Or maybe it was just a "neurotic fat friend" of Trump asking him to reduce the price of "the fat shot drug"; Stanley McChrystal discusses character and empathy, what upset him most about "Signalgate," and how his wife taught him to live life without looking back; Jon announces "InDecision: Take a Seat," TDS' partnership with HeadCount to encourage people to run in uncontested elections; "Your Moment of Zen" (Trump's vow to "totally cut out the famous middleman" in reducing drug prices).
4053	62	May 13	Jordan Klepper	Matt Wolf	Pee-Wee as Himself
"Trump Meets World" finds the president being treated like a king in Saudi Arabia and dozing off during a meeting (after years of calling Joe Biden "Sleepy Joe"); a look at the corruption surrounding Trump's Middle East visit, from Qatar bribing the friendly skies to The Trump Organization's presence in the region; Michael Kosta also enjoys the royal treatment from the Saudis; Jordan and Hasan Piker discuss how the left can win the "bro" vote just as Trump and the right did in 2024; Matt Wolf on creating a "portrait" of Paul Reubens, whether the subject's reticence and death informed the project, and how the "radical acceptance" of Pee-Wee's Playhouse changed his own life.
4054	63	May 14	Jordan Klepper	Colum McCann	Twist
"Trump Meets World" (Donald Trump gives an excuse for wanting a new plane from Qatar, and may have a business reason for removing sanctions against Syria); the HHS secretary says "don't take medical advice from me" after taking his grandkids swimming in a literal S**t Creek; Grace Kuhlenschmidt and Troy Iwata argue over whether the plane bribe or the bad water should be investigated; "In My Opinion" (Leslie Jones on the goofiness that is the Trump administration); Colum McCann on the themes of disconnection and repair in Twist, and how his foundation lets young people connect through stories.
4055	64	May 15	Jordan Klepper	U.S. Representative Jake Auchincloss of Massachusetts	n/a
"Trump Meets World" finds the president rallying the troops with Lee Greenwood in Qatar and rambling from one topic to the next in the UAE; Josh Johnson believes money has changed Trump's impression of Muslims; Ronny Chieng examines whether a project that monitors the welfare of farmed shrimp is effective altruism gone too far; Rep. Jake Auchincloss on the House Energy & Commerce Committee's markup marathon, and whether Democrats and Republicans can find common ground; "Your Moment of Zen" (Rep. John Kennedy praises Qatar while comparing them to Hannibal Lecter).
4056	65	May 19	Jon Stewart	Patrick McGee	Apple in China: The Capture of the World’s Greatest Company
Jon critiques the reaction to Joe Biden's cancer diagnosis, in particular the current president's "best wishes" message to the former president, and CNN promoting anchor Jake Tapper's book about concerns over Biden's health in office; Patrick McGee discusses Apple's investments in China and the company's "sleepwalking" into the crises of cross-strait relations with Taiwan and the trade war with the U.S.
Special	Special	May 19	Jordan Klepper	n/a	n/a
The Daily Show Presents: Jordan Klepper Fingers The Pulse — MAGA: The Next Generation; Jordan goes from college campuses to Spring Break beaches to MMA arenas to examine why young voters were drawn to Donald Trump during the 2024 election.
4057	66	May 20	Ronny Chieng	Prabal Gurung	Walk Like a Girl
"The Worst Wing" finds the DHS secretary proposing a visa reality show and failing a habeas corpus pop quiz; FBI leaders Kash Patel & Dan Bongino do a 180 on their suspicions over Jeffrey Epstein's death; a Jesus Christ painting's relocation from the Merchant Marine Academy's basement gets a big thumbs down from the King of Kings Himself (played by Jordan Klepper); "Sports War" (Ronny and Michael Kosta on Knicks fans' celebrations, Bill Belichick's engagement, and a Dodger pitcher's toilet request); Prabal Gurung discusses getting motherly support as a designer, and how fashion has become more inclusive since the 1990s; Prabal also telestrates some of his ensembles (and those of two MAGA figures); "Your Moment of Zen" (a kid asks the White House press secretary "how many people has he fired?").
4058	67	May 21	Ronny Chieng	Simon Pegg	Mission: Impossible – The Final Reckoning
"Headlines" covers Donald Trump's testy Oval Office meeting with South African president Cyril Ramaphosa and a $600 "RUMP"-branded watch; Grace Kuhlenschmidt tests Trump's Golden Dome missile defense plan by roasting world leaders; "In My Opinion" (Charlamagne Tha God reminds the GOP that Trump is not the father figure they think he is); Simon Pegg on his early standup days, the moviegoing experience, and Tom Cruise's comedic timing in stunt work; "Your Moment of Zen" (Ramaphosa tells Trump "I don't have a plane to give you").
4059	68	May 22	Ronny Chieng	Dawn Staley	South Carolina Gamecocks women's basketball Uncommon Favor: Basketball, North Philly, My Mother, and the Life Lessons I Learned from All Three
Ronny analyzes the draining of Medicaid, the waiver of gun silencer fees, and other items in Donald Trump's "Big Beautiful Bill" that passed the House; H.R. 1 itself (played by Troy Iwata) is hurt over Democrats calling it ugly; TDS alum Al Madrigal is "living large" in South Sudan after taking the Trump Administration's stipend offer to self-deporting undocumented migrants; USC Gamecocks coach Dawn Staley on valuing individuals over analytics and coaching a title-winning team despite a heart condition, and offers reassurance to the Knicks after their Game 1 playoff loss.

== June ==
No. overall	No. in season	Date	Hosted by	Guest(s)	Promotion
4060	69	June 2	Jon Stewart	Carole Cadwalladr	How to Survive the Broligarchy on Substack; The Citizens
Jon analyzes Elon Musk's departure from DOGE ("He's leaving his job to make more family with his time"), reports of Musk's on-the-job drug use, and the contrast between DOGE's budget cutting and Donald Trump's big-spending plan; Jon also examines Dan Bongino's change in temperament since becoming FBI deputy director, and Trump sharing false claims about Joe Biden being replaced by clones ("How much ketamine are you on?"); Carole Cadwalladr on the "techno-authoritarian surveillance state" that has arisen since the Facebook–Cambridge Analytica scandal.
4061	70	June 3	Michael Kosta	Candace Parker	The Can-Do Mindset
"The Worst Wing" finds Elon Musk panning Donald Trump's "Big Beautiful Bill," the heads of FEMA and the SSA learning about hurricane season and Social Security, and the Secretary of Education defending Massapequa High School's "Chief" mascot; DNI Tulsi Gabbard turning Trump's Daily Brief into a Fox News-style production inspires a briefing styled in another format that could arouse his attention; an ad for "White Flight," which utilizes white stand-ins for passengers worried over DEI hires flying their plane; Candace Parker recalls lessons family and her college coach imparted on her, and discusses the WNBA's growth, basketball's physical toll, and remaining competitive off the court.
4062	71	June 4	Michael Kosta	Leah Litman	University of Michigan Law School; Strict Scrutiny podcast Lawless: How the Supreme Court Runs on Conservative Grievance, Fringe Theories, and Bad Vibes
Michael examines Democrats joining Elon Musk in blasting "The Big Beautiful Bill," what's behind Musk's criticisms of it, and how not every House Republican read all of it before approving it; the bill (played by Troy Iwata) returns to clap back at the new haters; "News to Meet You" (Jordan Klepper on how Tim Pool and his Russian-backed alt-right views entered the White House press briefing room); Leah Litman discusses the conservative influences guiding the Supreme Court; "Your Moment of Zen" (a supercut of reports on the end of the Musk/Trump "bromance").
4063	72	June 5	Michael Kosta	Jonathan D. Cohen	Losing Big: America’s Bet on Sports Gambling
Coverage of how "The Big Beautiful Bill" turned the Trump/Musk bromance into "World War Douche"; Grace Kuhlenschmidt thinks the president and the billionaire are merely playing 4-D chess (if not "7-D chess") to pass a more beautiful bill; "Back in Black" (Lewis Black on the use of AI by college students and educators); Jonathan D. Cohen on the "public health crisis" that is legalized sports betting.
4064	73	June 9	Jon Stewart	Stephen A. Smith	The Stephen A. Smith Show; First Take; Straight Shooter
Jon weighs in on the Los Angeles protests, which Jordan Klepper notes stems from Stephen Miller's demand that ICE take out the "notorious" gang "Casa del Depot"; Jon also notes how the MAGA-verse is less concerned about L.A. than they are about the catfight between "man-babies" Donald Trump & Elon Musk; Stephen A. Smith kvetches with Jon about the Knicks, and talks about why messengers matter in politics, and how he'd rather criticize government leaders than join them.
4065	74	June 10	Desi Lydic	Bryan Cranston	Everything's Going to Be Great
"Headlines" covers the mostly peaceful anti-ICE protests in Los Angeles and Donald Trump defying California's governor and the "Pussy Commontatas Act" to counter them (Desi: "Nothing calms down a situation like a military invasion"); a soldier pens a Ken Burns-style letter home about his experiences in "the not-at-all-war-torn Whole Foods parking lot on Fairfax and 3rd"; Josh Johnson and Grace Kuhlenschmidt ask New Yorkers to pick between Team Musk or Team Trump; Bryan Cranston on his passion for live theater and navigating between vastly different characters (Walter White in particular).
4066	75	June 11	Desi Lydic	Atsuko Okatsuka	Father
"Headlines" covers Donald Trump whipping Fort Bragg soldiers into a MAGA frenzy (or at least those showing a slim waist and loyalty to him), as well as high-priced plans for Trump's military parade (which Ronny Chieng is pumped about); Desi and "senior gay business correspondent" Troy Iwata on the muted corporate response to Pride Month 2025; Atsuko Okatsuka discusses her colorful clothes and personal stories in Father, and ponders alternate hairstyles if she were to change her signature bowl cut; "Your Moment of Zen" (Trump claims "I could have been a flutist").
4067	76	June 12	Desi Lydic	Jeff Hiller	Actress of a Certain Age
"The Worst Wing" (a vaccination committee becomes anti-vax, Pete Hegseth becomes anti-cat science, Tulsi Gabbard is pro-AI, and Elon Musk is apologetic to Donald Trump); Jordan Klepper and Michael Kosta debate whether Trump is a Valjean or a Javert, while Josh Johnson thinks Les Mis is "the one with the cats"; former TDS host Craig Kilborn narrates Stephen A. Smith's rise to becoming "The Greatest of All Takehavers" in "The Daily Showography" (after which Smith himself rebuts); Jeff Hiller discusses nods to other celebrity memoirs in his own, and encouraging queer youth during Pride Month.
4068	77	June 16	Jon Stewart	John Mulaney	Everybody's Live with John Mulaney; Mister Whatever tour
In a 28-minute monologue (one in which he takes an "intermission" for lunch), Jon touches on "Lil' Kim Jong Trump and his big military parade/quinceañera" and the competing No Kings protests, but then dives into Israel's long-running urgent need to thwart Iran's nuclear capabilities, and furiously calls out Republicans (Utah Sen. Mike Lee in particular) for their passive response and finger pointing over the shootings of two Minnesota legislators; John Mulaney discusses fighting (and losing to) three 14-year-olds on Everybody's Live, and guesses prior TDS guests based on questions Jon had for them.
4069	78	June 17	Jordan Klepper	Former U.S. President Bill Clinton; James Patterson	The First Gentleman
"Headlines" coverage of Donald Trump ditching the G7 Summit to possibly bring America into the Twelve-Day War, resulting in an intra-MAGA beef; Michael Kosta recommends ordering pizza and preparing for the worst (just as they are at The Pentagon); Jordan "Fingers the Pulse" of the U.S. Army 250th Anniversary Parade; former President Bill Clinton offers his take on Trump's second-term policies, and with James Patterson discusses their collaborative dynamic and their shared view that it's better to humanize than demonize (in both fiction and politics).
4070	79	June 18	Jordan Klepper	Matt Berninger	Get Sunk
"Headlines" covers Donald Trump's White House flag pole erection and the Cruz/Carlson war of words over a war with Iran; "Sports War" (Jordan and Desi Lydic on Caitlin Clark's return from injury, DeMarcus Cousins' testicular outburst, and Aaron Rodgers putting a ring on it); Matt Berninger performs "Inland Ocean" after discussing finding his authentic Midwestern self on Get Sunk, connecting to Taylor Swift's songwriting, and literally penning tunes on baseballs.

== July ==
No. overall	No. in season	Date	Hosted by	Guest(s)	Promotion
4071	80	July 7	Jon Stewart	Steve Kroft	n/a
Jon has harsh words about Congressional Republicans who passed Donald Trump's "Big Beautiful Bill", Democratic leaders who stood back, and the newly-signed measure's boosts for billionares and border security at the expense of Medicaid and SNAP; former 60 Minutes correspondent Steve Kroft discusses the "shakedown" that was Trump's now-settled lawsuit over the show's interview with Kamala Harris, and how it impacts Paramount Global's business future, CBS News, American journalism, and the First Amendment. (Note: Paramount Global is the parent company of both CBS and Comedy Central.)
4072	81	July 8	Ronny Chieng	Michael Luo	The New Yorker; Strangers In the Land: Exclusion, Belonging, and the Epic Story of the Chinese in America
"Headlines" covers the end of shoe removals at airport screenings (prompting Ronny to lead a "TSA! TSA!" chant), Benjamin Netanyahu kissing up to Donald Trump with a Nobel Peace Prize nomination, and the DOJ saying "cased closed" on the Jeffrey Epstein files; Michael Kosta insists that Epstein "actually never even existed"; "Trade Wars" examines Trump's latest tariff delay; Michael Luo on the history of bigotry against, and the persistence of, the Asian American community.
4073	82	July 9	Ronny Chieng	Lauren Greenfield	Social Studies
"Headlines" explores the world of AI, including Grok going rogue, Marco Rubio getting mimicked, and a band admitting they're fake; Grace Kuhlenschmidt defends mediocre AI-generated music; "Ko$ta Doin' Business" (Michael Kosta on financial impacts from the Big Beautiful Bill); Lauren Greenfield discusses documenting the effects of social media on teens; "Your Moment of Zen" (Outnumbered breaks away from Donald Trump's live remarks to talk about pearl earrings).
4074	83	July 10	Ronny Chieng	Youngmi Mayer	I’m Laughing Because I’m Crying
Iran disses the president's sunbathed navel in "Donald Trump Engages in Respectful International Diplomacy," which also covers Trump sticking up for "Brazilian Trump" with tariff threats and not realizing American aid to Ukraine was paused; Josh Johnson on Trump's awkward encounters with Liberia's leader and a female African journalist ("a Bob Hearts Abishola reboot"); Troy Iwata talks with a performance artist whose job as a "professional human carpet" is one that AI can't do; Youngmi Mayer on growing up with American propaganda in Korea and using humor to process a difficult childhood.
4075	84	July 14	Jon Stewart	Kyla Scanlon	In This Economy? How Money & Markets Really Work
"Elmo" admits it was he who posted antisemitic tweets on his (hacked, in reality) X account; Jon on MAGA World's anger over the Trump administration shelving the Epstein files, Donald Trump reigniting his feud with Rosie O'Donnell as a distraction, and Trump's disaster relief double standard; Kyla Scanlon discusses the importance of teaching Americans about the economy, the government's devaluing of healthcare & Medicaid, and why labor and capital doesn't have to be mutually exclusive; "Your Moment of Zen" (Trump hogs the spotlight at the Club World Cup final).
4076	85	July 15	Jordan Klepper	Thomas Chatterton Williams	The Atlantic; Summer of Our Discontent: The Age of Certainty and the Demise of Discourse
Jordan examines "Week Two of the MAGA Civil War over the Epstein files" and Donald Trump's excuse that the shelved files were a Democratic concoction; Jordan then reviews the "Occam's giant f**king machete" that is the Trump/Epstein/Maxwell friendship, which Michael Kosta counters was just a convenient avenue for Trump to investigate Epstein; "In My Opinion" (Nick Offerman stands up for the underfunded National Park Service); Thomas Chatterton Williams on how the fetishization of race and identity led America from Obama-era optimism to Trump-era division, and what can be learned from France's universal approach to identity.
4077	86	July 16	Jordan Klepper	Jennifer Kaytin Robinson	I Know What You Did Last Summer
"Headlines" (Donald Trump goes on and on about his uncle and voices frustration with MAGA's Epstein files obsession; "senior pedophile correspondent" Grace Kuhlenschmidt offers new Trump/Epstein evidence (which Jordan quickly deduces is fake); Michael Kosta gauges New Yorkers' interest in Elon Musk's planned political party; Jennifer Kaytin Robinson on brainstorming character deaths, masking disturbing props, and how '90s movies inspired a love of filmmaking.
4078	87	July 17	Jordan Klepper	Reggie Watts	Reggie Watts Summer Tour
"Donald J. Trump, Commander in Beef" covers the president's animosity towards Federal Reserve chair Jerome Powell (a man Trump appointed to the role) for Powell's refusal to lower interest rates; Desi Lydic can't give bond market advice over construction noise at the Fed's headquarters; Josh Johnson on New York City taxi drivers being unable to "stop" when needing to "go"; Reggie Watts has advice for billionaires and discusses improv comedy and being "AI positive."
4079	88	July 21	Jon Stewart	Dr. Patrick Soon-Shiong	ImmunityBio; Los Angeles Times
Analysis of Donald Trump's alleged crude birthday card to Jeffrey Epstein, and attempts by Trump and his administration to distract from the story; in defiant fashion (“I’m not giving in, I’m not going anywhere… I think?”), Jon torches CBS for its cancellation of The Late Show with Stephen Colbert, and with the backing of the “Go F-ck Yourself Choir” blasts institutions willingly acquiescing to Trump; (Note: Stephen Colbert is a Daily Show alum and hosted Comedy Central's The Colbert Report before moving to CBS and The Late Show in 2015.) Dr. Patrick Soon-Shiong reveals public-ownership plans for the L.A. Times, and discusses his work on cancer treatments and how newspapers inspired him as a kid in apartheid-era South Africa.
4080	89	July 22	Josh Johnson	Rob Franklin	Great Black Hope
"Headlines" covers the latest in the Epstein files controversy and Donald Trump's latest distraction efforts, including the release of files pertaining to the assassination of Martin Luther King Jr.; Grace Kuhlenschmidt reveals materiel in which MLK praises Trump (which Josh quickly deduces is fake); "In My Opinion" (Charlamagne Tha God on Trump showing signs of dementia); Rob Franklin discusses exploring race, class, and respectability politics, and not knowing your actual height.
4081	90	July 23	Josh Johnson	Samara Cyn	backroads
"Headlines" starts with Donald Trump promising to reduce drug prices by as much as 1000%, but turns to the revelation of Trump's name in the Epstein client list; Michael Kosta on how the White House really wants people talking about (unverified claims of) election cheating by Barack Obama instead of "Jeffrey Epilepsy or whatever"; Samara Cyn on the differences between her poetry and her music, and applying a lighthearted approach to the latter on backroads (from which she performs "hardheaded").
4082	91	July 24	Josh Johnson	Christopher McDonald	Happy Gilmore 2
"The Very Normal and Not Shady Handling of the Epstein Files" (video of Jeffrey Epstein being questioned about Donald Trump, GOP lawmakers confront the issue while the AG avoids it, and The QAnon Shaman calls Trump a fraud); an ad for "Ozempstein," a "revolutionary new drug from the Trump administration" that suppresses the urge to know more about Epstein; "News to Meet You" (Jordan Klepper on Scott Jennings' metamorphosis "from principled caterpillar to craven butterfly"); Christopher McDonald on reprising (and being recognized as) Shooter McGavin and his dream storyline for Hacks.
4083	92	July 28	Jon Stewart	Peter Beinart	Being Jewish After the Destruction of Gaza: A Reckoning; Jewish Currents; The Beinart Notebook on Substack
Jon highlights how a caddie's favorable (and illegal) golf ball drop for Donald Trump is an appropriate metaphor for conservatives giving him cover on the Epstein files, a controversy Trump himself can't seem to shut up about; Trump's claim that famous Black figures were paid to endorse Kamala Harris in 2024 gets a big disapproval from "Emmy nominee [and TDS alum] Jessica Williams"; Peter Beinart on Israel being "victims and victimizers" in the Gaza war & famine, and learning from Jewish history to be saviors instead of oppressors.
4084	93	July 29	Desi Lydic	Jenny Slate	Dying for Sex
"Trump Meets World" (Desi's unsure if Donald Trump opening his newest golf course is his side hustle or his main job as president); how the U.S./E.U. trade deal will raise prices on imports; Michael Kosta & Grace Kuhlenschmidt promote religion on the job (now that federal workers can do the same); "Everything Is Stupid" (Ronny Chieng on a 9-1-1 dispatcher giving an incessant caller "the booby prize"); Jenny Slate on making a story about cancer & female friendship, how it changed her views on death & caregiving, and what's on her "bucket list."
4085	94	July 30	Desi Lydic	Alison Brie; Dave Franco	Together
Sight-setting on "The Worst Wing": Kristi Noem's on horseback riding, Lee Zeldin's on EPA regulations, Marco Rubio's on birth control, and Pete Hegseth's on the Tennessee governor's mansion; Desi and Jordan Klepper on Hegseth employing polygraph tests to root out Pentagon leakers; "The Daily Showography" tracks Joe Rogan's journey to "Roganlightenment"; sharing one desk chair, Alison Brie & Dave Franco discuss sticking together (literally) on Together, and audience reactions to the film's horror/rom-com fusion.
4086	95	July 31	Desi Lydic	Tony Hale	Sketch
Desi examines the controversy over Sydney Sweeney's "great jeans" (or genes?) ad campaign for American Eagle Outfitters; "Jordan Klepper Fingers the Pulse" (a compendium of MAGA faithful giving "rational" thoughts on the Epstein files over the years); Tony Hale on how Sketch encourages conversations among young and old about expressing emotions.

== September ==
No. overall	No. in season	Date	Hosted by	Guest(s)	Promotion
4087	96	September 8	Jon Stewart	Spike Lee	Highest 2 Lowest
After acknowledging some of the news that happened during the show's five-week break, Jon examines how health concerns about, and sycophantic praise toward, Donald Trump equates the president with a Make-A-Wish kid… if not a child wishing his enemies into a cornfield; Spike Lee discusses working with Denzel Washington, what he learned from his parents growing up in Brooklyn, and if this will be the Knicks' year.
4088	97	September 9	Michael Kosta	Patrick McEnroe	Tennis on ESPN; International Tennis Hall of Fame; Holding Court with Patrick McEnroe on SiriusXM
"The Very Normal and Not Shady Handling of the Epstein Files" looks at the revelation, and conservatives' dismissal, of Donald Trump's suggestive birthday card to Jeffrey Epstein; an ad for the "Trump Greeting Card Collection" (Make America Greet Again"); "Sports War" (Michael and Ronny Chieng on tennis fans' etiquette, Jalen Carter's spit take, and an AI-managed baseball game); former tennis pros Michael and Patrick McEnroe discuss life lessons learned from the sport, the US Open's popularity, the Alcaraz-Sinner rivalry, and Amanda Anisimova's honesty about her mental health.
4089	98	September 10	Michael Kosta	Michael Grunwald	We Are Eating the Earth
"Headlines" covers Donald Trump dining (and facing protests) at a D.C. restaurant and his order to rename the Department of Defense the "Department of War" (which a street-talking Josh Johnson says is a sign that America is ready to go to war with itself); Jordan Klepper checks out efforts in Burlington, Vermont to attract disgruntled Canadian tourists; Michael Grunwald on solutions to alleviate agriculture's adverse effects on Earth's climate.
4090	99	September 11	Michael Kosta	Rainn Wilson	Code 3
Michael analyzes the inflammatory political rhetoric following the assassination of Charlie Kirk, and the need for America to put aside "they" for "we" after such tragedies (citing how the country did it 24 years earlier); Grace Kuhlenschmidt on efforts to tax livestock emissions; Rainn Wilson on how paramedics' experiences & pay issues inspired Code 3, the benefits of a spiritual revolution, and how he feels about Dwight Schrute.
4091	100	September 16	Desi Lydic	Jay Duplass; Michael Strassner	The Baltimorons
Desi unpacks the toxic internet discourse in the wake of Charlie Kirk's assassination and conservatives practicing cancel culture toward Kirk's posthumous critics; Michael Kosta thinks it best that America should return to "a time before the internet"; Grace Kuhlenschmidt asks New Yorkers if the National Guard can make it there (since Donald Trump's been sending them anywhere); Jay Duplass & Michael Strassner discuss their friendship and the cathartic experience making The Baltimorons.
4092	101	September 17	Desi Lydic	Cooper Hoffman	The Long Walk
"Headlines" (Kash Patel gets grilled over the Epstein files in Congress while Donald Trump gets the royal treatment in Great Britain); "Back in Black" (Lewis Black roasts the popularity of Labubu dolls); Cooper Hoffman discusses how Stephen King's 1979 novel feels relevant in 2025, and the importance of having people walking with you through life.
4093	102	September 18	Jon Stewart	Maria Ressa	Rappler; How to Stand Up to a Dictator
"It’s the all-new, government-approved Daily Show, with your patriotically-obedient host, Jon Stewart!"; In the wake of ABC (under FCC and affiliate pressure) suspending Jimmy Kimmel Live!, Jon and, in song, "The Best F#@king News Team" nervously lavish praise on "our dear leader" Donald Trump; Jon also redfines the First Amendment as a "Talent-O-Meter" on the president's desk, and stresses how people shouldn't demean or namecall their opponents (followed by footage of conservatives doing just that towards liberals); Maria Ressa compares the Trump administration to the presidency of Rodrigo Duerte in the Philippines (where she was jailed for criticizing Duerte), discusses authoritarian governments' influence on tech algorithms, and warns Americans to take peaceful action before their rights vanish.
4094	103	September 22	Jon Stewart	Former New Zealand Prime Minister Dame Jacinda Ardern	A Different Kind of Power; Prime Minister
Jon celebrates the pending return of Jimmy Kimmel Live!, but notes how that show's FCC-influenced suspension is a sign that Donald Trump isn't shy about using his presidency to silence his critics; Jacinda Ardern discusses the importance of politicians "doing the right thing," and the courageousness in being optimistic amidst global political polarization.
4095	104	September 23	Jordan Klepper	John Fugelsang	Tell Me Everything on SiriusXM; Separation of Church and Hate
Michael Kosta, Desi Lydic, and Josh Johnson try to analyze the Trump administration's claim that Tylenol's primary ingredient causes autism, only to get caught up in the rapture; Jordan dives into Trump's beef with an escalator (among other grudges) at the UN General Assembly; John Fugelsang on the history of non-violent Christian activism, and the need for progressives to counter the far right's co-opting of religion.
4096	105	September 24	Jordan Klepper	Sebastian Murphy Viagra Boys	Viagr Aboys
Jordan examines Donald Trump's about-face on Russia in its war with Ukraine, as well as the right's suspicion that the UN set Trump up with a malfunctioning escalator, a story Grace Kuhlenschmidt believes "goes all the way to the top… and then flattens out and goes back down to the bottom"; Viagra Boys perform "Pyramid of Health" after frontman Sebastian Murphy discusses the band's satirical brand of resistance music, and how Mariah Carey's "We Belong Together" brought them together.
4097	106	September 25	Jordan Klepper	Regina Hall	One Battle After Another
Jordan reviews Donald Trump's latest pettiness towards Joe Biden and James Comey; Troy Iwata on the "Legally Blonde" vibes surrounding Trump's appointment of Lindsey Halligan to US Attorney; "In My Opinion" (Leslie Jones on how racism will persist without better, factual education about Black history); Regina Hall on the themes of One Battle Another Another, her first meeting with the film's director, and working alongside a scene-stealing baby.
4098	107	September 29	Jon Stewart	Jill Lepore	We the People: A History of the U.S. Constitution; Harvard University
Jon calls out both sides of the political aisle for their "right-left framing" of mass shooting perpetrators; Jill Lepore on how the U.S. Constitution was designed to evolve and the perils created by original interpretations of the document.
4099	108	September 30	Ronny Chieng	Cristela Alonzo	Upper Classy
Ronny critiques "Secretary of War" [cue thrashing guitar riff] Pete Hegseth's gripes about "fat troops" and diversity to a room full of top military leaders; Donald Trump telling that same room about a "war from within" inspires a new recruitment ad promoting service in such "hostile lands" as Portland and Chicago; "In My Opinion" (Ricky Velez on the problems caused by online sports betting); Cristela Alonzo meets Ronny's mother after discussing honoring her own mom and lower-class Americans through her standup comedy.

== October ==
No. overall	No. in season	Date	Hosted by	Guest	Promotion
4100	109	October 1	Ronny Chieng	Benny Safdie	The Smashing Machine
Donald Trump posts offensive AI videos of Congressional Democrats as "Shutdown Showdown 2025" kicks in; Josh Johnson on the shutdown impacting the National Park system; "Ko$ta Doin' Business" (Michael Kosta on "job hugging," adults ordering from kids' menus, the short-changing tooth fairy, and exploding prosecco bottles); Benny Safdie on The Smashing Machine's cinematography tricks, and collaborating with the film's star (Dwayne Johnson) and subject (MMA legend Mark Kerr); "Your Moment of Zen" (an in memoriam to Jane Goodall includes her comment on dogs being her favorite animal).
4101	110	October 2	Ronny Chieng	Kevin Nguyen	Mỹ Documents: A Novel
Ronny analyses dueling memes in "Shutdown Showdown 2025" as well as the Trump Administration's desire to end funding for blue-state projects (something Michael Kosta says White House budget director Russell Vought is really excited about); "The People Behind the People" shows how "Thaddeus Mandible Crowley" finds arcane laws to justify Donald Trump's insane ideas; Kevin Nguyen discusses the timeliness and nuanced ideas of Mỹ Documents and the importance of learning your family's history.
4102	111	October 6	Jon Stewart	Tristan Harris	Center for Humane Technology
Jon examines Donald Trump's use of "Shutdown Showdown 2025" to cut federal programs and steamroll the Constitution, while praising Democrats for "defend[ing] the rights of people to go into a little less medical debt"; Tristan Harris discusses AI's disruption of the workforce and human growth, and how companies value being first to market at the expense of product safety.
4103	112	October 7	Josh Johnson	Wawa Gatheru	Black Girl Environmentalist
"Headlines" covers Donald Trump and AG Pam Bondi respectively dodging questions about Ghislaine Maxwell and Jeffrey Epstein; Troy Iwata on what it really takes to earn a spot in Heaven (something Trump has obsessed about); Michael Kosta hunts for Burmese pythons in the Everglades with "Python huntress" Amy Siewe; Wawa Gatheru on fostering the next generation of environmental leaders.
4104	113	October 8	Josh Johnson	Anthony Ramos	A House of Dynamite
"Shutdown Showdown 2025" (the Trump Administration searches for files about Amelia Earhart while travelers are impacted by FAA staff shortages); Jordan Klepper decodes Donald Trump's "we'll take care of them" taunts to furloughed workers; Ronny Chieng on how Chuck E. Cheese makes adults act stupid in "Everything is Stupid"; Anthony Ramos gives Josh a lesson in harmonizing and discusses unwinding while filming the intense A House of Dynamite.
4105	114	October 9	Josh Johnson	Hunter Prosper	Stories from a Stranger
Josh gives Donald Trump props for brokering a Gaza war peace plan, but calls him out for painting antifa as a bogeyman to justify sending troops to Portland; "Tech Yeah!" (Grace Kuhlenschmidt on AI-powered data centers, videos, and actresses, as well as a "robot Olympics"); Hunter Prosper on his work as an ICU nurse and content creator, the importance of deeper discussions, and immortalizing his grandfather's experiences.
4106	115	October 20	Jon Stewart	U.S. Senator Bernie Sanders of Vermont	Fight Oligarchy
Jon analyzes how the latest No Kings rallies failed to meet Fox News' violent expectations ("seven million Americans, zero mass shootings"), and how the Declaration of Independence foreshadowed Donald Trump's monarchial antics; conservatives seeing Trump as Heaven-sent inspires a guess-the-quote game, "Jesus or Trump?"; Senator Bernie Sanders on harnessing No Kings energy, the dangers of corporations and oligarchs, and making AI work for working people.
4107	116	October 21	Michael Kosta	Catherine Bracy	TechEquity; World Eaters: How Venture Capital is Cannibalizing the Economy
"Headlines" (Donald Trump takes the wrecking ball to the White House East Wing, while problematic statements plague a Senate candidate and a special counsel nominee); Ronny Chieng recommends politicians not leave a paper trail of their racist remarks; the co-chair of Communist Party USA tells Desi Lydic of the inaccuracy in branding Democrats in general, and a New York mayoral candidate in particular, "communists"; Catherine Bracy discusses the evolution & modern-day dangers of venture capital and making sure technology benefits not just its wealthy owners.
4108	117	October 22	Michael Kosta	Ryan Holiday	Daily Stoic; Wisdom Takes Work
Furloughed federal workers resort to side jobs during "Shutdown Showdown 2025"; Michael analyzes Donald Trump seeking $230 million from the DOJ for investigations against him, while Troy Iwata (in the "White House Laboratorium for Grifting") thinks of other ways Trump can sue his own government; "Back in Black" (Lewis Black on protein being added to various foods); Ryan Holiday on the benefits of stoicism and the importance of wisdom.
4109	118	October 23	Michael Kosta	Jeff Tweedy	Twilight Override
Michael analyzes the illegal gambling scheme enveloping the NBA, as well as Donald Trump's continued defense of his White House State Ballroom project (which Josh Johnson joins "podcast alpha males" in applauding); "News to Meet You" (Jordan Klepper profiles Fox & Friends co-host Lawrence Jones); Jeff Tweedy on the themes of Twilight Override, his years as a Midwestern musician, and the need for people to connect without phones.
4110	119	October 27	Jon Stewart	New York State Assemblyman Zohran Mamdani	2025 New York City mayoral campaign
After examining how Donald Trump feels unappreciated for all he's done (e.g. tear down the White House East Wing, blow up Venezuelan boats without due process) but loves the pomp of foreign travel, Jon suggests he should run for a third term in 2028… but should only serve as "America’s touring company"; Zohran Mamdani discusses the kindness of New York City voters, his priorities should he enter Gracie Mansion, and what he sees as the end of "endorsements deciding elections."
4111	120	October 28	Desi Lydic	Lucy Dacus	Forever Is a Feeling: The Archives
"Trump Meets World" finds "old American beaverhound" Donald parading around Japan and griping about magnets to a Navy assembly; Troy Iwata is "really not looking forward to our president becoming a 'Japan guy'"; Lucy Dacus discusses the influences on her creativity, why she became an ordained wedding officiant, and the inspiration behind the song "Modigliani" (which she also performs).
4112	121	October 29	Desi Lydic	Dan Murphy; Aubrey Plaza	Luna and the Witch Throw a Halloween Party; Let's Love!
South Korea crowns Donald Trump in "Trump Meets World" while his constituents face the loss of SNAP benefits due to "Shutdown Showdown 2025"; Michael Kosta says rich sugar daddies are ready to help fund the government… so long as they get privileges in return; "In My Opinion" (Charlamagne Tha God on how Democrats can, and must, capture No Kings energy); Aubrey Plaza discusses returning to live theater in Let's Love!, and with Dan Murphy talks about their friendship and collaboration on Luna and the Witch (a book inspired by her grandmother); "Your Moment of Zen" (Trump's fake-accent impression of India's prime minister).
4113	122	October 30	Desi Lydic	Justine Lupe	Nobody Wants This
"Trump Meets World" (Donald Trump gets only a handshake from China's president); Desi's haunted (literally) by her agreeing with Marjorie Taylor Greene's criticisms of fellow GOP lawmakers; "Everything is Stupid" (Ronny Chieng on the housekeeping robot "Neo"); Justine Lupe on her Nobody Wants This character's dynamics, being adored by on- and off-screen partners, and writing a "love letter" to her girlfriends; "Your Moment of Zen" (an assortment of local news figures dressing up for Halloween).

== November ==
No. overall	No. in season	Date	Hosted by	Guest	Promotion
4114	123	November 3	Jon Stewart	Former U.S. Senator Joe Manchin	Dead Center: In Defense of Common Sense
After acknowledging The Daily Show's renewal for 2026 and America "defeating our worst enemy, Canada," Jon calls out the "let-them-eat-cake optics" of Donald Trump's Mar-a-Lago party while SNAP benefits expire and "Shutdown Showdown 2025" rages on; Joe Manchin discusses whether centrism exists in the Trump era, and how he thinks the country can move forward; "Your Moment of Zen" (Senator John Kennedy titles the shutdown soap opera "As the Stomach Turns").
4115	124	November 4	Jordan Klepper	Former Finnish Prime Minister Sanna Marin	Hope in Action: A Memoir About the Courage to Lead
"InDecision 2025" reviews home-stretch campaigning in New York City's mayoral race, in particular Andrew Cuomo showing off his "good luck" white Ford Bronco that's not OJ Simpson's; Ronny Chieng says Cuomo also has a "lucky sweater" that's not Bill Cosby's; in Times Square, Grace Kuhlenschmidt conducts an exit poll of non-New Yorkers; Sanna Marin on facing double standards as a government leader, the benefits of multi-party parliaments and Nordic welfare states, and why the young and diverse should participate in democracy.
4116	125	November 5	Jordan Klepper	Scott Galloway	Notes on Being a Man; Pivot and The Prof G Pod podcasts New York University Stern School of Business
"InDecision 2025" recaps Democrats' Election Night victories, including Zohran Mamdani's in New York City; a look at outgoing New York mayor Eric Adams' history of being "A Man of Too Many Words"; Desi Lydic examines how Donald Trump came to hate the same Big Apple he once proudly called home in "The Art of the Altercation"; Scott Galloway on the need for better, empathetic male role models; "Your Moment of Zen" (Newsmax's Greg Kelly mopes over the election results).
4117	126	November 6	Jordan Klepper	Ethan Hawke	Blue Moon; The Lowdown
"Headlines" (Donald Trump threatens Nigeria, while his weight loss drug price plan has bad math); flight reductions due to "Shutdown Showdown 2025" inspires a tourism ad promoting airport-free "Muddy Gap, Nebraska"; "Sports War" (Jordan and Ronny Chieng on the Dodgers' World Series win, the NBA gambling scandal, and a dart player's phallic nickname); Ethan Hawke on transforming into Lorenz Hart for Blue Moon and the Tulsa artistry in The Lowdown; "Your Moment of Zen" (Trump insists he's not a mean person).
4118	127	November 10	Jon Stewart	U.S. Representative Chris Deluzio of Pennsylvania; U.S. Representative Pat Ryan of New York	United States House Committee on Armed Services; Democratic Veterans Caucus
Equating them to the New York Giants' own "world-class collapse," Jon excoriates Senate Democrats for approving a plan to reopen government without firm guarantees to extend the Affordable Care Act subsidies they had long been demanding; Congressmen and Democratic Veterans Caucus co-chairs Chris Deluzio & Pat Ryan discuss how the Trump administration prioritizes military spending over the livelihood of current & former service members, and how Americans of all partisan stripes desire representatives who'll fight for them.
4119	128	November 11	Josh Johnson	Rob Riggle	Grit, Spit, and Never Quit: A Marine's Guide to Comedy and Life
Josh asks "did Donald Trump just stupid himself into socialism?" with his ideas for 50-year mortgages and $2000 stimulus checks (money Grace Kuhlenschmidt wants so bad); Troy Iwata & Desi Lydic review the Fox Nation Patriot Awards in "Who Won It Best"; before going to thumb war with Josh, TDS alum and former Marine Rob Riggle discusses applying a military mindset to comedy and advising veterans struggling with civilian life.
4120	129	November 12	Josh Johnson	Jay Jurden	Yes, Ma'am
Josh dives into e-mails that might implicate Donald Trump's connection to Jeffrey Epstein's sex ring, while Ronny Chieng says Ghislaine Maxwell's swank prison accommodations are normal; "In My Opinion" (Nick Offerman laments the rise of profit-minded agriculture and the loss of small farms) Jay Jurden on being a "Southern gentleman" in New York and how studying dramatic arts (at two football-crazy SEC schools) helps him stay present on-stage.
4121	130	November 13	Josh Johnson	Miguel	CAOS
"The Very Normal and Not Shady Handling of the Epstein Files" (GOP lawmakers release their own unflattering documents about Donald Trump, while conservative pundits downplay the bombshells); Troy Iwata gripes about the bad grammar in Epstein's messages; "Ronny Chieng's Eye on AI" (how AI is dumbing down college students' minds); Miguel records a sexy voicemail greeting for Josh after discussing his artist-in-residence course at NYU and the personal reflections & cultural heritage that inform CAOS; "Your Moment of Zen" (newscast puns about the penny coin's production halt).
4122	131	November 17	Jon Stewart	Christiane Amanpour	CNN; Amanpour; The Ex Files with Jamie Rubin podcast
Jon criticizes Donald Trump's pivots, and invokes Pizzagate in blasting the alt-right's hypocrisy, over "The Very Normal and Not Shady Handling of the Epstein Files"; Christiane Amanpour on the "drip, drip, drip nature" of the Epstein controversy, and investigative journalism's importance in holding the invincible accountable.
4123	132	November 18	Ronny Chieng	Hikari	Rental Family
The House claps back at Donald Trump over "The Very Normal and Not Shady Handling of the Epstein Files," while the president just wants to overlook the visiting Saudi crown prince's connection to murder; Josh Johnson defends Trump's desire to not talk about the files; "In My Opinion" (Leslie Jones on how air travelers are treated better than air traffic controllers); Hikari on dramatizing the use of rental family services in her native Japan, and moving to the U.S. to pursue her filmmaking dreams.
4124	133	November 19	Ronny Chieng	Sean Sherman	Owamni; Turtle Island: Foods and Traditions of the Indigenous Peoples of North America
Donald Trump gets hands-on with Mohammed bin Salman while waiving the Epstein Files Transparency Act through; Jordan Klepper warns we may not like who or what may be in said files; "Tech Yeah!" (Grace Kuhlenschmidt on a Russian robot's faceplant, AI-preserved dead grannies, and an AI-generated country singer); Chef Sean Sherman on showcasing healthy indigenous cuisine & culture at his restaurant and in his book; "Your Moment of Zen" (Trump mocks the phrase "climate change").
4125	134	November 20	Ronny Chieng	Sebastian Maniscalco	It Ain't Right
"The Worst Wing" (Pam Bondi looks for Democrats' connections into Jeffrey Epstein, a US attorney screws up the James Comey case, Grok strokes Elon Musk's ego, and Melania Trump talks to Marines about AI in warfare); a retro-styled Michael Kosta echoes Transportation Secretary Sean Duffy's campaign to bring civility back to air travel; a promo for "RFK Hospital," a medical drama set at "the only hospital brave enough to follow the medical advice of America's health secretary"; Sebastian Maniscalco on playing in arenas, closing his Hulu special with his family, and the evolution of standup comedy marketing.

== December ==
No. overall	No. in season	Date	Hosted by	Guest	Promotion
4126	135	December 1	Jon Stewart	Elizabeth Kolbert	The New Yorker; Life on a Little-Known Planet: Dispatches from a Changing World
Jon unpacks Donald Trump's Thanksgiving weekend of abusing reporters, denigrating Minnesota's governor, bragging about his "perfect" MRI score… and renewing his anti-immigrant agenda after one Afghan national allegedly shot National Guard troops in Washington; Jon also slams Trump's habit of claiming January 6 insurrectionists do no wrong and immigrants from "so-called less desirable countries" do no right; Elizabeth Kolbert on humans' 10,000-year history of disrupting Earth's climate, and how countries can reap financial & environmental gains by fostering clean energy.
4127	136	December 2	Desi Lydic	Nikki DeLoach	A Grand Ole Opry Christmas
"The Worst Wing" (Melania Trump trims what's left of the White House, Kash Patel demands an FBI jacket, and "Secretary of Defensiveness" Pete Hegseth pins possible war crimes on his admiral); Jordan Klepper says there's a "Scapegoat Army" in Hegseth's DoD; Michael Kosta offers alternatives to tariff-saddled holiday items in "Ko$ta Doin' Business: A Very Merry Biz-mas Cash-tacular"; Nikki DeLoach recalls bonding with Desi on Awkward, and discusses the healing power of Hallmark Channel movies and, for GivingTuesday, the organizations closest to her heart.
4128	137	December 3	Josh Johnson	Asi Wind	More Than Magic Tour
Josh and Troy Iwata question Donald Trump's seesawing in his war on narcoterrorism (from threatening suspected Venezuelan traffickers to pardoning Honduras' drug-smuggling former president); Ronny Chieng and Peter Wilford of the Institute for AI Policy & Strategy discuss AI's economic promises and perils; Asi Wind performs some tricks for Josh and discusses his passion for magic and collaborating with his audiences.
4129	138	December 4	Jordan Klepper	Ken Casey	Dropkick Murphys; For the People
Jordan critiques images of Jeffrey Epstein's island in "The Very Normal and Not Shady Handling of the Epstein Files"; "Headlines" (Pete Hegseth's Signalgate role, MAGA's DoD press corps takeover, and Donald Trump's name on the US Institute of Peace); an ad for "Trump Tinsel," holiday garland made from shredded Epstein files; Ken Casey discusses how punk music's history of political activism inspired Dropkick Murphys' music, and encouraging other musicians to speak out as well; "Your Moment of Zen" (The Five's Katrina Campins & Jesse Watters claim "All Republican women are hot").
4130	139	December 8	Jon Stewart	Malala Yousafzai	Finding My Way
Jon discusses Donald Trump winning "the FIFA Appease Prize," and shows the "eerie" parallels between the current drumbeat of American conflict with Venezuela and the run-up to the Iraq War; TDS alum Rob Corddry travels from the past to warn "we cannot make that mistake ever again in the future"; Malala Yousafzai discusses how her life has changed since her 2013 visit to TDS, as well as managing her mental health, pursuing activist work, and establishing a school for women in Pakistan.
Special	Special	December 8	Jordan Klepper	n/a	n/a
The Daily Show Presents: Jordan Klepper Fingers the Pulse — Give the Man a Prize; Jordan crisscrosses the U.S. and travels to Norway to ask if Donald Trump deserves winning something he openly covets — the Nobel Peace Prize.
4131	140	December 9	Ronny Chieng	Cory Doctorow	Enshittification: Why Everything Suddenly Got Worse and What to Do About It
"Headlines" (free-entry days at National Parks get "a little extra nationalist," Donald Trump saves farmers from himself, and the First Lady attempts to spread yuletide cheer); a pull-up battle by the Secretaries of Health and Transportation leads to an ad promoting pull-up bars as the newest airport convenience; "Who Won It Best!" (Troy Iwata and Desi Lydic recap Trump's appearances at the Kennedy Center Honors and "The FIFA World Cup Draw & Peace Prize Ceremony"); Cory Doctorow on making tech platforms benefit their users more than their billionaire owners.
4132	141	December 10	Desi Lydic	Annie Leibovitz	Women
Desi analyzes how Donald Trump focused on topics other than the economy at a rally about the economy, and points out a Fox News captionist quickly changing their slip of the keyboard in Trump's speech line from "I love minors" to "I love miners"; Michael Kosta chalks up Trump's recent berating of female reporters to "man-o-pause"; "Back in Black" (Lewis Black on "the hottest TikTok trends of 2025"); Annie Leibovitz discusses photographing women in boundary-breaking images.
4133	142	December 11	Michael Kosta	Lonnie Thompson	The Ohio State University; Canary
Donald Trump and DHS brag about seizing an oil tanker off the Venezuelan coast; Ronny Chieng introduces new MAGA-friendly fonts (after the State Department banned use of the "woke" Calibri); a trailer for "Oh, Trolly Night!" a holiday rom-com where online political enemies become unlikely lovers IRL; Lonnie Thompson on studying climate history through ice and the importance of following your dreams.
