= Circus of Books (film) =

2019 documentary film

- Official poster
- Directed by: Rachel Mason
- Written by: Rachel Mason; Kathryn Robson
- Starring: Karen Mason; Barry Mason; Rachel Mason
- Distributed by: Netflix
- Release dates: April 26, 2019 (Tribeca); April 22, 2020 (United States)
- Running time: 92 minutes
- Country: United States
- Language: English

Circus of Books is a 2019 American documentary film directed by Rachel Mason, written by Rachel Mason and Kathryn Robson and starring Karen Mason, Barry Mason and Rachel Mason. The premise revolves around Circus of Books, a bookstore and gay pornography shop in West Hollywood, California, and in the Silver Lake neighborhood of Los Angeles.

The film premiered at the 2019 Tribeca Film Festival, and was released on Netflix in the United States on April 22, 2020.

== Cast ==
- Karen Mason
- Barry Mason
- Rachel Mason
- Josh Mason
- Micah Mason
- Alexei Romanoff
- Billy Miller
- Don Norman
- Freddie Bercovitz
- Paulo Morillo
- Ellen Winer
- Larry Flynt
- David Gregory
- Fernando Aguilar
- Alaska Thunderfuck
- Jeff Stryker

== Release ==
The film premiered at the 2019 Tribeca Film Festival. It went on to show at several film festivals, including the Frameline Film Festival, Outfest, the Hamptons International Film Festival, and the BFI London Film Festival. At the 2019 Sidewalk Film Festival, the film won the Audience Award for Best Documentary Feature.

On April 22, 2020, the film was released on Netflix.

== Reception ==
As of October 2021, Circus of Books holds a 98% approval rating on Rotten Tomatoes, based on 59 reviews with an average rating of 7.8/10. The website's critics consensus reads: "Like the cheekily named store at this documentary's center, Circus of Books proves there are countless stories below the surface if we're only willing to look." The Guardian's Peter Bradshaw rated the film 4 out of 5 stars.

Circus of Books was nominated for the 2021 GLAAD Media Award for Outstanding Documentary.
