= Circus of Books =

Book and pornography store in California, US

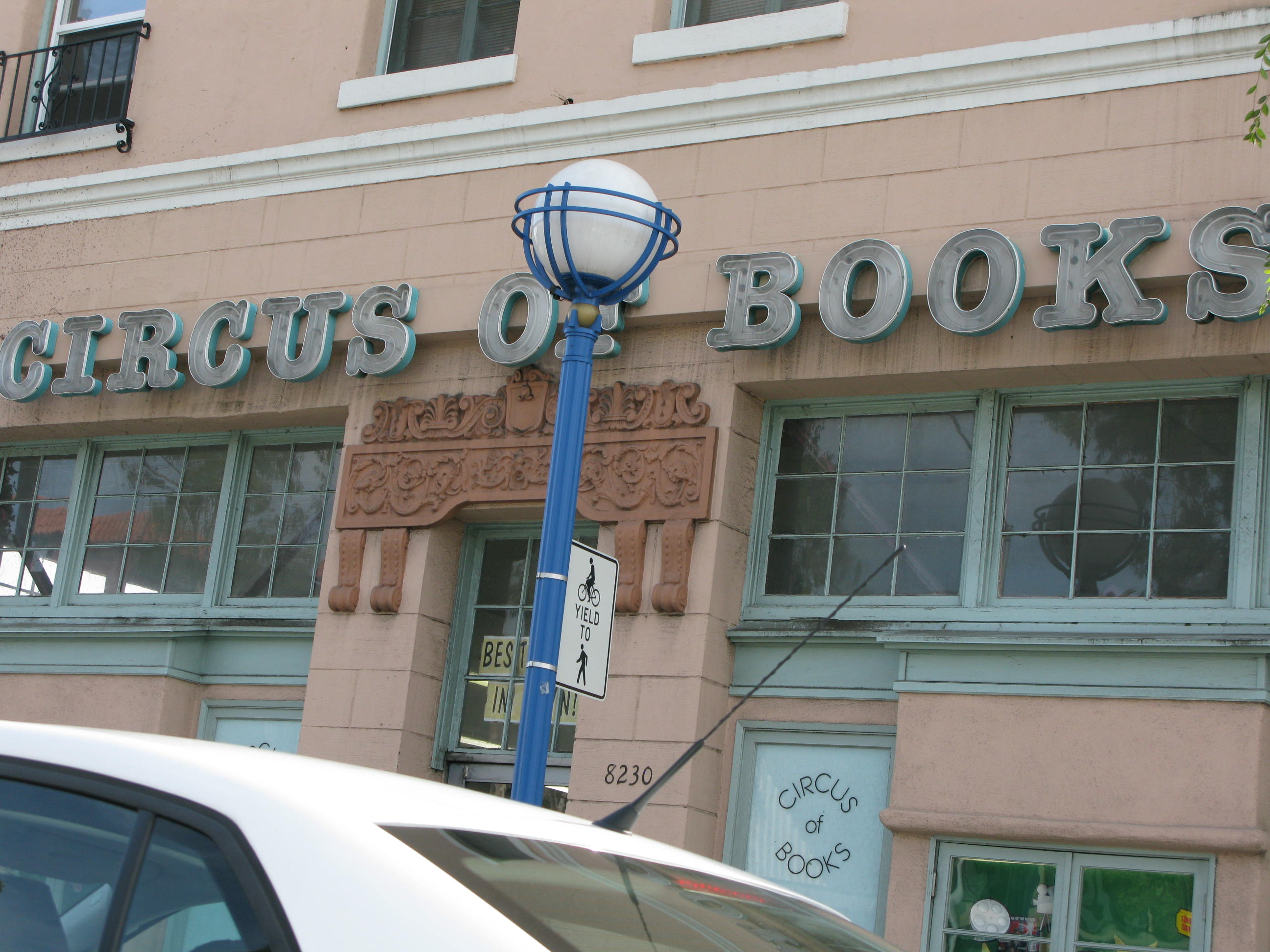
- Interactive map of the Circus of Books area

General information
- Type: Bookstore
- Coordinates: 34.090581°N 118.368242°W
- Opened: 1960s

Website
- circusofbooks.com

Circus of Books, also known as Chi Chi LaRue's Circus, is a bookstore and gay pornography shop in West Hollywood, California. It was established in the 1960s as "Book Circus", and in the past also had branches in the Silver Lake and Sherman Oaks neighborhoods of Los Angeles.

As notable Los Angeles gay cruising spots of the late 20th Century, both the West Hollywood and Silver Lake locations are now considered important sites of Los Angeles' gay history.

== History ==
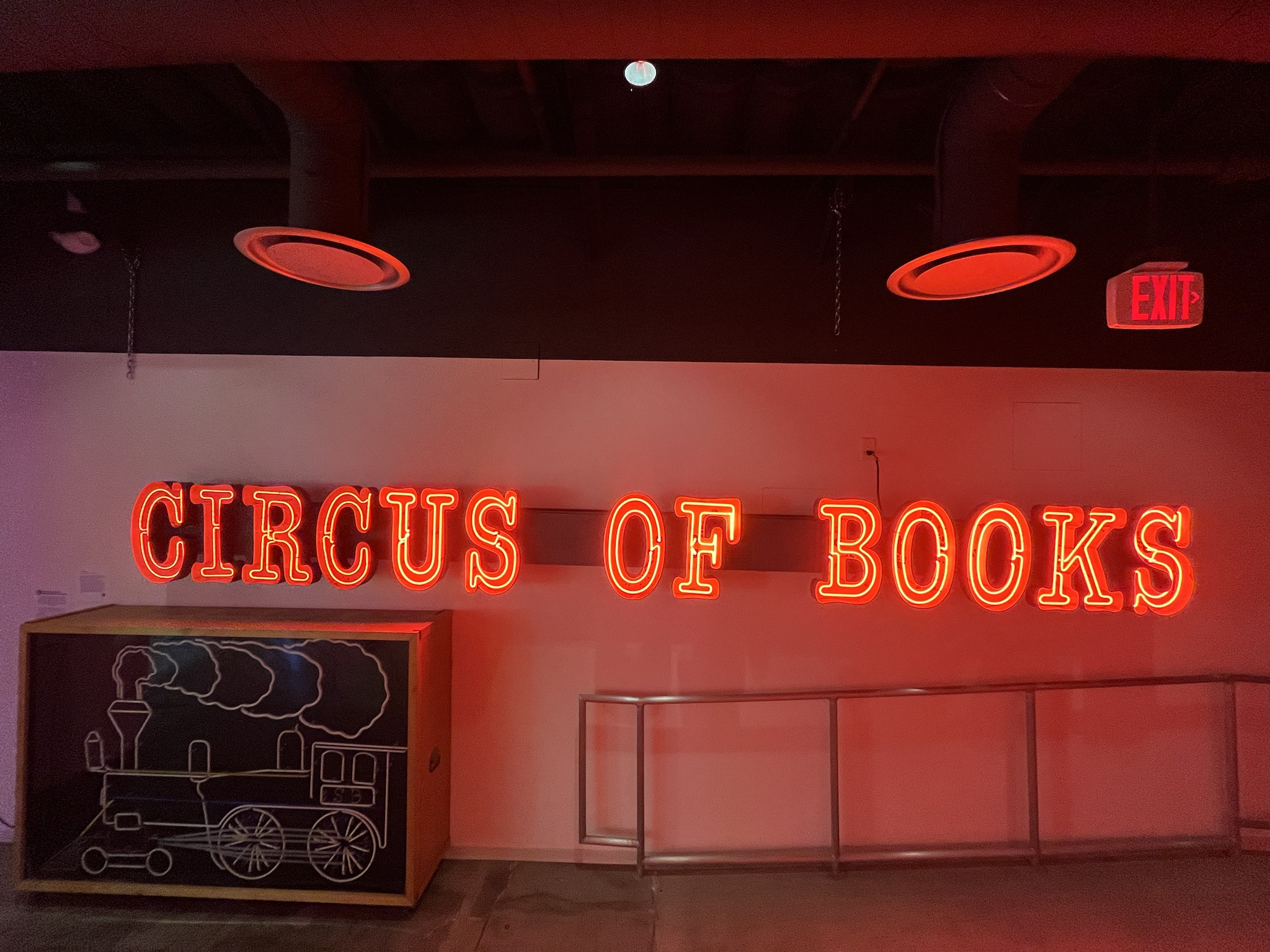
Sign from Circus of Books (1980s)

The store opened in the 1960s as Book Circus at 8230 Santa Monica Boulevard in West Hollywood. In 1982, when the owner was having financial problems, it was taken over by Barry Mason, a former special effects engineer and inventor, and his wife Karen, a former journalist, who had been working as distributors for Larry Flynt's publications. They renamed it Circus of Books and opened the Silver Lake branch. In addition to gay porn and adult toys, the store stocked back-list paperbacks, novels by LGBTQ writers, science fiction books, Bibles, and foreign newspapers.

In the 1980s, after the election of Ronald Reagan as president and especially after the publication of the Meese Report, law enforcement cracked down on pornography. Circus of Books was caught in an FBI sting and Barry Mason was prosecuted; his lawyer mounted a First Amendment defence and he was let off after a guilty plea by the corporation. In 1989 the Los Angeles County Sheriff's Department ordered that the West Hollywood store close from 2 AM to 6 AM after complaints that it attracted hustlers. A third branch in Sherman Oaks was forced to close in the 1990s because it was too close to an elementary school.

Business declined in the 21st century. The Silver Lake branch closed on August 8, 2016. (A marijuana dispensary occupies the former space, although the original sign remains.) The West Hollywood location closed on February 9, 2019, with the owners' daughter Rachel Mason, an artist, musician, and filmmaker, stating that the easy accessibility of gay pornography and cruising apps like Grindr replaced the need for a spot like Circus of Books.

The West Hollywood location reopened on January 18, 2020 as Chi Chi LaRue's Circus, with porn director and drag queen Chi Chi LaRue acquiring the store from the Masons, although unlike the original Circus of Books the reopened store has more upscale product offerings.

== Documentary film ==
The documentary film Circus of Books, directed by Rachel Mason, had its world premiere at the Tribeca Film Festival on April 26, 2019. It was the opening night gala presentation at the 2019 Outfest film festival. As of April 2020, the film was streamed by Netflix.

== See also ==
- Museum of Neon Art, which has neon signage from the West Hollywood location.
