= 2025 Donald Trump speech at the United Nations =

Address by U.S. president

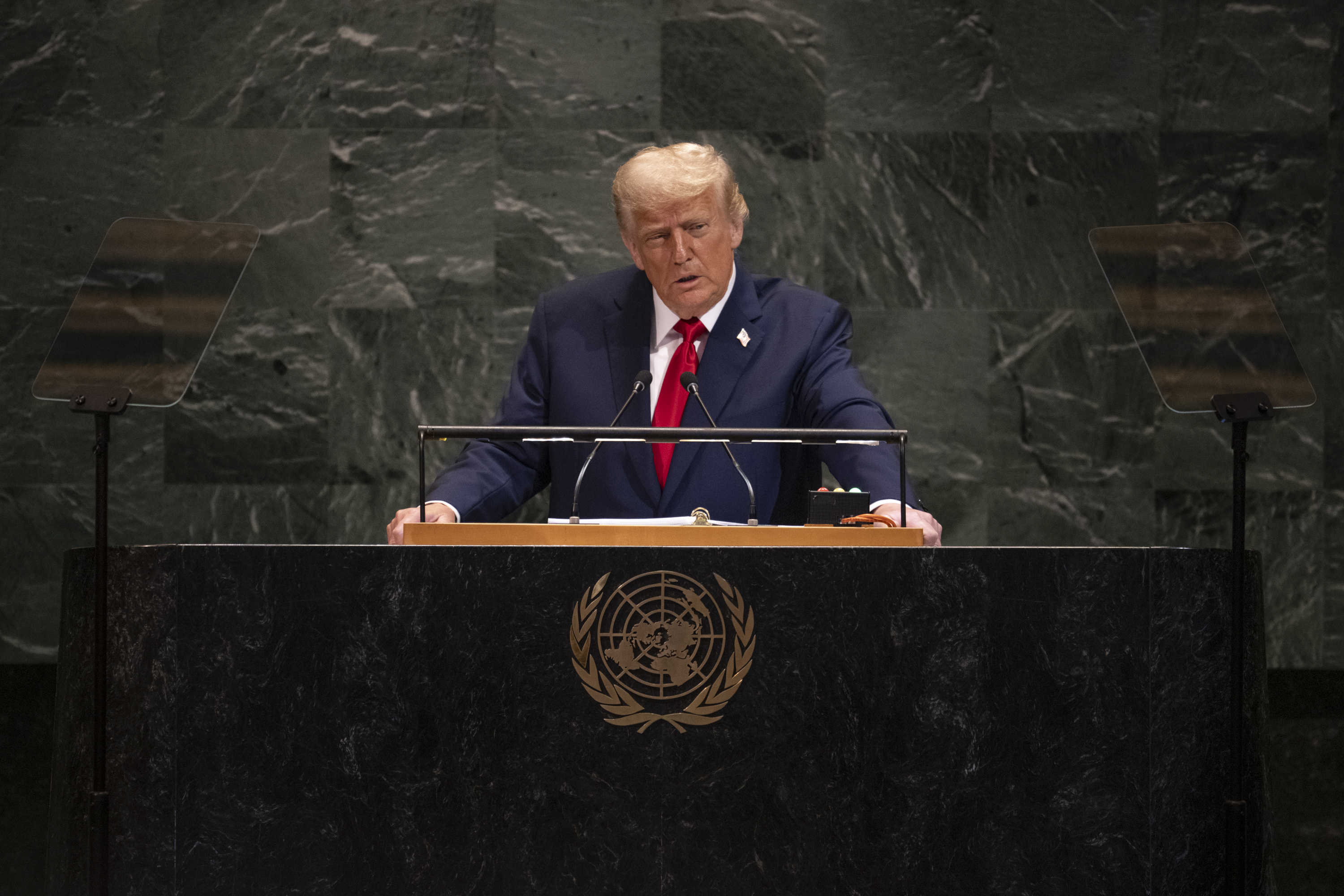
- Date: September 23, 2025
- Duration: 57 minutes
- Venue: United Nations General Assembly
- Location: United Nations General Assembly Building, New York City, U.S.

On September 23, 2025, United States President Donald Trump delivered a speech during the general debate of the eightieth session of the United Nations General Assembly. He spoke for 57 minutes.

== Escalator incident ==
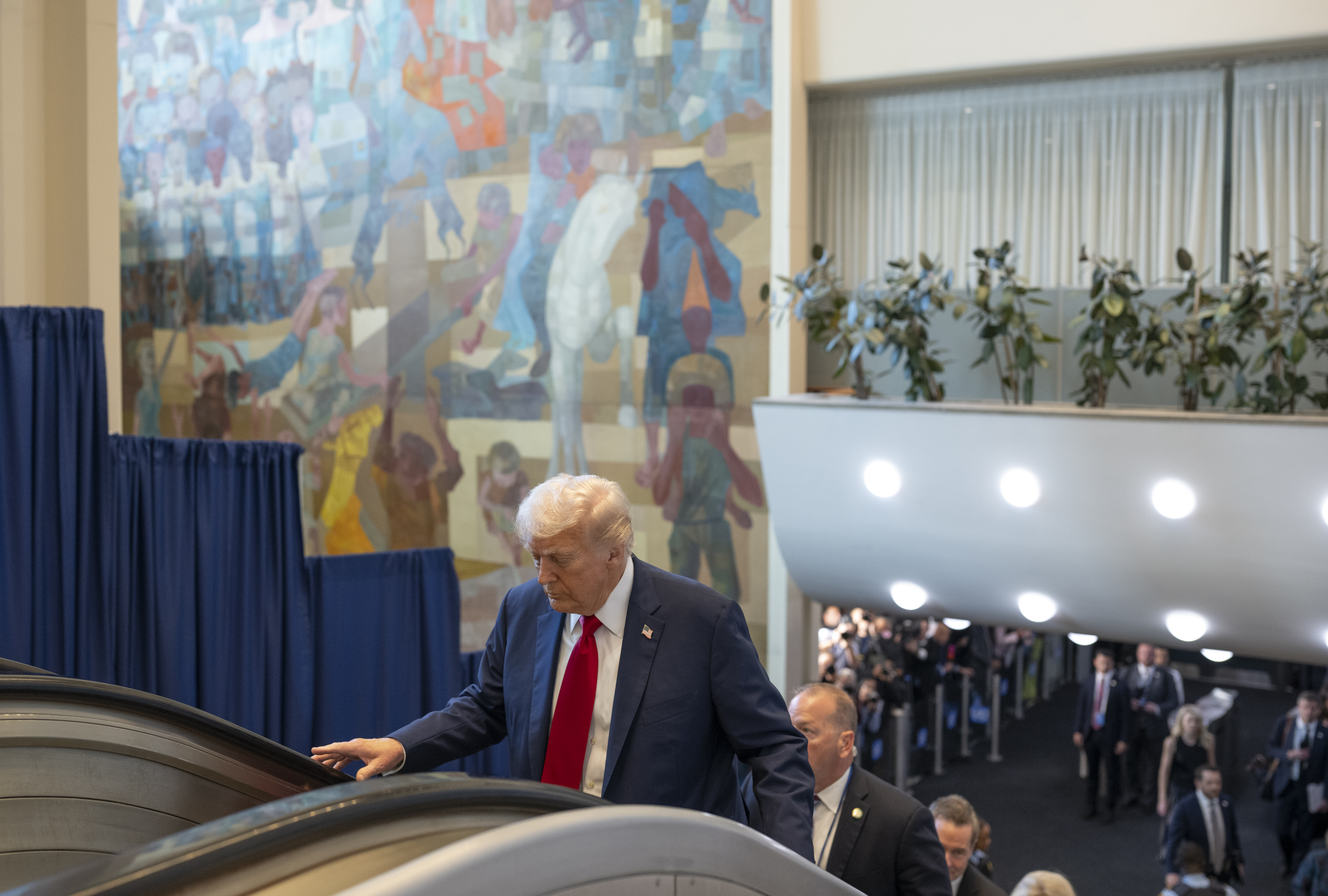
Trump using the escalator before his speech

Prior to President Trump's speech, an escalator in the United Nations General Assembly Building stopped as he and Melania Trump were stepping onto it. Afterwards, the President demanded an investigation alleging sabotage and called for the arrest of those involved. In response, conservative political commentator Jesse Watters suggested that the United States should either leave or "bomb" the UN.

== Content ==
President Trump condemned illegal immigration and called climate change a "con job". He criticized his European allies for investing in renewable energy and opening their borders to "a force of illegal aliens like nobody has ever seen before," claiming "Both the immigration and suicidal energy ideas will be the death of Western Europe." He also criticized Russia for its conduct in the Russo-Ukrainian War, dismissing Russia as a "paper tiger" and not a "real military power" while threatening additional tariffs on the country. He mentioned a brief conversation with Brazilian President Luiz Inácio Lula da Silva moments before, announcing plans to meet with him next week after stating that they had an "excellent chemistry" and "embraced each other".

== Reception ==
The Wall Street Journal praised Trump's candor in telling the UN of its "growing irrelevance". The South China Morning Post said that the speech was evidence that "the United States under Trump is heading in a different direction from most countries."

== See also ==
- 2025 Donald Trump speech to a joint session of Congress
- Rhetoric of Donald Trump
