= Josh Johnson (comedian) =

American comedian and writer (born 1990)

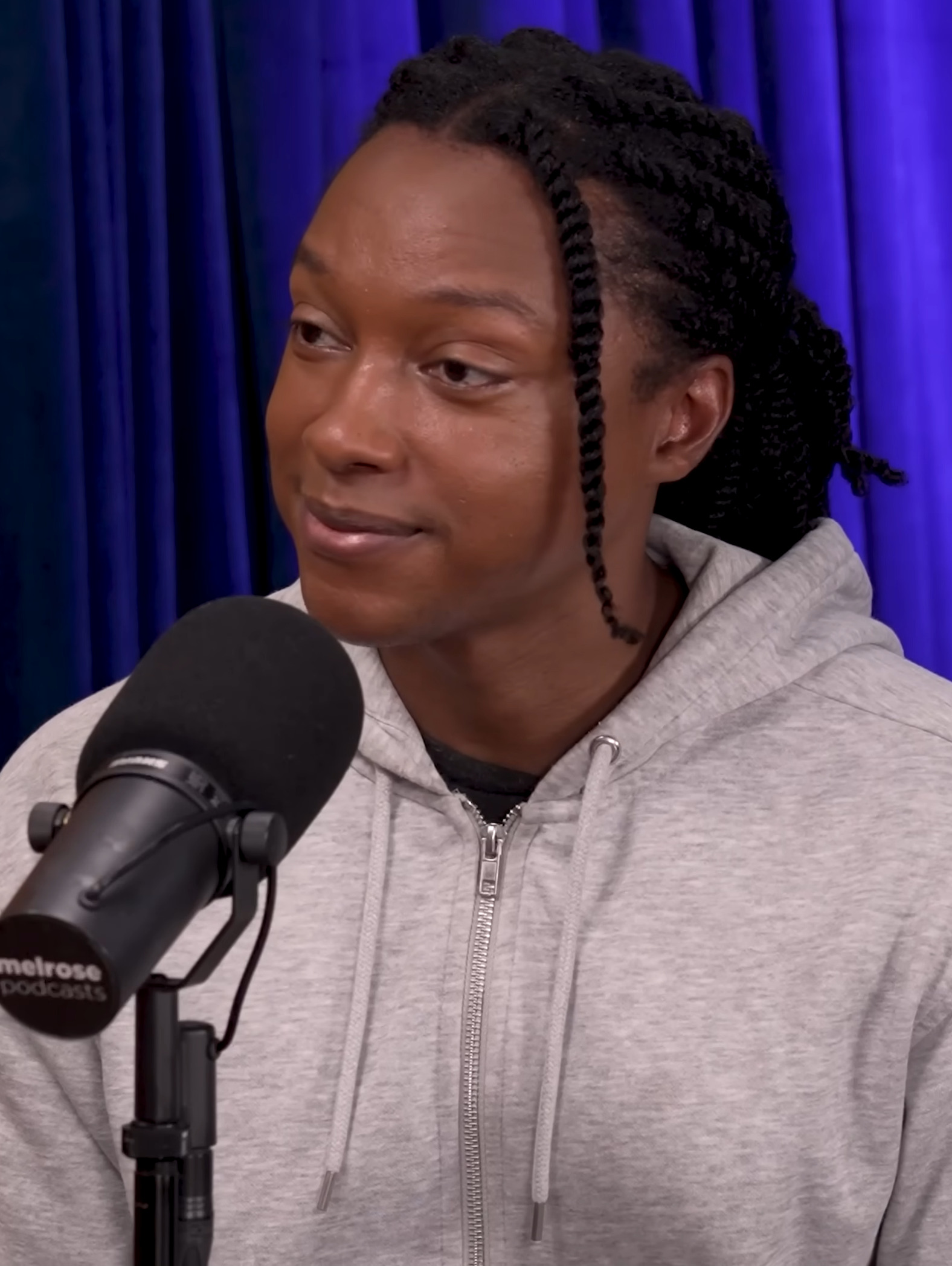
- Johnson in 2026
- Born: March 16, 1990 (age 36); Alexandria, Louisiana, U.S.
- Education: Centenary College of Louisiana
- Occupations: Comedian, writer
- Website: joshjohnsoncomedy.com

Josh Johnson (born March 16, 1990) is an American stand-up comedian and writer. He is best known for his work on The Daily Show, having first joined as a staff writer in 2017. Johnson became a correspondent in February 2024, and was later promoted to the weekly rotation of hosts in July 2025. His self-released frequent YouTube sets have aired over the 2020s.

He was also previously a writer and performer on The Tonight Show Starring Jimmy Fallon, and toured with Trevor Noah on his Loud & Clear tour for several years. In 2018, he was named New York's Funniest Stand Up at the New York Comedy Festival. He has released three hour-long comedy specials, # (Hashtag) (2021), Up Here Killing Myself (2023), and Symphony (2026). Along with The Daily Show, he is an internationally touring stand-up comedian. Johnson is the host of the 30th Annual Webby Awards.

== Early life ==
Johnson is from Alexandria, Louisiana. His mother was a special education teacher before having neurosurgery. After her surgery, she worked as a librarian at the same library Johnson visited after school. His father worked as a teacher. His parents were separated. His father died in 2016. He studied design and received a degree in lighting design for theater from Centenary College in 2012. While in college, he performed at open mic nights, inspired by Christopher Titus. He lived in Chicago before moving to New York City.

== Career ==
Johnson made his late-night debut on The Tonight Show Starring Jimmy Fallon, where he was also a writer and performer. Since 2017, he had been a writer for The Daily Show, where he made his debut as an on-air correspondent in 2024. His first half-hour special was released on Comedy Central in 2017. His comedic story "Catfishing the KKK" has been viewed more than 13 million times on YouTube.

In 2018, he appeared on the Netflix stand-up comedy series The Comedy Lineup. At the New York Comedy Festival that year, he was named New York's Funniest Stand Up. Beginning in 2019, Johnson toured with Trevor Noah on the Loud & Clear tour.

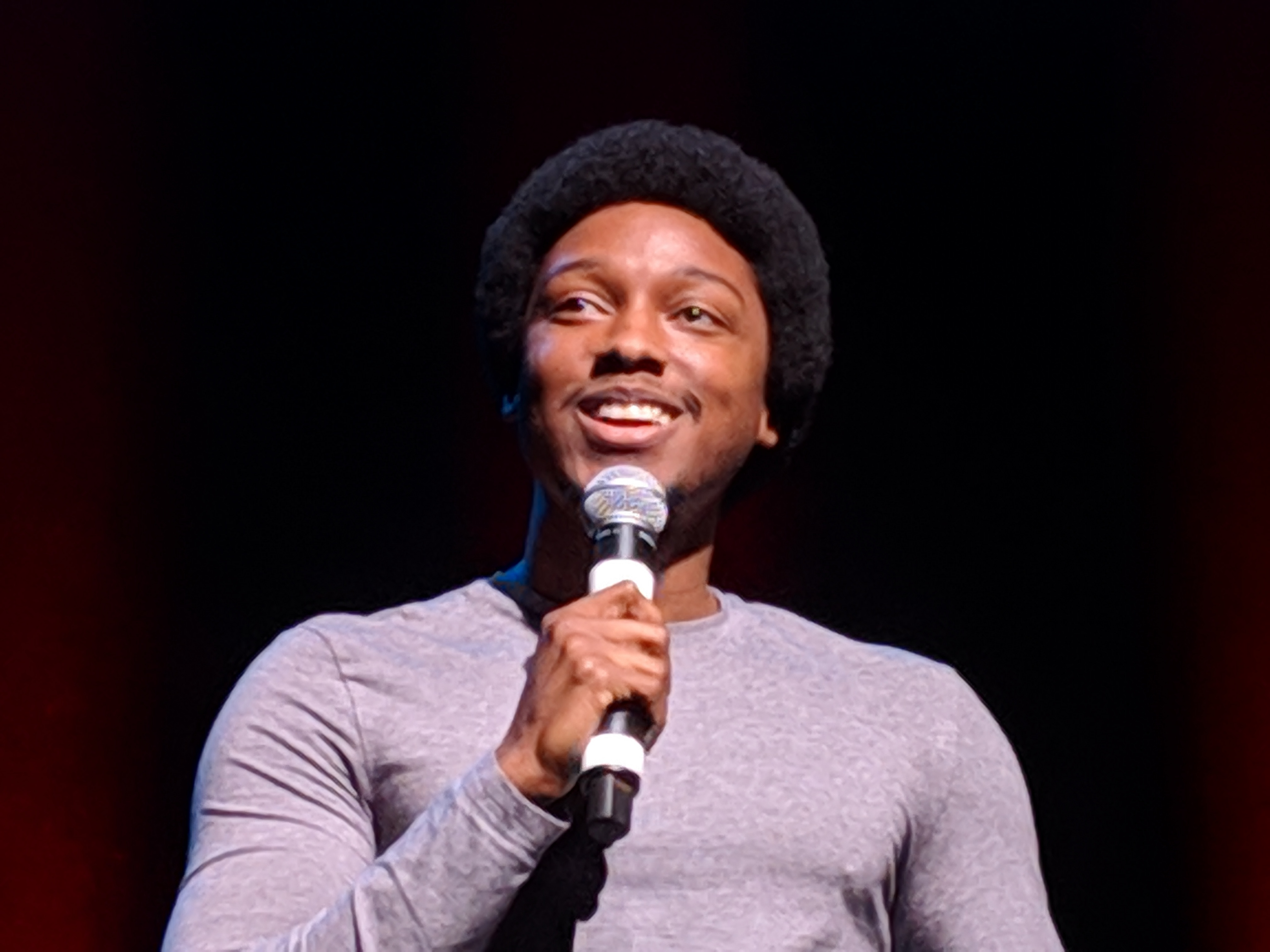
Johnson in 2019

Johnson's first hour-long stand-up special was # (Hashtag). It was released in June 2021 on Comedy Central to a positive reception, including being named one of the best comedy specials of 2021 by Vulture. Variety named him one of 10 Comics to Watch. Also that year, he took bits from his stand-up and interspersed music compositions in a 33-track mixtape album called Elusive, which he worked on with Mike Relm. His second special, Up Here Killing Myself, was released in February 2023 on Peacock.

Johnson voices Harry Buns on the Disney Channel series Kiff, which premiered in March 2023, his first acting role in a major scripted TV series.

Since 2023, Johnson has uploaded routines from his open mics and performances at the Comedy Cellar and his running tours every week on his personal YouTube channel. Critics have praised Johnson's videos for their remarkable frequency, thematic consistency, and depth. Starting July 22, 2025, Johnson was added to The Daily Show's rotation of hosts, alongside Jon Stewart, Desi Lydic, Michael Kosta, Ronny Chieng, and Jordan Klepper.

In January 2025, Johnson embarked on a North American stand-up comedy show tour, Flowers, starting in Minneapolis, Minnesota. The sold-out tour continued into 2026, when his Josh Johnson's Comedy Band Camp tour was announced, with European destinations included.

He was announced as the host for the 30th Annual Webby Awards, which aired in May 2026.

== Discography ==
Year	Name	Notes	Ref.
2018	I Like You		
2021	Elusive		
2021	#Hashtag		
2022	Channel Black		
2022	Some of the Best of the Josh Johnson Show, Vol. 1		
2023	Biden! Karen! OnlyFans! A Josh Johnson Basement Tape		
2023	Up Here Killing Myself		
2023	Some of the Best of the Josh Johnson Show, Vol. 2		
2023	Leaps		
2024	Josh Johnson: Live from Before		
2026	Josh Johnson: Symphony	HBO special	

== Filmography ==
Year	Title	Role	Notes
2017	The Tonight Show Starring Jimmy Fallon	N/A	Writer, 51 episodes
2017–present	The Daily Show	Himself, various	Writer (2017–2024); correspondent (2023–2025); co-host (2026–present)
2018	Genies	Josh	3 episodes, also writer
2023–2025	Kiff	Harry Buns (voice)	8 episodes, 1 special
2027	CoComelon: The Movie	TBA (voice)	
