= Wawa Gatheru =

American climate activist

Wanjiku Gatheru
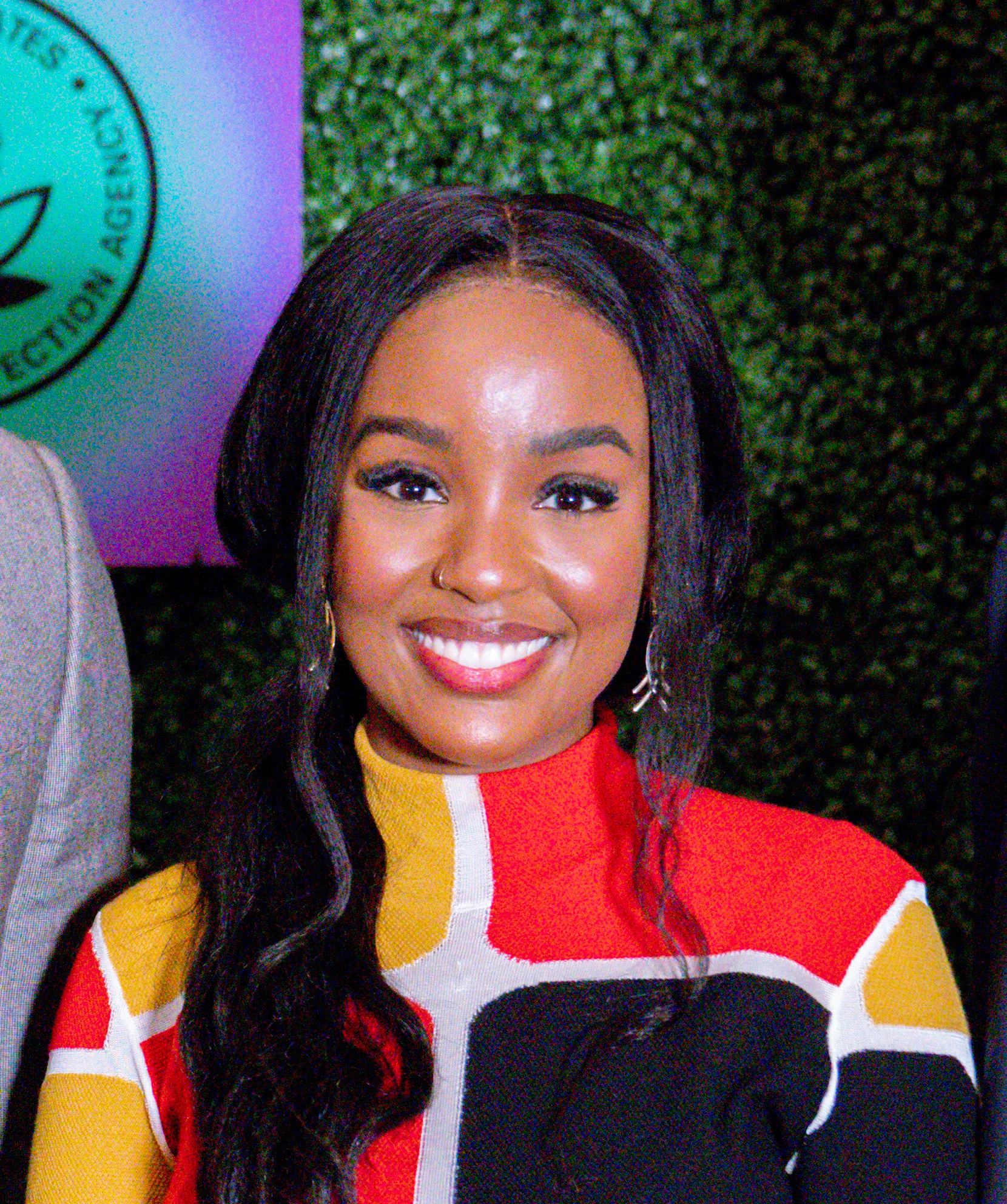
- Gatheru in 2023
- Other names: Wawa
- Education: University of Connecticut (BA); University of Oxford (MS)
- Occupation: Climate justice activist
- Organization: Black Girl Environmentalist
- Website: blackgirlenvironmentalist.org

Wanjiku "Wawa" Gatheru is an American climate justice activist. She is also a recipient of the coveted Rhodes Scholarship.

== Early life ==
Gatheru was born to Kenyan immigrants Mr and Mrs Gatheru from Mukurwe-ini Nyeri county and raised in the rural area of Pomfret, Connecticut, She became interested in climate activism at 15 and took classes in environmental science.

Gatheru attended the University of Connecticut. She received the Harry S. Truman, Rhodes, and Morris K. Udall and Stewart L. Udall Foundation's scholarship in 2019. She graduated magna cum laude in 2020 with a BA in Environmental studies and a minor in Urban and Community Studies. She earned her Master's from the University of Oxford in nature, society and environmental governance.

== Activism ==
Gatheru sought to advocate for Black women and non-binary people through writing and public speaking.

In 2022, she hosted the black eco-feminist summit, which was featured in the British Vogue. She was the board chair at the Environmental Media Association

== Achievements ==
Gatheru was recognized as a Young Futurist by The Root in 2020, a Grist 50 FIXER, and Glamour College Woman of the Year. In 2021, she was Victoria's Secret PINK Purpose Project Winner.

In January 2023, she appeared on the cover of Vogue alongside Billie Eilish. I She was also named Climate Creator to Watch by Pique Action and the Harvard T.H. Chan School of Public Health, became a member of the first-ever National Environmental Youth Advisory Council at the U.S. Environmental Protection Agency, and won a Trailblazer Award at Verdical Group's annual Net Zero Conference.

In 2024, Gatheru was named in Forbes 30 Under 30 List under Social Impact.
