= Job hugging =

Workplace trend describing employees remaining in roles amid economic uncertainty

Job hugging is a workplace trend in which employees remain in their current jobs despite feeling disengaged or seeing limited advancement opportunities, typically due to economic uncertainty. The term gained prominence in mid-2025 as a contrast to pandemic-era "job hopping" and the high voluntary turnover associated with the Great Resignation.

== Background ==
The term emerged amid muted labor-market churn in the United States, with job openings declining and voluntary quits remaining low by post-pandemic standards. U.S. Job Openings and Labor Turnover Survey (JOLTS) data for June 2025 showed 7.4 million job openings, with 3.1 million quits and a quits rate of 2.1%—down from the 3% peak reached during the Great Resignation in 2022. Surveys cited in business reporting showed reduced confidence among job seekers about available opportunities and increased caution among employers about staffing levels.

Workplace commentators linked the behavior to several factors: a slower hiring environment, concerns about artificial intelligence displacing jobs, and a perception that external opportunities had become scarcer and harder to secure. The trend was characterized as involving employees who stay even when unmotivated or not advancing, prioritizing stability over career growth.

== Media coverage ==
Korn Ferry introduced the phrase in August 2025, describing employees "holding onto their jobs for dear life"; a company spokesman later said the firm might have coined the term but could not say for certain. Fast Company and Business Insider reported on the term later that month, framing it as an inversion of job hopping tied to reduced quits and slower hiring. By fall 2025, the term had appeared in The New York Times and on The Daily Show, and explainers in The Week and The Independent had characterized job hugging as a response to a difficult job market, comparing it with earlier workplace narratives such as the Great Resignation and quiet quitting.

Coverage also addressed potential downsides. Peter Cappelli, a professor at the Wharton School, noted that workers who feel stuck in place may experience stunted career development and miss out on the higher raises typically associated with changing jobs. Cappelli also observed that reduced turnover can stall movement in the broader job market, since fewer vacancies open up for other workers.

== Criticism ==
Some commentators described job hugging as an HR "buzzword" that repackages long-observed worker behavior rather than identifying a new phenomenon. Critics argued that the label can distract from structural issues such as low productivity growth and workplace disengagement. The Independent described the term as a "cute new term" that spread online, framing it as a reaction to labor-market conditions rather than a distinct form of workplace attachment. Others noted that overall unemployment and layoffs outside specific sectors remained relatively low in 2025, limiting the extent to which job hugging mapped onto generalized labor-market distress.

== See also ==
- Great Resignation
- Job security
- Labor mobility
- Quiet quitting
- Quiet cracking
