= Kevin Nguyen =

American writer of Vietnamese descent

- Occupations: Author, editor
- Website: knguyen.org

Kevin Nguyen is an American author and editor of Vietnamese descent. He is the author of New Waves and Mỹ Documents, as well as the Features Editor at The Verge.

== Career ==
Early in his career, Nguyen worked at a startup called Oyster where Nguyen served as the Editorial Director and launched the Oyster Review. After Oyster was acquired by Google, Nguyen worked as the Editorial Director of Google Play Books. He then became an editor at GQ and is now currently the Features Editor at The Verge. His journalism work has been nominated as finalists for the Pulitzer Prize and National Magazine Award.

Nguyen's writing has additionally appeared in The New York Times, The Atlantic, The Paris Review, The New Republic, and other publications, as well as the horror anthology, Tiny Nightmares: Very Short Stories of Horror, published by Catapult in 2020. He also formerly wrote a book column for Grantland. He is currently at work on a biography of the Japanese composer Ryuichi Sakamoto.

=== New Waves ===
In 2020, Nguyen published his debut novel, New Waves, which follows the lives of Lucas, a young Asian American who works in customer service, and Margo, a Black software engineer, as they work at a startup and soon try to undermine it. He had gradually written it in his Notes app, then a Google Doc, while taking the subway; at the time, he was working in tech.

New Waves was named a best book of 2020 by Vanity Fair, GQ, NPR, the New York Public Library, and others. Of the book, The New York Times compared Lucas and Margo to Jay Gatsby and Nick Carraway in F. Scott Fitzgerald's The Great Gatsby and concluded that "It’s exciting to see the workplace novel making a literary comeback." The Observer lauded Nguyen's approach to grief and stated that "though death dominates the proceedings, New Waves itself is a novel that is very much alive."

=== Mỹ Documents ===
In May 2025, Nguyen released his second novel, Mỹ Documents, published by One World Books. Based around the conceit of "what if Vietnamese people were detained in camps in an echo of Japanese incarceration," the book follows a Vietnamese family torn apart by an executive order calling for the incarceration of Vietnamese Americans after a string of terror attacks perpetrated by a few members of the community. He had begun writing it "on and off over five years" starting in 2018.

Many publications called Mỹ Documents reflective of the contemporary political situation faced by immigrants in the United States. Time named it a best book of 2025. The Los Angeles Times called it a "rich, gripping novel that lands squarely as a mirror of our contemporary moral squalor." The New York Times lauded its ambition, its humor, and its revelatory power. Tony Tulathimutte said it was one "you really hate to see in the company of words like timely, prescient, or prophetic" and remarked that "the only stark divergence from our reality in the world of Mỹ Documents is that its journalists seem a lot more principled, courageous, and effective than the ones currently standing by and shrugging as the breathing tube gets yanked out of democracy."

With regard to the critical reception, Nguyen stated in Lithub that he never intended to write a "timely" novel, nor a "social justice fanfic" or work of "political art" in which narrative is flattened for the sake of a political argument. Overall, he expressed worries that the novel's "actual conflicts and themes had been obfuscated by the emphasis on the news cycle."
