= Rachel Mason =

American artist

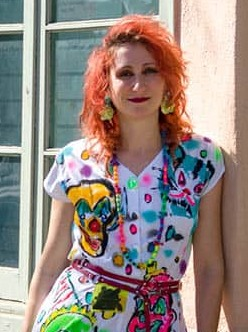
- Born: Los Angeles, California, U.S.
- Known for: Performance, sculpture, music, film
- Spouse: Buck Angel

Rachel Mason is an American filmmaker whose work includes performance art, music, films and multimedia projects.

== Early life and education ==
Mason was born in Los Angeles, California, to Karen and Barry Mason, a Jewish family. She has an older brother, Micah, and a younger brother, Josh. Her mother was initially a journalist and her father worked as a special effects engineer in the film industry. When her parents got into financial difficulties in the mid-1970s, they got jobs distributing porn magnate Larry Flynt's Hustler magazine as well as gay porn publications. In 1982, Mason's parents took over the gay porn bookshop Circus of Books in West Hollywood, without telling their children what they did for a living. They also produced gay porn videos starring Jeff Stryker.

Mason attended Wonderland Avenue Elementary School, Los Angeles Center for Enriched Studies (LACES) and Cleveland High School in Reseda. Mason received a BFA in art from UCLA and an MFA from Yale University. In New York she worked as an assistant to video and performance artist Joan Jonas.

== Career ==
Her debut feature film The Lives of Hamilton Fish is a musical art film with no dialogue. Mason often performed the entire soundtrack live in front of an audience while touring the film to museums and festivals. The film's story is based on a true coincidence Mason discovered. Two obituaries of two men, both named Hamilton Fish, were printed on the front page of a newspaper from January 16, 1936. Hamilton Fish (aka Albert Fish) had been a serial killer while Hamilton Fish II had been a statesman. The latter was a descendant of 18th century politician Alexander Hamilton, who was killed in a duel by Aaron Burr; a large part of the film was shot on location at the Morris–Jumel Mansion where Burr once lived. The film also portrays one of the first known psychics, the White Crow, aka Leonora Piper.

The Lives of Hamilton Fish premiered at London's Raindance Film Festival in 2015, and Mason performed with the film as a live performance at museums including LACMA, Art in General, Henry Art Gallery, Corcoran Gallery, Albany Institute of History and Art, The Horse Hospital (London), Pineapple Underground Film Festival (Hong Kong), and Night Gallery (Los Angeles).

Mason's 2019 documentary feature film Circus of Books was acquired by Netflix and executive produced by Ryan Murphy. It is based on the story of the historic gay landmark Circus of Books, a book and magazine store that her parents ran from 1982 until 2019. The film had its world premiere at the Tribeca Film Festival on April 26, 2019 and was the opening night gala presentation at the 2019 Outfest film festival. It was available for streaming on Netflix on April 22, 2020.

"Rachel's art is fluid — it's always easing in and out of different forms. She is a songwriter and performer; she's an actress, of a sort, who performs as if channeling the poetic inner souls of controversial leaders like Fidel Castro and Manuel Noriega." -- Claudine Ise

In October 2023, Mason joined the Museum of Neon Art's "Light in the Dark: Queen Narratives in Neon" exhibition, participating in a panel discussion about LGBTQ+ connections to neon art and the Glendale, California community. Other panelists included museum trustee Eric Lynxwiler, sex educator Buck Angel, neon artist Dani Bonnet, glendaleOUT member Paul Manchester, and activist Shant Jaltorossian of GALAS LGBTQ+ Armenian Society.

In June 2024, Mason's documentary An Update on Our Family premiered at the Tribeca Festival, centering on family vloggers Myka and James Stauffer. It premiered in January 2025, on HBO. That same year, Mason directed and produced Last Take: Rust and the Story of Halyna centering on Halyna Hutchins, for Hulu.

== Personal life ==
Rachel Mason's life partner is Buck Angel. She has a son from a previous relationship.
