= An Update on Our Family =

American documentary series

- Genre: Documentary
- Directed by: Rachel Mason
- Country of origin: United States
- Original language: English
- No. of episodes: 3

Production
- Executive producers: Rachel Mason; Rachael Knudsen; Max Heckman; Chad Mumm; Mark W. Olsen; Jennifer O'Connell; Lizzie Fox
- Producers: Casey Meurer; Julee Metz; Jasmine Luoma
- Cinematography: John P. Campbell; Gretchen Warthen
- Editors: Sean Stewart; Joan Educate; Giovanni P. Autran; David Feinberg
- Running time: 43-50 minutes
- Production companies: HBO Documentary Films; Vox Media Studios

Original release
- Network: HBO
- Release: January 15 – January 29, 2025

An Update on Our Family is an American documentary series directed and produced by Rachel Mason. It explores the world of family vlogging, primarily exploring the case of Myka and James Stauffer, and their adoption of a child, Huxley.

It had its world premiere at the Tribeca Festival on June 6, 2024, It premiered January 15, 2025, on HBO. It was inspired by a New York Magazine article by Caitlin Moscatello.

== Premise ==
The series explores the world of family vlogging, primarily exploring the case of Myka and James Stauffer, and their adoption of a child, Huxley, which the two documented on their YouTube channel. Huxley was later diagnosed with autism and ADHD, with the Stauffers deciding to rehouse him.

== Episodes ==
No.	Title	Directed by	Original release date	U.S. viewers (millions)
1	"Welcome to Our Family"	Rachel Mason	January 15, 2025	N/A
2	"Damn Good Mom"	Rachel Mason	January 22, 2025	N/A
3	"Where's Huxley?"	Rachel Mason	January 29, 2025	N/A

== Production ==
Rachel Mason reached out to Myka and James Stauffer about participating in the documentary, hoping to hear their side, however, they declined to participate. Mason opted to blur all of the children who appear in the series to protect their privacy, and consent.

== Reception ==
=== Critical reception ===
The review aggregator website Rotten Tomatoes reported a 100% approval rating with an average rating of 7.80/10, based on five critic reviews.

Andrew Parker of The Gate gave the series an eight out of ten, writing: "Rachel Mason’s heartbreaking and skillfully assembled three part documentary series looks at the darker side of family vlogging culture, and stands as a pointed cautionary tale about a modern culture that thrives on attention, greed, and rage." John Anderson of The Wall Street Journal wrote: "What is formally interesting about Ms. Mason’s series, and something worthy of respect, is her lack of interest in objectivity. There’s no flock of talking heads offering up some semblance of "balance". Ms. Mason gives us the goods."
