= Kyla Scanlon =

American economics writer and author

- Born: 1997 (age 28–29); Louisville, Kentucky, U.S.
- Education: Western Kentucky University
- Occupations: Content creator; educator; author
- Years active: 2019–present
- Website: kylascanlon.com

Kyla Scanlon (born 1997) is an American financial content creator, educator, and author.

== Early life and education ==
Kyla Scanlon was born in Louisville, Kentucky in 1997. Scanlon graduated from Western Kentucky University's Gordon Ford College of Business in 2019, triple majoring in financial management, economics, and business data analytics.

== Career ==
From 2019 to 2021, Scanlon worked in Los Angeles for Capital Group in their asset management division, conducting macroeconomic analysis and modeling investment strategies. Scanlon later founded Bread, a financial education company.

In June 2022, Scanlon coined the term "vibecession", a portmanteau of the words vibes and recession, in her newsletter about Americans' view of their economy.

Her first book, In This Economy?: How Money and Markets Really Work, was published in 2024.

In 2026, Scanlon became a contributor to CNN.

== Bibliography ==
- Scanlon, Kyla (2024). In This Economy?. Crown Currency. ISBN 9780593727874.
