= List of The Daily Show episodes (2022) =

- No. of episodes: 133

Release
- Original network: Comedy Central
- Original release: January 18 – December 8, 2022

Season chronology
- ← Previous; 2021 episodes Next → 2023 episodes

This is a list of episodes for The Daily Show with Trevor Noah, Comedy Central's nightly satirical news program, in 2022. This is the final year of The Daily Show to be hosted by Trevor Noah, who announced on September 29, 2022, that he would depart the show by the end of the year. Noah's final episode aired on December 8.

For the first three months of 2022, The Daily Show taped its episodes in a studio One Astor Plaza, the Times Square headquarters of Comedy Central parent ViacomCBS; the show had moved to the temporary, audience-free home in September 2021 as part of COVID-19 pandemic precautions (before then, and after the pandemic began in March 2020, Noah taped episodes from his apartment). On April 11, the show returned to its longtime, revamped home at NEP Studio 52 in Manhattan's Hell's Kitchen district.

== 2022 episodes ==
=== January ===
No.		Guest(s)	Promotion
3632	January 18	Bernice King	King Center for Nonviolent Social Change; It Starts with Me.
Trevor begins the year by discussing Australia's deportation of unvaccinated tennis star Novak Djokovic and the CDC's issuance of confusing COVID-19 guidelines.
3633	January 19	Ariana DeBose	West Side Story
A look at the controversy surrounding UK Prime Minister Boris Johnson partying during the COVID lockdown; "Jordan Klepper Fingers the Pulse" (Jordan heads to Washington, D.C., on the one-year anniversary of the January 6 United States Capitol attack).
3634	January 20	Francis Ngannou	UFC
A look at the partisan fight over voting rights legislation; Desi Lydic talks to "microinfluencers" encouraging vaccination; Francis Ngannou discusses his childhood in Cameroon and advocating for improvements on pay and protection for fellow UFC fighters.
3635	January 24	Jay Shetty	Calm
Trevor looks at the NFL playoffs and discusses the doxing of "West Elm Caleb" amid claims that he ghosted potential dates.
3636	January 25	W. Kamau Bell	We Need to Talk About Cosby
Trevor examines Joe Biden's insult of a reporter over a hot mic, China's efforts to contain COVID-19 before the Olympics, and a digital update to the SAT's; "BEEFZUZ" examines why musicians and celebrities are having feuds with each other.
3637	January 26	Rick Glassman	As We See It
Trevor covers Supreme Court Justice Stephen Breyer's pending retirement; "If You Don't Know, Now You Know" (a look at efforts to bar members of Congress from directly trading stocks).
3638	January 27	Lindsey Vonn	Rise: My Story
Roy Wood, Jr. on the COVID-19 chaos in U.S. schools; "America: WTF?" (Ronny Chieng rants over American's obsession with football, pre-game tailgating, and prescription drug ads).
3639	January 31	U.S. Representative Barbara Lee	Barbara Lee: Speaking Truth to Power
Desi Lydic on the Canada convoy protest; Trevor on the Joe Rogan/Spotify controversy.

=== February ===
No.		Guest(s)	Promotion
3640	February 1	Bakari Sellers	Who Are Your People?
Thoughts on Tom Brady's retirement, The New York Times' purchase of Wordle, and a brawl at Golden Corral going viral; Ronny Chieng on the popularity of natural burials; Bakari Sellers on "kids learning where other kids came from."
3641	February 2	Gugu Mbatha-Raw	The Girl Before
Trevor on Vladimir Putin's defensiveness about Russian aggression toward Ukraine; "Black in Business" (Roy Wood, Jr. on a breakfast cereal made by and marketed toward African-Americans); Gugu Mbatha-Raw on utilizing American and British accents and being a UNHCR goodwill ambassador.
3642	February 3	Johnny Knoxville	Jackass Forever
Roy Wood Jr. weighs in on discrimination against Black coaches in the NFL, "Project: Conspiracy" ("Kevin Matthew Kelp" on sewer systems in America); Johnny Knoxville on the aftermath of his controversial George Floyd comments, and why a stunt with a bull for Jackass Forever may be his last.
3643	February 7	Michael S. Regan	Environmental Protection Agency
Thoughts on sexual harassment tools in Facebook's Metaverse, Mike Pence defending his actions on January 6, and Donald Trump saving his correspondences with Kim Jong-un; Trevor has an in-depth look at Joe Rogan's racist language on his Spotify-hosted podcast, and why artists are pulling their content from the streamer as a result; EPA administrator Michael S. Regan on clean energy and environmental justice.
3644	February 8	Robert Glasper	Black Radio III
Thoughts on "blue states" ending COVID-19 mask mandates and a jet company offering a "mile high club" experience; Robert Glasper performs "Heaven's Here" (a song from Black Radio III) and talks of being "the Bruce Lee of the piano."
3645	February 9	Frances Haugen	N/A
"If You Don't Know, Now You Know" (how racism influenced the development of America's highway system); "Dul-Sayin'" (with Jesse Williams' help, Dulcé Sloan explores romance novels written by Black women); Frances Haugen discusses blowing the whistle on Facebook's anger-stoking algorithm and how social media affects kids' mental health.
3646	February 10	Ahmir "Questlove" Thompson	Summer of Soul
Trevor on Canadian truckers blocking the Ambassador Bridge, and why their protest has the support of American conservatives; "I Apologize For Talking While You Were Talking" (Ronny Chieng and Roy Wood, Jr. on the Winter Olympics' opening ceremony and COVID-19 restrictions, as well as the lead-up to Super Bowl LVI).
3647	February 14	India Arie	N/A
Trevor and India Arie spend the full episode discussing why she left Spotify, conscious and unconscious racism, fair treatment for artists, adjusting to different audiences, and her life-changing moment with Maya Angelou.
3648	February 15	Hasan Minhaj	Hasan Minhaj: The King's Jester
A look at efforts by conservatives to ban books from school libraries; "CP Time" (Roy Wood, Jr. on Black Winter Olympians); Hasan Minhaj discusses his work on TDS, being a father, and his new Netflix standup special.
3649	February 16	Willie O'Ree Jessica Kingdon	National Hockey League Ascension
Trevor on a settlement in the lawsuit against Prince Andrew, Tinder's blind date feature, the Catholic Church's voiding of a pastor's baptisms, and Nelson Mandela's former home becoming a luxury hotel; Willie O'Ree recalls the racism he encountered in becoming the NHL's first Black player, and his present-day efforts to encourage kids of color to take up hockey; Jessica Kingdon on parallels between the American Dream and China's hard work ethos.
3650	February 17	Janicza Bravo	Zola
"Jordan Klepper Fingers the Pulse" (Jordan travels to Ottawa to cover the Canada convoy protest); "If You Don't Know, Now You Know" (the controversy over drill rap and the root causes of violence surrounding it).
3651	February 28	Samantha Power	United States Agency for International Development
Trevor examines the global resistance to Russia's invasion of Ukraine, while Michael Kosta reacts to Ukrainians' heroism; USAID administrator Samantha Power weighs in on international reactions to the crisis.

=== March ===
No.		Guest(s)	Promotion
3652	March 1	Bob Odenkirk	Comedy Comedy Comedy Drama: A Memoir
A look at the escalating Russian invasion of Ukraine; Roy Wood, Jr. delivers his 2022 "State of Black S**t" address; Bob Odenkirk on his heart attack and how Better Call Saul came to be.
3653	March 2	Stacey Abrams	Level Up: Rise Above the Hidden Forces Holding Your Business Back
Trevor covers Belarus' president revealing Russia's invasion plans, the baseball lockout, and AMC Theatres' variable ticket pricing; Stacey Abrams discusses joining Georgia's governor's race and the importance of ensuring voting access.
3654	March 3	Serena Williams	Serena Ventures; King Richard
How Ukrainians are showing compassion toward Russian soldiers; Desi Lydic dives into the history of the bra.
3655	March 7	Jesse Williams	Take Me Out
Thoughts on William Barr denouncing yet still supporting Donald Trump, Andrew Cuomo blaming cancel culture for his resignation as New York's governor, and the "People's Convoy" in Washington.
3656	March 8	Sadhguru	Save Soil
Trevor on the Biden Administration's ban on Russian oil and Ukrainian women on the front lines; Sadhguru discusses how industrialized farming affects soil conditions, crop growth, and food production.
3657	March 9	Dolly Parton & James Patterson	Run, Rose, Run
The Daily Show's "Cancel Cam" catches New Yorkers saying the wrong things; Dolly Parton and James Patterson on their collaboration and the importance of reading.
3658	March 10	Sandra Oh	Turning Red
Trevor examines economic retaliations against Russia's financial interests and oligarchs, as well as Kim Kardashian's "get your [expletive] ass up and work" advice for women; Sandra Oh on the ways Pixar films help young people learn difficult conversations and how original storytelling by women impacts film and TV.
3659	March 14	Evan Rachel Wood	Phoenix Rising
Coverage on the latest developments in the Russian invasion of Ukraine and Tom Brady's un-retirement from the NFL; Evan Rachel Wood on the need to speak up about domestic violence.
3660	March 15	Deepak Chopra	Abundance: The Inner Path to Wealth
Trevor on how the Kanye West/Kim Kardashian/Pete Davidson scandal shines a light on the harassment women face when trying to leave a relationship; "Back in Black with Lewis Black" (Lewis offers ideas on making the Oscars ceremony watchable); Deepak Chopra gives Freudian analysis of Vladimir Putin and the importance of measuring success through joy.
3661	March 16	Quinta Brunson	Abbott Elementary
Coverage of Ukrainian President Volodymyr Zelenskyy's addresses to the U.S. Congress, Vladimir Putin's claims that Russia is being canceled, and how Americans are supporting Ukraine; "Everything is Stupid" (Ronny Chieng rants about the Metaverse); Quinta Brunson on the style and work environment of Abbott Elementary and why teachers should be paid more.
3662	March 17	Tiffanie Drayton	Black American Refugee: Escaping the Narcissism of the American Dream
Trevor on President Biden's declaration of Vladimir Putin as a war criminal; Desi Lydic on how Russian restaurants in New York City have been adversely affected by anti-Russian protests; Tiffanie Drayton on how systemic oppression has created a caste system in America.

=== April ===
No.		Guest(s)	Promotion
3663	April 11	Ben Stiller	Severance
Trevor on the surge of COVID-19 cases among Washington's political elite and Will Smith's ban from the Academy Awards; Dulcé Sloan reacts to Ketanji Brown Jackson's Supreme Court confirmation; Ben Stiller on how the COVID pandemic affected the creation of Severance and working in both comedic and dramatic genres. NOTE: The Daily Show's first episode before a live audience, and first episode back at NEP Studio 52 in New York, since before the COVID-19 pandemic began in March 2020.
3664	April 12	Dawn Staley	South Carolina Gamecocks women's basketball
Trevor on the rise in inflation, Elon Musk's dance with Twitter's board of directors, Shanghai's COVID-19 lockdown, and a driverless car driving off from a police stop; "CP Time" (Roy Wood, Jr. on the history of Black classical musicians); Dawn Staley discusses coaching South Carolina to the NCAA women's basketball title and supporting other coaches of color.
3665	April 13	Jerrod Carmichael	Jerrod Carmichael: Rothaniel
Coverage of Texas' governor busing migrants to Washington, Rihanna posing her pregnant body for the cover of Vogue, and a Pennsylvania school policing snacks for students; Trevor has thoughts on a New York subway shooting incident.
3666	April 14	Rosie Perez	The Flight Attendant
Trevor on Elon Musk's offer to buy Twitter; "Jordan Klepper Fingers the Pulse" (Jordan reports from the CPAC convention in Orlando and learns why American conservatives find Hungary's authoritarian prime minister alluring); Rosie Perez discusses breaking Hollywood stereotypes.
3667	April 18	Janelle Monáe	The Memory Librarian: And Other Stories of Dirty Computer
Trevor on bans of math textbooks in Florida for citing critical race theory; "America: WTF?" (Ronny Chieng on tax season, tipping, and physical currency in the U.S.); Janelle Monáe on healing during the pandemic and her love of sci-fi.
3668	April 19	Pamela Adlon	Better Things
Thoughts on the end of COVID-related mask mandates for travelers; Jordan Klepper travels to Hungary to examine its Trump-like (and Trump-liking) political trajectory; Pamla Adlon on what she's learned as a single parent and guiding others to showbiz opportunities.
3669	April 20	Chris Smalls	Amazon Labor Union
Thoughts on Florida governor Ron DeSantis' beef with The Walt Disney Company; "Prove Me Wrong" (New Yorkers try to convince Ronny Chieng about the importance of Earth Day); Chris Smalls on what led to the formation of a union for Amazon's Staten Island workers.
3670	April 21	Alexander Skarsgård	The Northman
Trevor on Rudy Giuliani being revealed as a The Masked Singer contestant and the shutdown of CNN+; "Other Countries Have News, Too" (a look at the 2022 French presidential election); Alexander Skarsgård on creating a Viking movie and his family's Viking lineage.
3671	April 25	Gia Casey and RaaShaun "DJ Envy" Casey	Real Life, Real Love: Life Lessons on Joy, Pain & the Magic That Holds Us Together
Coverage of Elon Musk's acquisition of Twitter, lack of U.S. sanctions against Vladimir Putin's rumored girlfriend, and the controversy over the game show Old Enough!; Trevor goes in-depth on Republicans having “January 6th amnesia” (a segment that ends with a spoof of Severance); Gia and DJ Envy on overcoming marital infidelity and the need for men to discuss their relationships.
3672	April 26	Burna Boy	Burna Boy: One Night in Space
Thoughts on whether a Elon Musk-owned Twitter will reinstate Donald Trump, how helicopter parents are adversely affecting officials in youth sports, and a "procrastinator café" in Japan; the introduction of "TDS+++" ("All your favorite Daily Show personalities, stretched incredibly thin"); Burna Boy on producing Twice as Tall over Zoom, selling out Madison Square Garden, and having his mom as his manager.
3673	April 27	Terry Crews	Tough: My Journey to True Power
Trevor on Russia shutting off gas pipelines to Poland and Bulgaria, pay increases for Delta Air Lines' flight attendants, and Anthony Fauci declaring America's pandemic phase over; in a filmed skit, "Black Karen" (Dulcé Sloan) gives white people a sense of how Blacks feel when they call the cops on them; Terry Crews on growing up in an abusive houseold and the backlash over his "Black supremacy" comments on Twitter.
3674	April 28	Daniel Ricciardo	McLaren
Thoughts on abandoned U.S. military equipment falling into Taliban hands and Donald Trump's fear of being hit by "dangerous fruit"; "Fringe-Watching" (a profile of U.S. Rep. Madison Cawthorn and his scandalous behavior); Daniel Ricciardo has a "shoey" with Trevor and discusses the rise of Formula 1's popularity in the U.S. and preparing for the upcoming inaugural Miami Grand Prix.

=== May ===
No.		Guest(s)	Promotion
3675	May 2	Ziwe Fumudoh	Ziwe
Thoughts on NASA examining its litter on Mars and GOP Senate candidates in Ohio courting Donald Trump's favor; Ziwe on her brand of comedy and turning interviews into iconic moments.
3676	May 3	U.S. Senator Amy Klobuchar Bill Gates	Reproductive issues How to Prevent the Next Pandemic
Trevor examines the leaked early-draft decision on Dobbs v. Jackson Women's Health Organization, and interviews Senator Amy Klobuchar about the decision in particular and the threat against abortion rights in general; Bill Gates discusses reducing the risk of future pandemics and assuring fair access to technology.
3677	May 4	Alexis McGill Johnson	Planned Parenthood
A look at reaction to the leaked Dobbs decision, the return of old anti-abortion laws, and how companies are offering travel reimbursement for employees seeking abortion care; Michael Kosta challenges New Yorkers to "Guess the Speaker"; Planned Parenthood CEO Alexis McGill Johnson discusses abortion rights.
3678	May 5	Alex Burns and Jonathan Martin	This Will Not Pass: Trump, Biden, and the Battle for America's Future
Trevor on the Federal Reserve's interest rake hike, a crude video of U.S. Rep. Madison Cawthorn, and NASA's plan to entice alien contact with photos of nude humans; "CP Time" (Roy Wood, Jr. on the history of Black jockeys in thoroughbred racing); The New York Times' Alex Burns & Jonathan Martin on the crises that marked the Trump-to-Biden transition, and why Jared Kushner got involved in Kanye West's presidential run.
3679	May 12	Frances Noah	TBA
"A Tribute to My Gran," a full-episode salute to Trevor's beloved grandmother, the late Frances Noah.
3680	May 31	Kellyanne Conway	Here's the Deal: A Memoir
Trevor covers America's gun violence debate; Ronny Chieng celebrates Asian American and Pacific Islander Heritage Month.

=== June ===
No.		Guest(s)	Promotion
3681	June 1	U.S. Senator Chris Murphy Akwaeke Emezi	Gun politics in the United States Dear Senthuran; You Made a Fool of Death with Your Beauty
Thoughts on the U.S. sending missiles to Ukraine to aid its battle with Russia; Chris Murphy discusses seeking common ground on gun reforms post-Uvalde and how the once-powerful gun lobby has lost steam; Akwaeke Emezi talks about creating stories that combine love and grief, and penning 7 books in a 4-year span.
3682	June 2	Sergiy Kyslytsya	Russian invasion of Ukraine
Michael Kosta investigates the connection between mass shootings and doors, Ukraine's ambassador to the UN, Sergiy Kyslytsya, discusses why supporting Ukraine in its war with Russia is vital for the rest of the world.
3683	June 6	Bobby Brown	Bobby Brown: Every Little Step
"Votedemic 2022" (a look at the Los Angeles mayoral election); Bobby Brown discusses misconceptions about his life, the power of prayer and therapy, and being able to finally speak his truth.
3684	June 7	Eliot Schrefer	Queer Ducks (and Other Animals): The Natural World of Animal Sexuality
Thoughts on New York passing regulations on semi-automatic rifles; "Agree to Disagree with Roy Wood, Jr." (Roy sits down with Ammon Bundy); Eliot Schrefer discusses why scientists have hidden same-sex sexual behavior in nature.
3685	June 8	Iman Vellani	Ms. Marvel
A preview of the January 6 hearings; Roy Wood, Jr. on the gentrification of Brooklyn; Iman Vellani on playing a Muslim superhero and finding the casting call for Ms. Marvel through a WhatsApp message.
3686	June 9	Michael R. Jackson	A Strange Loop
A look at rising gas prices, gun control legislation in the House, and the drama surrounding the 9th Summit of the Americas; Trevor analyzes the tempestuousness of those facing criminal charges in the January 6 attack, while two Trump supporters (played by Michael Kosta and Desi Lydic) give their own version of "the talk"; Michael R. Jackson on creating A Strange Loop and connecting with theater audiences.
3687	June 13	Ayo Edebiri	The Bear
A look at new revelations from the January 6 hearings and the rebranding of McDonald's in Russia; Ayo Edebiri on changing careers (from teaching to showbiz) and whether The Bear is a comedy or a drama.
3688	June 14	Katie Couric	Going There
A look at Wall Street entering a bear market, a tampon shortage, and Kimberly Guilfoyle's big payday for a short speech on January 6; "The Daily Showography" ("Rudy Giuliani: Oozing Greatness"); Katie Couric discusses her memoir, her new podcast on abortion and reproductive rights, and being "the boss of me."
3689	June 15	Davido	"Stand Strong"
A check-in on 2022 midterm primaries, the UK government's refugee deportation plan, and Kim Kardashian's altering of a famous Marilyn Monroe dress; "Kosta Can Do It" (Michael Kosta tries to become the 7th member of P1Harmony); Davido discusses challenging himself to make different music and his favorite part about being an artist.
3690	June 16	Ed Helms	Rutherford Falls
A look at the FDA's approval of COVID-19 vaccines for kids; "Leo Deblin" offers an economical solution to the nationwide shortage of beach lifeguards; TDS alum Ed Helms discusses working with a Native American writing room on Rutherford Falls.
3691	June 21	Katy Tur	Rough Draft: A Memoir
Trevor examines the possibility that China's government could access user data on TikTok, and has harsh words over police inaction during the Robb Elementary School shooting; "Dul-Sayin'" (Dulcé Sloan on the commercialization of Pride Month); Katy Tur on her family's history in the breaking news business, and her reaction to one of her parents coming out as trans.
3692	June 22	Angela Garbes	Essential Labor: Mothering as Social Change
Trevor examines "gas tax holidays" and gun reforms passing the Senate; "Back in Black with Lewis Black" (the rising price of weddings); Angela Garbes on how all work is not possible without domestic care.
3693	June 23	Elliot Page	The Umbrella Academy
A look at the Supreme Court's decision allowing concealed carry firearms in New York State; "Jordan Klepper Fingers the Pulse" (Trump supporters share their thoughts on the January 6 hearings); Elliot Page on how The Umbrella Academy's storyline incorporates his gender transition.
3694	June 27	Draymond Green	The Draymond Green Show
Coverage of the Supreme Court's formal overturn of Roe v. Wade and subsequent reaction; Michael Kosta examines how men can take a "snip" toward supporting women's reproductive rights; Draymond Green discusses winning the NBA title with the Golden State Warriors.
3695	June 28	New York City Mayor Eric Adams	N/A
A look at Cassidy Hutchinson's testimony before the January 6 committee regarding Donald Trump's demeanor on the day of the riots; Eric Adams discusses his first 6 months as New York's mayor, his efforts to improve the city's education system, and why he thinks Rudy Giuliani reported a false crime in a slapping incident inside a Staten Island ShopRite.
3696	June 29	Van Lathan Jr.	Fat, Crazy, and Tired: Tales from the Trenches of Transformation
A look at plans by Sweden and Finland to become NATO member states; Desi Lydic examines the history of Pride Month; Van Lathan Jr. discusses his weight loss journey, the working environment at TMZ, and what he hopes to do with his career moving forward.
3697	June 30	Veronica Ivy Moses Ingram	Union Cycliste Internationale Obi-Wan Kenobi
A look at the Supreme Court decision that undermines EPA efforts to regulate greenhouse gas emissions; UCI track cycling champion Veronica Ivy discusses the debate over transgender people in sports; Moses Ingram recalls the lightsaber training and hairstyle choices for her Obi-Wan Kenobi character.

=== July ===
No.		Guest(s)	Promotion
3698	July 18	Terri Jackson	Women's National Basketball Players Association
Trevor on the European heat wave, the Biden/bin Salman meeting, and Joe Manchin balking over the Build Back Better Act; Dulcé Sloan tries to make New Yorkers late for work, WNBPA executive director Terri Jackson discusses Russia's detainment of Brittney Griner.
3699	July 19	Gregory L. Robinson	James Webb Space Telescope
Trevor analyzes the loss of January 6 texts by the Secret Service, the Dallas Independent School District requiring students' backpacks to be see-through, and how companies are keeping products cheaper by shrinking them; "Project: Conspiracy" ("Kevin Matthew Kelp" investigates tracking info on fruit stickers); Webb program director Gregory Robinson discusses the advancements of and images from the telescope.
3700	July 20	Jenny Slate	Marcel the Shell with Shoes On
Coverage of the House passing the Respect for Marriage Act and strategies by Democrats to boost Trump-backed candidates; "Dul-Sayin'" (Dulcé Sloan on gender stereotypes in children's books); Jenny Slate discusses the development of Marcel the Shell and telling kids stories for adults.
3701	July 21	Blitz Bazawule	The Scent of Burnt Flowers
Coverage of President Biden testing positive for COVID-19, Boris Johnson's last speech as British Prime Minister, and Amazon's purchase of One Medical; a recap of the January 6 hearings; Blitz Bazawule on how his grandmother's storytelling inspired his career as a filmmaker, artist, and writer.
3702	July 25	Daniel Kaluuya	Nope
Thoughts on mpox becoming a global health emergency; a sizzling U.S. heat wave, and a chess-playing robot breaking a kid's finger; an in-depth look at the eighth hearing of the January 6 committee; Daniel Kaluuya on building rapports with Nope director Jordan Peele & co-star Keke Palmer and his mother's reaction to his Oscars speech.
3703	July 26	Molly Burke Brian Cox	Disability rights movement Succession
Thoughts on Pope Francis apologizing for the Catholic Church's abuse of indigenous people; Molly Burke on using social media to create and advocate positive narratives around disabled people; Brian Cox on choosing to be optimistic and how he relates to his Succession character, Logan Roy.
3704	July 27	Rafael A. Mangual	Manhattan Institute for Policy Research; Criminal (In)Justice: What the Push for Decarceration and Depolicing Gets Wrong and Who It Hurts Most
A look at the controversy surrounding House Speaker Pelosi's planned trip to Taiwan and complaints about Instagram becoming more like TikTok; Ronny Chieng investigates the Greater Idaho movement.
3705	July 28	Leila Mottley	Nightcrawling
Trevor covers the release of Beyoncé's new album, what's being included in Grand Theft Auto VI, and whether the U.S. is entering a recession; an in-depth examination of Joe Manchin reaching an agreement with fellow Senate Democrats on the Inflation Reduction Act; Leila Mottley on depicting the nuances of Black girlhood and the inspiration behind her debut novel.

=== August ===
No.		Guest(s)	Promotion
3706	August 1	Pete Buttigieg	United States Department of Transportation
Thoughts on the Biden Administration's plan to close border wall gaps; "CP Time" (Roy Wood, Jr. on the origins of house music); Transportation Secretary Pete Buttigieg discusses U.S. infrastructure challenges.
3707	August 2	Alec Karakatsanis Ms. Pat	Usual Cruelty: The Complicity of Lawyers in the Criminal Injustice System The Ms. Pat Show
Trevor on House Speaker Nancy Pelosi's visit to Taiwan; Alec Karakatsanis on how the media perptuates the "copaganda" myth; Ms. Pat on creating comedy from darkness.
3708	August 3	Ryuji Chua	How Conscious Can A Fish Be?
"Votedemic 2022" (coverage of the latest primary elections and the upholding of abortion rights in Kansas); "Headlines" looks at the editing of new songs by Beyoncé and a legal error by Alex Jones; an examination on how student debt can impact borrowers into seniority; Ryuji Chua on seeing animals as living beings and not items.
3709	August 4	Amandla Stenberg	Bodies Bodies Bodies
"Ain't Nobody Got Time For That" (quick takes on various news including Russia's sentencing of Brittney Griner, Aaron Rodgers admitting to using psychedelic drugs, and scientists reanimating cells from dead pigs); "Fill Me In" (Michael Kosta challenges New Yorkers with fill-in-the-blank questions); Amandla Stenberg on finding comedy in horror and discovering algorithmic biases on social media.
3710	August 8	U.S. Senator Tim Scott Nathalie Emmanuel	America, a Redemption Story: Choosing Hope, Creating Unity The Invitation
Thoughts on a climate & health bill passing the U.S. Senate, a CPAC celebration of a January 6th rioter, and the combination of the HBO Max and Discovery+ streaming services; Tim Scott on not sidestepping the issue of race, where he places blame for January 6th, and helping his grandfather vote for Barack Obama; Nathalie Emmanuel on cutting her hair and how Americans and Brits differ expressively.
3711	August 9	Idris Elba	Beast; S'ABLE Labs
Trevor opines on the FBI's raid on Mar-A-Lago, and gauges the audience's advice on what he wants to post to social media; Idris Elba on facing off with a CGI-created lion and creating an inclusive skincare line with his wife.
3712	August 10	Akin Omotoso	Rise
Thoughts on Donald Trump invoking the 5th amendment during a deposition; "Jordan Klepper Fingers the Pulse" (Jordan visits a Trump rally in Wisconsin); Akin Omotoso on creating an authentic story about Giannis Antetokounmpo in Rise.
3713	August 11	Abbi Jacobson	A League of Their Own
"Ain't Nobody Got Time for That" (quick takes on Donald Trump's inner circle, a bounty on John Bolton, and a drop in Japan's birth rate); Ronny Chieng dares beachgoers to "Prove Me Wrong" about summer being the worst season; Abbi Jacobson on doing research for, and telling stories about queer and Black women in the 1940s in, A League of Their Own.
3714	August 15	Alex Wagner	Alex Wagner Tonight
Trevor on revelations that Donald Trump kept top-secret documents at Mar-a-Lago; Ronny Chieng heads to The Pentagon to learn about the United States Space Force.
3715	August 16	Sterling K. Brown	Honk for Jesus. Save Your Soul.
Trevor analyzes flash flooding in Las Vegas; William Shatner narrates "The Daily Showography" of "Elon Musk: Visionary FutureMan"; Sterling K. Brown discusses playing a megachurch pastor, working with Regina Hall, and wanting to stay in shape to play with his kids.
3716	August 17	John Boyega	Breaking
Trevor on Liz Cheney losing her House seat's primary in Wyoming and the rise of "quiet quitting" among Generation Z; "If You Don't Know, Now You Know" (the problematic history of bank overdraft fees).
3717	August 18	Harnaaz Sandhu	Miss Universe 2021
"Ain't Nobody Got Time for That" (coverage of the CDC's promise of a major overhaul, a guilty pleay by the Trump Organization's CFO, and Mariah Carey's "Queen of Christmas" trademark wish); Kerri Colby helps Dulcé Sloan critique the GOP's targeting of drag queens; Haranaaz Sandhu on her advocacy for menstrual equity.

=== September ===
No.		Guest(s)	Promotion
3718	September 6	Sherri Shepherd	Sherri
Coverage of a court-ordered halt in the review of materials pulled from the FBI search of Mar-a-Lago; Michael Kosta gets serious about small talk; Sherri Shepherd on moving back to New York City, giving stand-up comedians exposure, and running toward scary things.
3719	September 7	Edward Enninful	A Visible Man
Trevor on worries that the Russian invasion of Ukraine may go nuclear, the release of the iPhone 14, and the official White House portraits of Barack and Michelle Obama; Desi Lydic on the history of New York Fashion Week; British Vogue editor-in-chief Edward Enninful on fitting into an industry (fashion) in which he thought he (as a gay, Black man) didn't belong.
3720	September 8	Marty Walsh	United States Department of Labor
Coverage of the death of Britain's Queen Elizabeth; Desi Lydic "Fox-Splains" the FBI search of Mar-a-Lago; Labor Secretary Marty Walsh on the current U.S. labor market, and how American companies can learn from the training and treatment of workers in other countries.
3721	September 14	Jennette McCurdy	I'm Glad My Mom Died
Trevor on the aftermath of Queen Elizabeth's death and the petulance of Charles III; Jennette McCurdy on the message of her memoir, how troubles between child stars and controlling parents are commonplace, and returning to the entertainment industry.
3722	September 15	George Stephanopoulos	Power Trip
"Ain't Nobody Got Time For That" (thoughts on Patagonia's ownership transfer, migrants being transferred from Florida to Martha's Vineyard, and the casting of Halle Bailey in The Little Mermaid); "Fill Me In" (Michael Kosta challenges New Yorkers on trending quotes); George Stephanopoulos on changes in American political discourse and advising ABC News reporters to be transparent while covering the midterms.
3723	September 19	Sam Morril	Sam Morril: Same Time Tomorrow
A look at Queen Elizabeth's state funeral; "CP Time" (Roy Wood, Jr. on Black trailblazers in animation); Sam Morril on the importance of emotional detachment as a comedian.
3724	September 20	Jenifer Lewis	Walking in My Joy: In These Streets
A look at the vacating of Adnan Syed's conviction in the killing of Hae Min Lee; Trevor covers the reaction to Florida Governor Ron DeSantis sending migrants to Martha's Vineyard; Jenifer Lewis on receiving a star on the Hollywood Walk of Fame and working on her mental health.
3725	September 21	Beto O'Rourke	2022 Texas gubernatorial election We've Got to Try
A look at the surge of legal troubles facing Donald Trump; "We Don't Do That" (Dulcé Sloan meets up with the all-Black mountaineering group Team Full Circle); Texas gubernatorial candidate Beto O'Rourke on the need for not only immigration solutions (instead of stunts) but also dialogue across all political parties.
3726	September 22	Xolo Maridueña	Cobra Kai
Trevor examines protests in Iran, Vladimir Putin facing heat at home, and Donald Trump's claim he can declassify top-secret documents with his mind; Dulcé Sloan challenges passersby on the topic of education; Xolo Maridueña on staying "normal" while famous, his fight training for Cobra Kai, and landing the lead in Blue Beetle without an audition.
3727	September 26	Christiane Amanpour Tyler Perry	CNN A Jazzman's Blues
"Votedemic 2022" (coverage of Republican plans to eliminate 87,000 IRS jobs and a Congressional candidate in Ohio lying about his military service); "Headlines" coverage of Rihanna being tapped to perform at the Super Bowl, James Earl Jones retiring from voicing Darth Vader, and the plummeting value of the British pound; Christiane Amanpour on refusing to wear a headscarf when interviewing Iran's president; Tyler Perry on why he held on to the script for A Jazzman's Blues for 27 years, advised he received from August Wilson, and why he'll never leave Madea behind.
3728	September 27	William MacAskill	What We Owe the Future
A look at Russia coercing Ukrainians into voting in favor of joining the Russian Federation; Ronny Chieng teaches you about K-pop; William MacAskill on altruism, fighting climate change, and the "common sense" importance of helping future generations.
3729	September 28	Mark Cuban	Shark Tank; Cost Plus Drugs
"Headlines" coverage of Hurricane Ian slamming into Florida, a moribund verbal gaffe by Joe Biden, and weird sounds interrupting an American Airlines flight; "Project: Conspiracy" ("Kevin Matthew Kelp" on the "secret weapon" that is the ice cream truck); Mark Cuban on how having a competitive nature makes him a better businessman.
3730	September 29	Iman	Supreme Models
Iman on the legacy of Black supermodels breaking industry stereotypes; Trevor lets the audience know of his plans to depart The Daily Show, and reflects on the toxicity of online discourse.

=== October ===
No.		Guest(s)	Promotion
3731	October 3	Method Man	On the Come Up
"Vlad Gone Mad" (a look at Russia's illegal annexation of several Ukrainian regions); "Headlines" coverage of the collapsing NFT and cryptocurrency markets and a bass fishing tournament scandal; a look at The Right Stuff (a dating app for conservatives) leads to a promo for "HateF**k," which helps users with drastically diametric viewpoints "bang out their differences"; Method Man on his journey from music to acting and being true to himself.
3732	October 4	U.S. Representative Cori Bush	The Forerunner: A Story of Pain and Perseverance in America
Coverage of the aftermath of Hurricane Ian, protests in Iran, and Elon Musk deciding to purchase Twitter after all; "Fringe-Watching" (a profile of Georgia U.S. Senate candidate Herschel Walker); Cori Bush on how her experiences with poverty and protests inspires her work as a lawmaker.
3733	October 5	Maggie Haberman	Confidence Man: The Making of Donald Trump and the Breaking of America
Trevor discusses Aaron Judge breaking the American League's single-season home run record and criticism over House of the Dragon's dark tone; Ronny Chieng examines "ultimate pillow fighting"; Maggie Haberman on Donald Trump's obsession with media attention and the animosity between him and Florida Governor Ron DeSantis.
3734	October 6	Constance Wu	Making a Scene; Lyle, Lyle, Crocodile
"Ain't Nobody Got Time for That" (quick takes on rising oil prices, "rainbow fentanyl," President Biden issuing pardons for marijuana possession, and Elon Musk's plans for Twitter); "Votedemic 2022" (a look at claims that Georgia U.S. Senate candidate Herschel Walker paid for an abortion, along with a "Fox-planation" from Desi Lydic); Constance Wu on taking a break from Hollywood and why the Asian American community needs "whole human representation."
3735	October 11	Michael Fanone	Hold the Line: The Insurrection and One Cop's Battle for America's Soul
Trevor examines Tommy Tuberville's criticism of slavery reparations and offensive comments by Kanye West and Los Angeles City Council members in "The Amazing Racism"; "Vlad Gone Mad" (Trevor and Desi Lydic on Russian hackers attacking American airport websites); Michael Fanone recalls responding to the January 6 United States Capitol attack, and opines on lawmakers' attitudes toward that day and the failings of politicians and American law enforcement toward combating crime.
3736	October 12	John Gray, Pierre Serrao, and Lester Walker	Ghetto Gastro; Ghetto Gastro Presents Black Power Kitchen
"Votedemic 2022" (Trevor looks at health concerns surrounding Pennsylvania U.S. Senate candidate John Fetterman and the Los Angeles mayoral race); Desi Lydic examines potential election ballot shortages; The members of Ghetto Gastro on why they "break bread to build bridges."
3737	October 13	Quintessa Swindell	Black Adam
"Ain't Nobody Got Time for That" (quick takes on attempts to combat inflation, a legal verdict against Alex Jones, and the January 6 committee's subpoena of Donald Trump); a day in the life of "Judge Raymond Dearie," the special master appointed to review classified documents found in Mar-A-Lago; Quintessa Swindell on what it means to be a representation for nonbinary folks, and how playing Cyclone in Black Adam has contributed to their self-confidence.
3738	October 17	Chelsea Manning	README.txt
Trevor covers claims of financial fraudulence surrounding Truth Social, wild campaign claims by Herschel Walker, and SpaceX's support of Ukraine; "Dul-Sayin'" (Dulcé Sloan on the history of reggaeton music); Chelsea Manning on pulling off one the largest intelligence leaks in history.
3739	October 18	Soledad O'Brien Amy Schumer	The Rebellious Life Of Mrs. Rosa Parks Inside Amy Schumer
Trevor examines the wildest political ads of the campaign; Soledad O'Brien on making a feature-length documentary on Rosa Parks; Amy Schumer on embedding feminist lessons into her comedy.
3740	October 19	Brandi Carlile	In These Silent Days
"Headlines" coverage includes the NFL's Black Friday game plans, MacKenzie Scott's donation to the Girl Scouts, and the UFC's plans for Power Slap; Brandi Carlile on making In the Canyon Haze as a labor of love, defining success in music, and getting to perform with Joni Mitchell.
3741	October 20	Tyler James Williams	Abbott Elementary
Trevor on Liz Truss' quick exit as UK Prime Minister and research that reveals COVID-19 can make human organs age faster; Desi Lydic on legal marijuana sales in Florida gas stations; Tyler James Williams on the power of sitcoms, and how Abbott Elementary comments on the American educational system.
3742	October 24	John David Washington	The Piano Lesson
Trevor examines vandalizing art in the name of climate change activism, Xi Jinping's continued rule in China, and Rishi Sunak's pending ascension to the prime minsitership in Great Britain; "Jordan Klepper Fingers the Pulse" (how Americans feel about a second Civil War).
3743	October 25	Mira Murati Ralph Macchio	OpenAI Waxing On: The Karate Kid and Me
"Fringe-Watching" (a profile of Arizona gubernatorial candidate Kari Lake); OpenAI Chief Technology Officer Mira Murati discusses the DALL-E text-to-image model; Ralph Macchio on The Karate Kid's impact on his life.
3744	October 26	Elizabeth Banks	Call Jane
"Votedemic 2022" (a look at the John Fetterman/Mehmet Oz debate for Pennsylvania's Senate seat); Desi Lydic on the origins of Halloween; Elizabeth Banks on how Call Jane both chronicles the Jane Collective and destigmatizes women who seek abortion care.
3745	October 27	Diane Kruger	A Name from the Sky
"Headlines" include Rihanna's plans to release new music, Elon Musk's near-complete takeover of Twitter, and whether Russia and Ukraine may set off dirty bombs against each other; "Prove Me Wrong" (Ronny Chieng tells New Yorkers his negative thoughts on Halloween); Diane Kruger on writing a children's book, supporting her daughter's growth, and acting in three different languages.
3746	October 31	Stacey Abrams	2022 Georgia gubernatorial election
"The Daily Show Undesked", from Atlanta; Michael Kosta explores Atlanta spots that "the guide books won't tell you about"; Stacey Abrams on how voting access "is the responsibility of the government."

=== November ===
No.		Guest(s)	Promotion
3747	November 1	T-Pain	Nappy Boy Entertainment
"The Daily Show Undesked", from Atlanta; A look at Elon Musk's rocky takeover of Twitter; Dulcé Sloan examines the richness of Atlanta's Black culture.
3748	November 2	U.S. Senator Rev. Raphael Warnock	2022 United States Senate election in Georgia
"The Daily Show Undesked", from Atlanta; Trevor examines false statements expressed in campaign attack ads; Roy Wood, Jr. tries to create a hip-hop hit to encourage going to the polls.
3749	November 3	Dominique Wilkins	KultureCity
"The Daily Show Undesked", from Atlanta; A look at Barack Obama's campaigning for Democratic candidates; Desi Lydic and Roy Wood, Jr. see if Georgia voters can overcome legal obstacles in "Georgia Ninja Voter"; Dominique Wilkins discusses how Atlanta became his home, and how the NBA has changed since his playing days.
3750	November 7	Gabriel Iglesias	Gabriel Iglesias: Stadium Fluffy
Trevor recaps Oprah Winfrey's endorsement of John Fetterman and other late developments in the lead-up to Election Day in "Votedemic 2022"; Desi Lydic on the shortage of poll workers.
3751	November 8	Thuso Mbedu	The Woman King
"Votegasm 2022" (Trevor and the correspondents cover Election Day); "CP Time" (Roy Wood, Jr. examines the history of Black governors in the U.S.); Thuso Mbedu on pursuing acting from a social impact standpoint, and working with Viola Davis in The Woman King.
3752	November 9	Mark Leibovich	Thank You for Your Servitude: Donald Trump's Washington and the Price of Submission
Trevor recaps the 2022 midterm election and the lack of a supposed "red wave"; Roy Wood, Jr. reacts to Louisiana's refusal to ban slavery; Mark Leibovich discusses how Republicans continue to embolden and enable Donald Trump.
3753	November 10	Jordan Peele	Wendell & Wild; Quiet Part Loud
Trevor on Colorado's vote to legalize psychedelic mushrooms, Sean Penn loaning Volodymyr Zelenskyy his Academy Award, and Twitter's "blue check" fiasco; Ronny Chieng explores the history of Asian-American veterans.
3754	November 14	Nas	King's Disease III
A look at Democrats reclaiming a U.S. Senate majority; "CP Time" (Roy Wood, Jr. on the history of Black superheroes in comics and film).
3755	November 15	Danai Gurira	Black Panther: Wakanda Forever
A look at Kari Lake's questioning of the results in the Arizona governor's race; "Back in Black with Lewis Black" (Lewis rails against young people acting like old people).
3756	November 16	Jonathan Majors	Devotion
Trevor on Donald Trump launching his 2024 presidential bid; Desi Lydic on the history of Black Friday.
3757	November 17	Barack Obama	Obama Foundation
A look at Nancy Pelosi ceding her leadership role for the House Democrats; Barack Obama discusses the 2022 midterms and the challenges that democracy faces around the world and here at home.
3758	November 28	Will Smith	Emancipation
Trevor on Donald Trump's dinner with Kanye West and a white supremacist, as well as the 2022 FIFA World Cup; Will Smith on playing an enslaved man in Emancipation, and why he calls the film a "freedom movie" rather than a "slave movie."
3759	November 29	Pam Grier	The Plot Thickens
Trevor covers efforts to prevent a rail strike; Michael Kosta examines the niche market of haunted dolls; Pam Grier on sharing her life story for the podcast The Plot Thickens.
3760	November 30	Ondi Timoner Gabrielle Union	Last Flight Home The Inspection
A look at the upcoming runoff for the 2022 United States Senate election in Georgia; Ondi Timoner discusses filming her father Eli's final days; Gabrielle Union on breaking out creatively with her role in The Inspection.

=== December ===
No.		Guest(s)	Promotion	U.S. viewers (millions)
3761	December 1	Maryland Governor-elect Wes Moore	N/A	0.731
Trevor on Hakeem Jeffries becoming the first Black party leader in Congress; Desi Lydic examines the intimidation of election officials; Wes Moore on his approach to campaigning for governor of Maryland.
3762	December 5	Tressie McMillan Cottom	The New York Times; University of North Carolina at Chapel Hill	0.450
An AI chatbot goes viral; "Dul-Sayin'" (Dulcé Sloan explores the history of drag queens); UNC-Chapel Hill associate professor Tressie McMillan Cottom discusses Twitter's role in public discourse.
3763	December 6	Michael Strahan Sheryl Lee Ralph	American Football: How the Gridiron was Forged Abbott Elementary; Sleigh	0.437
Trevor examines the rise of wage theft in the U.S.; Michael Strahan on what he misses most about playing football, and what he learned about the sport while producing the American Football podcast; Sheryl Lee Ralph discusses staying motivated as an actor, and her Christmas album, Sleigh.
3764	December 7	Roger Federer	N/A	0.436
At look at Sen. Raphael Warnock's win in the Georgia runoff election; Desi Lydic and Michael Kosta star in an election-denier holiday romantic comedy; Roger Federer discusses his tennis career.
3765	December 8	Neal Brennan	Neal Brennan: Blocks	0.443
Trevor Noah’s final episode as host of The Daily Show sees the correspondents offer him their best wishes; "Jordan Klepper Fingers the Pulse" (New Yorkers offer their own thoughts on Trevor's departure); Neal Brennan gives Trevor flowers and a stack of paperwork (to sign up for COBRA coverage); Trevor tells the audience of the lessons he's learned as host, and recollects getting the call from Jon Stewart to join the show; "Your Moment of Zen" (the staff and audience serenade Trevor with "You'll Never Walk Alone").
