= Big Game James =

Big Game James is a nickname that may refer to the people:

- James Worthy (born 1961), American former professional basketball player
- James Shields (baseball) (born 1981), American former professional baseball player
- James Yap (born 1982), Filipino professional basketball player

== See also ==
- Big Game (disambiguation)
