= List of The Daily Show episodes (2021) =

Episodes of American satirical news series

- No. of episodes: 115

Release
- Original network: Comedy Central
- Original release: January 19 – December 16, 2021

Season chronology
- ← Previous; 2020 episodes Next → 2022 episodes

This is a list of episodes for The Daily Show with Trevor Noah, Comedy Central's satirical news series, during 2021.

Due to the COVID-19 pandemic, Noah continued filming episodes from his home, titled The Daily Social Distancing Show with Trevor Noah. After the last home-based show on June 18 and a summer hiatus, the series returned to the studio on September 13, setting up shop at One Astor Plaza, the Times Square headquarters of Comedy Central parent ViacomCBS.

== 2021 ==
=== January ===
No.	Original air date	Guest(s)	Promotion	U.S. viewers (millions)
3516	January 19	Carey Mulligan	Promising Young Woman	0.733
The Daily Social Distancing Show; Trevor covers preparations in Washington, D.C. for Joe Biden's inauguration, and looks at the January 6 attack, its aftermath and reactions, and the legacy of Donald Trump's presidency; Desi Lydic looks back on Jared Kushner and Ivanka Trump's White House roles; Carey Mulligan discusses tackling the topic of sexual assault through comedy.
3517	January 20	Stacey Abrams	N/A	0.752
The Daily Social Distancing Show; Joe Biden is officially sworn in as the 46th president of the United States of America; "If You Don't Know, Now You Know" (Trevor dives into the history of Inauguration Day); Stacey Abrams discusses her grassroots political efforts in Georgia.
3518	January 21	Jelani Cobb	The New Yorker	0.674
The Daily Social Distancing Show; President Biden exceeds America's low expectations; Desi Lydic looks back at Melania Trump's defining moments as First Lady; Jelani Cobb discusses what led to and what comes after the Trump presidency.
3519	January 25	Nnamdi Asomugha	Sylvie's Love	0.632
The Daily Social Distancing Show; Thoughts on Republicans resisting Donald Trump's second impeachment trial; Roy Wood Jr. examines an alternative to traditional policing in Oregon; Nnamdi Asomugha discusses transitioning from football to acting, and learning to play the saxophone for his film role in Sylvie's Love.
3520	January 26	Stanley Nelson Jr.	Crack: Cocaine, Corruption & Conspiracy	0.760
The Daily Social Distancing Show; A look at the messy rollout of the COVID-19 vaccine in the U.S.; Trevor examines Donald Trump's breakup with Fox News; Stanley Nelson talks of his firsthand experiences in Harlem during the crack cocaine epidemic.
3521	January 27	Amanda Gorman	"The Hill We Climb"	0.682
The Daily Social Distancing Show; Trevor covers international coronavirus news and divergent demands for unity from President Biden and Republicans; Amanda Gorman discusses her historic inaugural poem, and what poetry means to her.
3522	January 28	Doug Henwood Regina King	Behind the News One Night in Miami...	0.726
The Daily Social Distancing Show; Doug Henwood weighs in on the GameStop stock surge; Roy Wood, Jr. talks to African political scholars about America's democratic crisis; Regina King discusses her directorial debut and being a role model for Black women in Hollywood.

=== February ===
No.	Original air date	Guest(s)	Promotion	U.S. viewers (millions)
3523	February 1	Jeremy O. Harris	Slave Play	0.690
The Daily Social Distancing Show; Trevor discusses Redditors driving up the price of silver, while Desi Lydic endorses a different investment opportunity, kiwis; "Fringe-Watching" (a look at Rep. Marjorie Taylor Greene's embrace of racist and conspiratorial theories); Jeremy O. Harris discusses writing Slave Play, how growing up Black in the South inspired his work, and financial support for the theater industry.
3524	February 2	Ibram X. Kendi	How to Be an Antiracist; Four Hundred Souls: A Community History of African America 1619–2019	0.706
The Daily Social Distancing Show; Trevor analyzes Rep. Alexandria Ocasio-Cortez's recounting of her Capitol riot experience, and highlights Wall Street's long history of manipulating stock prices; Ibram X. Kendi on the importance of anti-racism, compiling the history of Black America, and his hopes for the Biden administration.
3525	February 3	Dax Shepard	Top Gear America; Armchair Expert	0.608
The Daily Social Distancing Show; Trevor explores America's longstanding childcare crisis; Desi Lydic offers rehab services to entitled "Karens"; Dax Shepard talks about filming Top Gear America and learning new and different subjects for his Armchair Expert podcast.
3526	February 4	U.S. Representative Cori Bush	N/A	0.707
The Daily Social Distancing Show; A look at House Democrats stripping Rep. Marjorie Taylor Greene of her committee assignments; Rep. Cori Bush on standing up to Greene, COVID-19 relief funds, and "out of touch" colleagues in Congress; "Sports Bomb" (Roy Wood, Jr. and Michael Kosta preview Super Bowl LV).
3527	February 8	Dr. Atul Gawande Leonard Fournette	The New Yorker Tampa Bay Buccaneers	0.651
The Daily Social Distancing Show; Thoughts on Conservative pundits heaping scorn on President Biden; Dr. Atul Gawande discusses America's COVID-19 challenges; Leonard Fournette on winning Super Bowl LV, playing with Tom Brady, and his hopes for the future.
3528	February 9	Robin Roberts Noah Centineo	Good Morning America; Tuskegee Airmen: Legacy of Courage To All the Boys: Always and Forever	0.689
The Daily Social Distancing Show; Trevor examines the massive farmer protest in India; Robin Roberts discusses Super Bowl LV, returning to the Good Morning America studio, and how her father inspired her to produce a documentary on the Tuskegee Airmen; Noah Centineo on playing Peter Kavinsky in the To All the Boys trilogy and navigating social media as an actor.
3529	February 10	Radha Blank	The 40-Year-Old Version	0.693
The Daily Social Distancing Show; A look at the performance of and criticism against Donald Trump's lawyers during Trump's impeachment trial; "CP Time" (Roy Wood, Jr. on the history of Black Americans in the world of espionage); Radha Blank discusses writing and directing The Forty-Year-Old Version and keeping a persevering mindset while facing theatrical rejections.
3530	February 11	Daniel Kaluuya	Judas and the Black Messiah	0.658
The Daily Social Distancing Show; Trevor covers the third day of Donald Trump's impeachment trial; "Jordan Klepper Fingers the Pulse" (in Washington, D.C., Jordan gathers thoughts on the impeachment trial from Trump supporters, Democratic senators, and District residents); Daniel Kaluuya on playing Fred Hampton in Judas and the Black Messiah and the international history of the Black Panthers.
3531	February 15	Neil Patrick Harris	It's A Sin	0.632
The Daily Social Distancing Show; Trevor discusses the second impeachment acquittal of Donald Trump and new COVID-19 variants found in America; The Daily Show's correspondents talk about their year under COVID lockdown; Neil Patrick Harris discusses perfecting a British accent, and how It's a Sin seeks to educate people about the AIDS epidemic in the United Kingdom.
3532	February 16	Bill Gates	How to Avoid a Climate Disaster: The Solutions We Have and the Breakthroughs We Need	0.611
The Daily Social Distancing Show; Ronny Chieng shares ways to combat the rise in anti-Asian hate crimes; "CP Time" (Roy Wood, Jr. on the history of Black doctors); Bill Gates discusses how government and average citizens can reduce carbon emissions.
3533	February 17	Heather McGhee	The Sum of Us: What Racism Costs Everyone and How We Can Prosper Together	0.570
The Daily Social Distancing Show; Texans suffer from ongoing extreme winter weather; members of "the Divine Nine" talk with Dulcé Sloan about seeing fellow Black sorority alum Kamala Harris become Vice President; Heather McGhee on the economic impact of racism in the United States, and the importance of having honest conversations about past and present racism.
3534	February 18	Russell Westbrook	Washington Wizards; Why Not? Foundation	0.685
The Daily Social Distancing Show; Parents and kids grow impatient about reopening schools; "The Daily Showography" (a profile of Tucker Carlson); Russell Westbrook on his pre-game fashion choices, documenting the Tulsa race massacre, and uplifting the Black community through philanthropy.
3535	February 22	Sharon McMahon	SharonSaysSo Instagram account	0.694
The Daily Social Distancing Show; A look at the continuing winter storm crisis in Texas; Michael Kosta on vote-rigging in New Zealand's Bird of the Year competition; Sharon McMahon on the distinctions separating facts from conspiracies and biases from lies.
3536	February 23	Hugh Evans	Global Citizen	0.617
The Daily Social Distancing Show; Republican lawmakers in several states go on an anti-voting blitz; "CP Time" (Roy Wood, Jr. celebrates the contributions of Black journalists); Hugh Evans discusses Global Citizen's "Recovery Plan for the World."
3537	February 24	Andra Day	The United States vs. Billie Holiday	0.648
The Daily Social Distancing Show; Trevor highlights racial inequity in vaccine distribution, "Dul-Sayin'" (Dulcé Sloan examines the stereotype of the strong Black woman and its history and harmfulness); Andra Day discusses getting into character as Billie Holiday, and how filming Holiday's tale took a toll on her.
3538	February 25	Kevin Garnett	KG: A to Z: An Uncensored Encyclopedia of Life, Basketball, and Everything in Between	0.685
The Daily Social Distancing Show; Trevor discusses the TikTok trend of showing off regrettable tattoos, while Desi Lydic shares her own embarrassing body art; "If You Don't Know, Now You Know" (Trevor examines America's outdated and extremely vulnerable power grid); Kevin Garnett on turning a learning disorder into a positive, and how an incident in his teens almost derailed his Hall of Fame career.

=== March ===
No.	Original air date	Guest(s)	Promotion	U.S. viewers (millions)
3539	March 1	Marlee Matlin	Feeling Through	0.703
The Daily Social Distancing Show "Ain't Nobody Got Time For That" (Trevor covers CPAC 2021); "Property Brothas" Roy Wood, Jr. and Jaboukie Young-White have ideas on how to replace the Atlantic City's Trump Plaza Hotel and Casino after its demolition; Marlee Matlin discusses showcasing deaf/blind actors.
3540	March 2	U.S. Rep. Adam Kinzinger H.E.R.	United States House of Representatives "Fight for You"	0.608
The Daily Social Distancing Show; Rep. Madison Cawthorn faces sexual harassment allegations; Rep. Adam Kinzinger discusses COVID relief, standing up to Donald Trump, and the future of the GOP; H.E.R. talks about performing under a pseudonym, remaining anonymous, and staying connected during the pandemic.
3541	March 3	Kelly Marie Tran	Raya and the Last Dragon	0.482
The Daily Social Distancing Show; Trevor laments states lifting COVID restrictions, and examines rumors of a second attack on the U.S. Capitol; "Let's Get Fiscal" (Trevor looks at the state of minimum wage in the U.S); a promo for "Leo Deblin Streaming++" ("Just FaceTime me and I'll hold my phone up to the TV"); Kelly Marie Tran discusses becoming a Disney Princess and setting healthy social media boundaries.
3542	March 4	Michael Kiwanuka	Kiwanuka	0.611
The Daily Social Distancing Show; A look at COVID vaccines being administered to apes, and Republicans' efforts to delay COVID relief funds; "Joe Biden: The Worst President in History That We Can Remember" looks at Fox News' slamming of Biden for numerous pseudo-scandals; "If You Don't Know, Now You Know" (Trevor explores the history of America's first ladies); Michael Kiwanuka talks about his parents' support of his music, and performs "Rolling" from his old high school.
Special	March 10	NCT 127	N/A	0.487
The Daily Show with Trevor Noah Presents: Remotely Educational; In this special that premiered during a daytime slot (and was rebroadcast that night at the show's normal time) Trevor and TDS' correspondents offer "lessons that students will actually need in life," with topics including "divorce arithmetic" from Michael Kosta, lying on the internet from Ronny Chieng, a course on "who hates who" by Roy Wood, Jr., career guidance from Lewis Black, and reading subtitles from K-pop band NCT 127.
3543	March 15	Eddie Murphy	Coming 2 America	0.663
The Daily Social Distancing Show; A look at the mounting harassment scandal facing New York governor Andrew Cuomo; Jaboukie Young-White discusses COVID-19 vaccines with Dr. Peter Hotez; Eddie Murphy offers thoughts on Coming 2 America and returning to stand-up comedy.
3544	March 16	Rebecca Carroll Precious Lee	Surviving the White Gaze: A Memoir Run the World	0.578
The Daily Social Distancing Show; Thoughts on efforts by former presidents Jimmy Carter, Bill Clinton, George W. Bush, and Barack Obama to convince Americans to get COVID-19 vaccinations; Rebecca Carroll on transracial adoption and forging her own Black identity; Precious Lee talks about her trailblazing modeling career and venturing into acting.
3545	March 17	Cynthia Erivo	Genius: Aretha	0.598
The Daily Social Distancing Show; Trevor covers the discovery of ancient biblical passages and the development of the "Zoom Escaper" tool; "If You Don't Know, Now You Know" (the history of the Senate filibuster); Trevor shares criticisms on a mass shooting in the Atlanta area that claimed the lives of several Asian women ("We could see this coming"), as well as law enforcement's remarks about the shooter; Cynthia Ervio discusses playing Aretha Franklin, mimicking the singer's voice, and maintaining her mental health during the pandemic; "Your Moment of Zen" (local anchors act all Irish on Saint Patrick's Day).
3546	March 18	Arsenio Hall	Coming 2 America	0.527
The Daily Social Distancing Show; Trevor reports on COVID-19 concerns from around the world; Michael Kosta and Roy Wood, Jr. introduce the "Bracket of Bulls**t: Pandemic Edition"; Arsenio Hall discusses working again with Eddie Murphy and breaking late-night barriers.
3547	March 22	Michelle Obama	Waffles + Mochi; Pass the Love	0.564
The Daily Social Distancing Show; Trevor and Michael Kosta spoof the British royal family's plans to hire a diversity chief; a look at gender discrimination claims against the NCAA; former First Lady Michelle Obama on encouraging healthy eating and providing meals to families in need.
3548	March 23	Eric Andre	Bad Trip	0.526
The Daily Social Distancing Show; Trevor covers heartwarming news during the pandemic; Desi Lydic explores the "Hist-HER-y" of on-screen female orgasms; comedian Eric Andre talks about his hidden-camera prank-based movie Bad Trip and his family's affinity for Trevor.
3549	March 24	Nomzamo Mbatha	Coming 2 America	0.554
The Daily Social Distancing Show; Trevor examines the all-encompassing scourge of violence against women; "Dul-Sayin'" (Dulcé Sloan celebrates activist women athletes); Nomzamo Mbatha talks about landing her role in Coming 2 America, living in Los Angeles, and receiving her O-1 visa.

=== April ===
No.	Original air date	Guest(s)	Promotion	U.S. viewers (millions)
3550	April 5	Carl L. Hart	Drug Use for Grown-Ups: Chasing Liberty in the Land of Fear	0.515
The Daily Social Distancing Show; Trevor highlights a fourth wave of COVID and voter suppression in Georgia; Desi Lydic examines how the pandemic disproportionately harms working women; Dr. Carl L. Hart discusses misconceptions surrounding drugs and those who use them.
3551	April 6	Garrett Bradley Morgan Freeman	Time Creative Coalition	0.500
The Daily Social Distancing Show; Trevor on the controversy over vaccine passports; Garrett Bradley discusses confronting systemic problems with incarceration; Morgan Freeman talks about the Creative Coalition's "Be There, This Is Your Shot" PSA.
3552	April 7	Danielle Brooks	Robin Roberts Presents: Mahalia	0.446
The Daily Social Distancing Show; Trevor explores the rise of NFTs; Michael Kosta and Roy Wood, Jr. announce the winner of the "2020 Bracket of Bulls**t"; Danielle Brooks on portraying Mahalia Jackson, taking pride in her singing voice, and becoming a mother.
3553	April 8	Lee Isaac Chung	Minari	0.635
The Daily Social Distancing Show; In the wake of a "double mutant" coronavirus being discovered, a PSA parody offers reasons to not get the COVID vaccine; "Culture Wars: Moral Kombat" (Trevor on diversity efforts by United Airlines and conservative lawmakers' efforts to ban trans students from competing in sports); Desi Lydic "Fox-splains" Georgia's controversial voting law; Lee Isaac Chung discusses how Minari humanizes Asian-Americans.
3554	April 12	Miguel	Art Dealer Chic Vol. 4	0.534
The Daily Social Distancing Show; Trevor on traffic stops by police that resulted in actions both lethal (the killing of an unarmed Black man in Minnesota) and harmful (the pepper spraying of a Black U.S. Army lieutenant in Virginia); Dulcé Sloan examines an effort to remove slurs from Scrabble's word list; Miguel on expressing himself in his new album and why he cares about mental health.
3555	April 13	Katherine Maher Travon Free	Wikimedia Foundation Two Distant Strangers	0.553
The Daily Social Distancing Show "Please Allow Me to Introduce Yourself" (Trevor examines the powerful position of West Virginia Senator Joe Manchin), Katherine Maher discusses the mission of Wikipedia and its addressing of gender and racial disparities; Travon Free on how Two Distant Strangers addresses systemic problems with police.
3556	April 14	Elizabeth Nyamayaro Issa Rae	I Am a Girl from Africa; HeForShe Campaign Life Unseen	0.440
The Daily Social Distancing Show; Trevor covers plans for U.S. forces to withdraw from Afghanistan, discusses problems with policing in America, and remarks on advanced warnings U.S. Capitol Police leaders downplayed prior to January 6; Elizabeth Nyamayaro discusses wanting to work at the United Nations; Issa Rae on giving underrepresented creators an audience.
3557	April 15	Skye Fitzgerald	Hunger Ward	0.583
The Daily Social Distancing Show "A Ray of Sunshine" finds Trevor poking fun at such lighthearted and uplifting stories as Canada's Summer Olympics uniform and Walt Disney World updating its employee dress code; Michael Kosta makes like Mike Lindell an ad for "My Vaccine, the vaccine for conservatives"; Trevor examines the dangers of driving while Black; Skye Fitzgerald discusses documenting the famine in Yemen.
Special	April 19	N/A	N/A	0.492
The Daily Show with Trevor Noah Presents: Jordan Klepper Fingers the Pulse - Into the MAGA-Verse; Jordan Klepper revisits his surreal year on the 2020 campaign through archived & unseen footage and follow-up interviews.
3558	April 26	Vic Mensa	I Tape	0.563
The Daily Social Distancing Show; Trevor recaps the Oscars, an explosion in New Hampshire related to a gender reveal party, and how a Bumble match led to a January 6 insurrectionist's arrest; a look at the latest COVID news in "Keeping Up with Corona"; an ad for "The Probable Magic Kingdom, where nothing gets cancelled"; "Thank Me Later" (Michael Kosta takes a close look at the U.S.'s measurement unit of feet); Vic Mensa talks about the inspirations for is new album and the problem of incarceration in America.
3559	April 27	Tarana Burke & Brene Brown	You Are Your Best Thing: Vulnerability, Shame Resilience, and the Black Experience	0.514
The Daily Social Distancing Show; Trevor looks at the results of the U.S. census, Rick Santorum's disparaging comments toward Native Americans, and new COVID guidance from the CDC; Dulcé Sloan gives unsung female rappers their due in "Dul-Sayin'"; Tarana Burke and Dr. Brene Brown discuss helping the Black community confront trauma.
3560	April 28	Anthony Mackie	The Falcon and the Winter Soldier	0.497
The Daily Social Distancing Show; Headline coverage includes COVID vaccine incentives and how Citizen Kane lost its "greatest movie ever" title; "Joe Biden: The Worst President in History That We Can Remember" (a look at Fox News pundits making wild myths about the president); Roy Wood, Jr. delivers his annual "State of Black S**t Address; Anthony Mackie discusses playing Captain America.
3561	April 29	U.S. Senator Mazie Hirono George Lopez	Heart of Fire: An Immigrant Daughter's Story Walking with Herb	0.400
The Daily Social Distancing Show; Roy Wood, Jr. on plans by the FDA to ban menthol-flavored cigarettes; Trevor examines Joe Biden unveling a major agenda in his first speech to Congress as president; Sen. Mazie K. Hirono discusses dealing with Ted Cruz & Mitch McConnell and dedicating her memoir to her mother; George Lopez on learning acting and his experience with the Secret Service over a joke.

=== May ===
No.	Original air date	Guest(s)	Promotion	U.S. viewers (millions)
3562	May 3	Michael B. Jordan	Without Remorse	0.458
The Daily Social Distancing Show; Trevor on COVID vaccine hesitancy, the return of live music, and engagement rings for men; "If You Don't Know, Now You Know" (why Apple's iPhone privacy updates is rankling Facebook); "CP Time" (Roy Wood, Jr. highlights the history of Black royals); Michael B. Jordan on playing John Clark, doing his own stunts, and planning his directorial debut.
3563	May 4	U.S. Senator Elizabeth Warren	Persist	0.550
The Daily Social Distancing Show; Trevor serves up some uplifting news for the pandemic era; "The Daily Showography" of "Ted Cruz: "The Booger on the Lip of Democracy"; Senator Elizabeth Warren discusses writing honestly about her 2020 presidential bid and the importance of Democrats following through on campaign promises.
3564	May 5	Selma van de Perre	My Name Is Selma: The Remarkable Memoir of a Jewish Resistance Fighter and Ravensbrück Survivor	0.470
The Daily Social Distancing Show; Trevor covers a debate over teaching about racism in U.S. schools; Jaboukie Young-White gives tips on adjusting to post-pandemic life; Selma van de Perre discusses surviving the Ravensbrück concentration camp and her experiences during the Nazi Holocaust.
3565	May 6	Alex Gibney Sara Bareilles	The Crime of the Century Girls5eva; Amidst the Chaos: Live from the Hollywood Bowl	0.540
The Daily Social Distancing Show; Trevor opines on Twitter's plans to make their platform more civil and how a Belgian farmer inadvertently shifted the border with France; Desi Lydic shares her pandemic-era Mother's Day wish; a look at GOP backlash against Liz Cheney and another election audit in Arizona; Alex Gibney discusses making a documentary about the opiod crisis in the U.S.; Sara Bareilles on how she relates to her Girls5Eva character and performing at the Hollywood Bowl.
3566	May 10	Ian Manuel Candace Parker	My Time Will Come: A Memoir of Crime, Punishment, Hope, and Redemption Chicago Sky	0.540
The Daily Social Distancing Show; Trevor examines California Gov. Gavin Newsom facing a wild recall race; Ian Manuel discusses turning to poetry to cope with a prison sentence and why young offenders deserve a second chance; Candace Parker talks about her return to Chicago.
3567	May 11	J Balvin	The Boy from Medellin	0.495
The Daily Social Distancing Show; Trevor discusses corruption and diversity issues within the Hollywood Foreign Press Association and examines the escalating Israel-Palestine conflict; Michael Kosta talks to New Yorkers about their city's mayoral race; J Balvin on wanting to show Colombia in a positive light and his struggles with mental health.
3568	May 12	Michelle Zauner	Japanese Breakfast; Crying in H Mart	N/A
The Daily Social Distancing Show; How members of Donald Trump's family got personal with Secret Service agents; "Fringe-Watching" (Trevor highlights the ouster of Rep. Liz Cheney from, and the addition of Elise Stefanik to, House GOP leadership); an ad for "Insurrectigone," the drug that gives Republicans relief from guilt over January 6; "Jordan Klepper Fingers the Pulse" of the Arizona election audit; Michelle Zauner on her Korean heritage and processing her mother's death.
3569	May 13	Frank Luntz Thuso Mbedu	n/a The Underground Railroad	N/A
The Daily Social Distancing Show; Thoughts on why Elon Musk is forbidding Tesla purchases with bitcoin and Ohio's $1 million COVID vaccine lottery; "If You Don't Know, Now You Know" (how ransomware is becoming a growing threat in the U.S.); Frank Luntz discusses how the right messaging can get people vaccinated and elevate political discourse; Thuso Mbedu on breaking into American TV and getting into character.
3570	May 17	Sharon Stone	The Beauty of Living Twice	N/A
The Daily Social Distancing Show; A look at Joe Biden's Venmo account, a former Navy pilot's claim that his squadron frequently saw UFOs, and new capital punishment methods in South Carolina; how the CDC's change in COVID-19 mask guidelines created an uproar; Ronny Chieng learns about the value of NFTs; Sharon Stone discusses surviving a near-death experience, the power of her Basic Instinct role, coping with childhood trauma, and working to fight mother-to-child HIV transmission.
3571	May 18	Salima Koroma	Dreamland	N/A
The Daily Social Distancing Show; How restaurants are having trouble hiring new employees; "CP Time" (Roy Wood, Jr. highlights the history of Black leaders in America's labor movement); Salima Koroma discusses the lingering effects of the Tulsa race massacre and what made the neighborhood it took place in so special.
3572	May 19	Barry Jenkins Logan Paul	The Underground Railroad Mayweather vs. Paul	N/A
The Daily Social Distancing Show; A video from the "New York State Governor's Office Sexual Harassment Center"; a look into plans for and pushback against an investigation into the Capitol insurrection, and how rioters from that day are bragging their way into arrest; Barry Jenkins on tackling painful subjects on film; Logan Paul on his journey into boxing and the good and bad sides of his YouTube success.
3573	May 20	Jeremy Lin	#MentalHealthAction	N/A
The Daily Social Distancing Show; A look at the cicada reemergence and a potential "spermageddon" facing the human race; how Zoom and photo filters have created a dysmorphia crisis; Roy Wood, Jr. talks to attorney Steven Donziger about his battle with Chevron; Jeremy Lin discusses his mental health advocacy and the next generation of Asian-American basketball players.

=== June ===
No.	Original air date	Guest(s)	Promotion
3574	June 7	Indya Moore	Pose
The Daily Social Distancing Show "So Much News" looks at Jeff Bezos' plans for "shipping himself into space," Joe Manchin breaking from Democrats on voting rights, and Nigeria blocking Twitter access; why the coronavirus vaccination rate in the U.S. is hitting a snag; "Remotely Educational" (Ronny Chieng gives a lecture on shady creative writing for the internet); Indya Moore on the positive response to Pose and teaming up with Tommy Hilfiger on a fashion project.
3575	June 8	Gina Yashere Chris Bosh	Cack-Handed: A Memoir; Bob Hearts Abishola Letters to a Young Athlete
The Daily Social Distancing Show; Thoughts on the Bitcoin cryptocurrency facing bad times; Gina Yashere on coming out to her Christian Nigerian mom and getting discovered by Chuck Lorre; Chris Bosh discusses processing his NBA retirement through writing.
3576	June 9	Yvonne Orji	Bamboozled By Jesus: How God Tricked Me into the Life of My Dreams; Insecure
The Daily Social Distancing Show; Trevor looks at how the wealthiest Americans are paying the lowest amount of taxes, as well as the controversy over a Black Lives Matter section in a Florida high school's yearbook; "If You Don't Know, Now You Know" (Trevor examines America's crumbling water infrastructure); "I Apologize For Talking While You Were Talking" (Michael Kosta and Roy Wood, Jr. discuss Naomi Osaka withdrawing from the 2021 French Open, the Mayweather vs. Paul fight, and LeBron James' early exit from the NBA Playoffs); Yvonne Orji on how faith guides her and wrapping up production on Insecure.
3577	June 10	Nick "Nickmercs" Kolcheff Anthony Ramos	FaZe Clan In the Heights; Love and Lies
The Daily Social Distancing Show; Trevor on the Joe Biden/Boris Johnson meeting and the National Geographic Society recognizing a 5th ocean; "Return to Normal-ish" (Trevor discusses how people are behaving badly as they emerge from COVID lockdown); an ad for "Throwdown Air" ("Once the wheels are up, the shit goes down!"); Nick Kolcheff on making the cover of Sports Illustrated and the future of gaming; Anthony Ramos discusses making In the Heights and the importance of onscreen representation.
3578	June 14	Kareem Abdul-Jabbar	Fight the Power: The Movements That Changed America
The Daily Social Distancing Show; World leaders welcome President Biden to the G7 summit with open arms; Ronny Chieng dissects America's outrage addiction; Kareem Abdul-Jabbar discusses using sports as a racial equality platform.
3579	June 15	Christian Pulisic Lin-Manuel Miranda	United States men's national soccer team In the Heights: Finding Home
The Daily Social Distancing Show; Thoughts on Girl Scout Cookies going unsold and Marjorie Taylor Greene apologizing for comparing COVID restrictions to The Holocaust; "Let's Talk This Out" (thoughts on cyberbullying in general and Chrissy Teigen apologizing for her Twitter behavior in particular); Christian Pulisic talks about recent wins on the pitch and passing down his love of soccer to kids; Lin-Manuel Miranda discusses the importance of people feeling seen.
3580	June 16	Ashley C. Ford Sam Jay	Somebody's Daughter: A Memoir PAUSE with Sam Jay
The Daily Social Distancing Show; Trevor discusses Joe Biden's European trip ("Grandpa's Day Out") and Juneteenth finally becoming a federal holiday; "If You Don't Know, Now You Know" (a look at the history of racial discrimination against Black farmers); Ashley C. Ford on healing from trauma caused by her parents; Sam Jay discusses having honest conversations and the meaning of her HBO show's title.
3581	June 17	Mary J. Blige	Mary J. Blige's My Life
The Daily Social Distancing Show; Trevor on the summer heat wave and NASA developing an asteroid-hunting telescope; "If You Don't Know, Now You Know" (Trevor explores the impact of streaming on the music industry, and has Aloe Blacc remix a song to reflect how little artists profit from streaming); "Jordan Klepper Fingers the Pulse" (Jordan attends the MAGA Frank Rally in New Richmond, Wisconsin and talks to organizer Mike Lindell); Mary J. Blige discusses documenting her sophomore album, healing from pain, and what hip hop means to her.

=== September ===
No.	Original air date	Guest(s)	Promotion
3582	September 13	Anthony Fauci	National Institute of Allergy and Infectious Diseases
Trevor and The Daily Show return to the studio to cover the 20th anniversary commemorations of 9/11 and the Biden administration's announcement of a major vaccination mandate; Roy Wood, Jr. worries about the latest COVID variant; NIAID director and "Corona fighter-in-chief" Anthony Fauci discusses vaccine misinformation and the need for vaccine mandates.
3583	September 14	Gabrielle Union	You Got Anything Stronger?
Trevor has thoughts on Nicki Minaj's concerns about the COVID vaccine; "Count on It" (Dulcé Sloan examines the decrease in sperm volume); Gabrielle Union on sharing her personal experiences through published essays; "Your Moment of Zen" (a tribute to Norm Macdonald).
3584	September 15	Carmelo Anthony	Los Angeles Lakers; Where Tomorrows Aren't Promised: A Memoir of Survival and Hope
A look at revelations that Instagram adversely affects teens' mental health and U.S. forces incorrectly targeted civilians in Afghanistan drone strikes; Desi Lydic examines the "Hist-HER-y" of childbirth; Carmelo Anthony discusses joining the Lakers and writing about a life of overcoming adversity.
3585	September 16	Terrence Deyalsingh LeVar Burton	Trinidad & Tobago Ministry of Health LeVar Burton Reads podcast
Anderson .Paak hits the drums to back Trevor's analysis on a school bus driver shortage in the U.S.; ongoing coverage of whether the COVID vaccine contributed to "Nicki Minaj's cousin's friend's swollen testicles," including an interview with Trinidadian health minister Terrence Deyalsingh; Desi Lydic "Fox-Splains" the Biden administration's COVID vaccine mandate; LeVar Burton discusses his lifelong love of reading and the chance to be a Jeopardy! host.
3586	September 20	Aly Raisman	Aly Raisman: Darkness to Light
Trevor discusses efforts to protect ancient sequoia trees from the California wildfires and the Taliban taking advantage of equipment U.S. forces left behind; how the COVID pandemic is leading to burnout among the nursing profession; Trevor announces nominees for "The 2nd Annual Pandemmys"; Aly Raisman discusses advocating for sexual abuse survivors and the importance of self-compassion.
3587	September 21	U.S. Representative Pete Aguilar	N/A
Trevor reflects on COVID becoming the deadliest health pandemic in U.S. history and San Francisco's mayor flouting her own mask rules; why the #DeviousLicks TikTok challenge is leading to school vandalism; a look at a cancelled submarine deal between Australia and France; Dulcé Sloan tries to make New Yorkers late for work with small talk; Pete Aguilar discusses the House Select Committee's investigation into Donald Trump's role in January 6.
3588	September 22	Greta Thunberg	School Strike for Climate
Why New Zealanders are rebelling against new COVID lockdowns and Facebook is emphasizing positive stories about itself on users' news feeds; a look at the wide-ranging effects of climate change; Michael Kosta explores how California farmers are turning to "water witches" to ease drought effects; Greta Thunberg discusses why climate change needs to be treated as a crisis.
3589	September 23	Jason Isbell	Georgia Blue
Jason Isbell helps Trevor break down an Oregon company's plan to build a windowless airplane, and later discusses his new covers album and pushing for a safe return to live performances; a look at the growing issue with, and misinformation surrounding, migrants approaching and crossing the U.S. border; "Jordan Klepper Fingers the Pulse" (Jordan examines parents in North Carolina protesting vaccine/mask mandates and critical race theory curricula in schools).
3590	September 27	Neal Brennan	Neal Brennan: Unacceptable
Trevor on Instagram's plans to create a kids-only app; Michael Kosta "underexplains" the importance of getting COVID booster shots; a look at Congressional efforts to guarantee a woman's right to abortion access; in the wake of a Texas law requiring "The Star Spangled Banner" be played at athletic events, "Francis Scott Key, Jr." breaks down his famous work; Neal Brennan discusses returning to the Off-Broadway stage and his use of ayahuasca.
3591	September 28	Davido	A Better Time
Trevor and Dulcé Sloan on China's restrictions against cryptocurrency and kids' use of social media; Roy Wood, Jr. spotlights the history of Black fashion models in "CP Time"; Davido discusses becoming a worldwide success and how one of his songs became a protest anthem; "Your Moment of Zen" (Minnesota gubernatorial candidate Scott Jensen recalls his mother's "Scotch Tape test" for pinworm infection).
3592	September 29	Derecka Purnell	Becoming Abolitionists: Police, Protests, and the Pursuit of Freedom
Trevor on the Amazon Astro and the global rate of animal extinction; "Keeping Up with the Congressians" (Trevor riffs on Congressional efforts to fund the government); an ad for "Manchin, the politics game where everyone works together... almost"; Dulcé Sloan and Roy Wood, Jr. discuss why news of missing white women gets so much media attention; Derecka Purnell discusses the movement to abolish police departments.
3593	September 30	Jake Gyllenhaal	The Guilty
Trevor examines evidence that COVID vaccine incentives are working, the emancipation of Britney Spears, and a fuel shortage in the United Kingdom; how issues with shipping delays and microchip shortages are leading to a head start on holiday shopping; "I Apologize For Talking While You Were Talking" (Michael Kosta and Roy Wood, Jr. analyze Justin Tucker's record-breaking field goal, the Cleveland Indians pending name change, and vaccine hesitancy among NBA players); Jake Gyllenhaal discusses making The Guilty in the wake of the murder of George Floyd.

=== October ===
No.		Guest(s)	Promotion
3594	October 4	Richard Antoine White	I'm Possible: A Story of Survival, a Tuba, and the Small Miracle of a Big Dream
Trevor goes in-depth on the Pandora Papers leak; "Prove Me Wrong" (Dulcé Sloan challenges New Yorkers on various topics including pizza, golf, and reality TV); Richard Antoine White discusses how taking up the tuba shaped his life.
3595	October 5	Tristan Harris	Center for Humane Technology
"Red, White, and Broken" (Trevor discusses how some are claiming religious reasons to refuse vaccine mandates); "Thank Me Later" (Michael Kosta speaks with Jessica Pin, who fought to have detailed descriptions of the clitoris included in medical textbooks); Tristan Harris discusses Facebook's harmful business model and how technology can improve democracy.
3596	October 6	Monica Lewinsky	15 Minutes of Shame
A look at libraries forgiving overdue fees and a Virginia man directing racial slurs at his Black neighbors; "Disagree to Agree" (Trevor brings on "Trey" and "Trevarious" to present opposing thoughts on the Biden administration's spending bill); "Remotely Educational" (a film about "how Hollywood works"); Monica Lewinsky discusses being the "patient zero" of online public shaming and reclaiming her narrative step by step.
3597	October 7	Logic	This Bright Future: A Memoir
"Headlines" coverage of former NBA players defrauding the league's health and welfare plan, younger mobsters not learning old-school ways, and a data breach at Twitch; "If You Don't Know, Now You Know" (the right to repair movement); Desi Lydic "salutes" Fox News on its 25th anniversary; Ronny Chieng reluctantly discusses the popularity of autumn seasonal items; Logic discusses opening up about his tumultuous childhood.
3598	October 12	Phoebe Robinson	Please Don't Sit on My Bed in Your Outside Clothes; Tiny Reparations Books
Trevor and a buzzer-sounding Dulcé Sloan discuss Jon Gruden's dismissal from the Las Vegas Raiders, a California law outlawing non-consensual condom removal, and Squid Game's popularization of white shoes; "Vaccination Nation" (the resistance against COVID vaccines and vaccine mandates); Michael Kosta talks to a New Jersey woman fighting to display political banners bearing vulgar language; Phoebe Robinson on her collection of essays and representing new authors.
3599	October 13	Rosario Dawson	Dopesick
Trevor and an interrupting Ronny Chieng ("I was just looking for a book for the commute home") analyze William Shatner's adventure into "real space," North Korea's latest military parade, and Colorado park rangers removing a tire from an elk's neck; a look at efforts to alleviate effects of the megadrought in the Southwest; "Back in Black" (Lewis Black discusses Hollywood's desire to de-age actors on-screen); Rosario Dawson on her personal connections with the opioid crisis depicted in Dopesick and starting a made-in-Africa clothing line; "Your Moment of Zen" (news anchors use the "Beam me up, Scotty" line when discussing Shatner's space trip).
3600	October 14	John Legend	HUMANLEVEL
While Michael Kosta intrudes by using the studio wi-fi, Trevor analyzes Bali's desire to attract only "quality tourists" (and not backpackers) and why self-driving cars in San Francisco are attracted to a dead end street; "Getting Back to Normal-ish" (a look at the Great Resignation); Trevor opines on applying offensive words to certain groups (in the wak of Demi Lovato stating "alien" shouldn't be used to describe extraterrestrials); John Legend discusses becoming an activist and fighting for marginalized communities.
3601	October 18	Eve	Queens
While Roy Wood, Jr. chows down on a Popeyes sandwich, Trevor discusses a Texas school's mandate to teach "both sides" of the Holocaust, China's test of a hypersonic missile, and Christchurch ending its contract with The Wizard of New Zealand; Trevor gossips on Congressional Democrats' efforts (or lack thereof) to pass bills dealing with infrastructure and climate change in "Keeping Up with the Congressians"; "Jordan Klepper Fingers the Pulse" (Trevor covers a Donald Trump rally in Iowa); Eve talks having a baby and what attracted her to Queens.
3602	October 19	Alex Wagner	The Circus
Desi Lydic joins Trevor for "Headlines" coverage of which COVID booster vaccine is more effective, Hooters reversing course on waitresses' shorter shorts, and Kanye West just going by "Ye"; "Labor Pains" explores workers' demands during Striketober; "Dul-Sayin'" (Dulcé Sloan discusses the effects of fewer trees in lower-income neighborhoods); Alex Wagner discusses the state of the Republican Party and America's political divide.
3603	October 20	Nick Offerman	Where the Deer and the Antelope Play: The Pastoral Observations of One Ignorant American Who Loves to Walk Outside
Dulcé Sloan joins Trevor in covering the name change of Facebook's parent company and the successful transplant of a pig kidney into a human; "Vaccination Nation" looks at resistance by New York's and Chicago's police unions against vaccine mandates; "The Daily Showography" of "Vladimir Putin: Democracy's SuperTsar (in partnership with the Russian Federation Ministry of Communication)"; Nick Offerman talks about celebrating the great outdoors and bringing nuance back to human communication.
3604	October 21	U.S. Senator Tammy Duckworth Michael Pollan	Subminimum wages This Is Your Mind on Plants
"Headlines" coverage of Donald Trump's new social media plans and a failed effort in the Senate to pass voting rights protections; Trevor discusses legal loopholes allowing employers to pay disabled workers subminimum wages in "If You Don't Know, Now You Know," which is followed by an interview on the subject with Senator Tammy Duckworth; "Fill Me In" (Michael Kosta challenges what New Yorkers know about the news); Michael Pollan discusses the benefits of psychedelics on mental health.
3605	October 25	Anna Kendrick	Love Life
Trevor opines with Ronny Chieng on contaminated medical gloves from Thailand and the evolution of elephants, and looks at a tragic film set shooting incident involving Alec Baldwin; "Please Allow Me to Introduce Yourself" (a profile of Arizona Senator Kyrsten Sinema); Anna Kendrick discusses how personal relationships influenced Love Life.
3606	October 26	Tamron Hall	Tamron Hall; As the Wicked Watch: The First Jordan Manning Novel
In between Roy Wood, Jr's plugs for his mythical show after Charlamagne tha God's, Trevor analyzes the revelation that Facebook prioritizes anger in its user feeds, an ad in the Virginia governor's race highlighting a mother's effort to remove Beloved from her teen's school library, and a California man's claim that he saved money on groceries by buying a year-round Six Flags pass; "If You Don't Know, Now You Know" examines why cops are pulling over drivers to meet quota demands, which leads into an ad for "Uber Blue" ("You have the right to remain comfortable"); Tamron Hall discusses filming her talk show from home and how covering stories about missing children led to writing a novel.
3607	October 27	Diego Boneta	Luis Miguel: The Series
Trevor and Dulcé Sloan examine warnings of edibles being distributed as Halloween candy, a proposal by Congressional Democrats to raise corporate taxes, and the rise in sales of tobacco products during the pandemic; Desi Lydic examines the use of vigilantes to restrict abortion access in Texas; Diego Boneta discusses getting to know, and learning to sing like, Luis Miguel.
3608	October 28	Kristen Soltis Anderson	The Selfie Vote: Where Millennials Are Leading America (And How Republicans Can Keep Up)
Trevor and Desi Lydic analyze what's left of the Biden spending plan and plans to issue passports with gender-neutral markers; "I Apologize For Talking While You Were Talking" (Roy Wood, Jr. and Ronny Chieng analyze the World Series and the early weeks of the NBA Season); Kristin Soltis Anderson on what Democrats don't understand about Republicans, why GOP voters find Donald Trump appealing.

=== November ===
No.		Guest(s)	Promotion
3609	November 1	U.S. Representative Dan Crenshaw	Fortitude: American Resilience in the Era of Outrage
"Grandpa's Day Out" (Trevor and Michael Kosta look at President Biden's meeting with Pope Francis and other events on his European trip); "CP Time" (Roy Wood, Jr. examines the history of Black horror movies); Dan Crenshaw discusses his issues with critical race theory and ideas to solve the illegal immigration problem; "Your Moment of Zen" (local anchors dress up for Halloween).
3610	November 2	Vanessa Nakate	A Bigger Picture: My Fight to Bring a New African Voice to the Climate Crisis
Trevor analyzes Supreme Court hearings on anti-abortion bounties in Texas, the Squid Game cryptocurrency scam, and a leaky toilet on the SpaceX capsule; Desi Lydic examines the influence of Swifties on Virginia's gubernatorial election; "Court Court" finds Desi and Roy Wood, Jr. arguing over ongoing legal news before Judge Trevor; Vanessa Nakate discusses the effects of climate change on Africa and being an activist in Uganda.
3611	November 3	U.S. Representative Katie Porter Lenard McKelvey (Charlamagne tha God)	Bankruptcy in the United States Tha God's Honest Truth
Trevor analyzes campaign losses by police reform advocates in Minnesota and Democrats in Virginia ("The Red Wedding"); Trevor and Katie Porter discuss bankruptcy actions used by Johnson & Johnson and other businesses to elude legal and financial troubles; Charlmagne tha God discusses embracing his name, his openness about mental health, and what Democrats are facing in the next election.
3612	November 8	Spike Lee	SPIKE
Trevor and Michael Kosta analyze rising sea levels swallowing island nations, Elon Musk taking stock advice from Twitter users, and Joe Biden passing wind in front of British royalty; a COVID news recap examines the U.S. allowing vaccinated visitors and Aaron Rogers contracting the disease; Trevor and "Independent Thinking Bird" discuss Ted Cruz's gripe about Big Bird getting the shot; Spike Lee discusses documenting his long career and giving his younger self advice.
3613	November 9	Emily Ratajkowski	My Body
Trevor and Ronny Chieng discuss the war on early Christmas music, Singapore's plans to not cover COVID treatment for unvaccinated patients, GOP lawmakers being threatened after voting for an infrastructure bill, and Josh Hawley's making declining masculinity a political issue; an ad for "Grand Theft Minivan, the [video] game that teaches you to be a responsible husband and father"; "Black Monomyth" (Dulcé Sloan visits Black beekeepers on a honey farm); Emily Ratajkowski discusses exploring the meaning of empowerment in her new essay collection and her experience shooting the "Blurred Lines" music video.
3614	November 10	Bad Bunny	Narcos: Mexico
Trevor and a paper towel-hording Roy Wood, Jr. discuss headlines including rising inflation numbers, a violent animation shared by Congressman Paul Gosar, and Portugal forbidding employers from contacting off-the-clock employees; an "Almost Veterans Day" salute to those who want everyone to think they actually served in the military; Bad Bunny on his rise in music, staying true to himself, and his acting debut; "Your Moment of Zen" (news anchors gripe over Paul Rudd being named People's "Sexiest Man Alive").
3615	November 11	Will Smith	King Richard; Will
Trevor on YouTube hiding "dislike" counts and Chris Christie's desire for the GOP to move on from 2020 election falsehoods; "Keeping Up with Corona" (U.S. plans to send COVID vaccines to international conflict zones and the virus' presence in deer); Ronny Chieng on the COVID-related shortage of department store Santas; Desi Lydic celebrates the "Hist-HER-y" of America's female veterans; Will Smith on portraying Richard Williams and the cathartic experience of writing his memoir; "Your Moment of Zen" (Newsmax's Eric Bolling challenges The Muppets to a debate).
3616	November 15	Chris Christie	Republican Rescue: Saving the Party from Truth Deniers, Conspiracy Theorists, and the Dangerous Policies of Joe Biden
Trevor discusses Donald Trump being "gangster" about his demanding that Mike Pence overturn the electoral vote on January 6; "Getting Back to Normal-Ish" (how decreased supply, and not increased demand, is driving up gas prices); a Biden Administration PSA promises to bring gas prices down by creating a new viral pandemic; "Leo Deblin's ICU 2 U" brings the intensive care unit experience to your home (since hospital ICUs are running out of space); Chris Christie discusses the need for Republicans to "return to truth" and whether he may run against Donald Trump in 2024.
3617	November 16	Ai Weiwei	1000 Years of Joys and Sorrows: A Memoir
Trevor and Dulcé Sloan analyze partisan preferences over the flu shot, a Russian missile test creating space debris, and a defense attorney's objections to Black pastors in the gallery at the Ahmaud Arbery murder trial; a "PSA" from "Drunks for Drunk Driving" objects to regulations requiring anti-drunk driving technology in new cars; "Prove Me Wrong" (Ronny Chieng challenges New Yorkers' thoughts on Thanksgiving); Ai Weiwei discusses the problems with Communist China and how writing his memoir led him to better understand his father.
3618	November 17	Dwyane Wade	Dwyane
Desi Lydic joins Trevor to analyze the renaming of Los Angeles' Staples Center and a Swiftie's threat against John Mayer; "Fringe-Watching" (a profile of Arizona Representative Paul Gosar); "Dul-Sayin'" (Dulcé Sloan on how HBCU marching bands became so popular); Dwyane Wade discusses raising a trans daughter and shifting the culture in the NBA.
3619	November 18	Halle Berry	Bruised
Trevor analyzes world news updates including a potential Russian invasion of Ukraine, the Belarusian president using weaponizing migrants, and China's disappearance of Peng Shuai; Desi Lydic offers tips for celebrating Thanksgiving on a budget; Halle Berry discusses making her directorial debut, doing her own stunts, and bring a Black woman perspective to starring roles; "Your Moment of Zen" (Newsmax's Eric Bolling vents over Sesame Street introducing an Asian-American Muppet).
3620	November 29	Peter Hotez Thandiwe Newton	Texas Children's Hospital Center for Vaccine Development; National School of Tropical Medicine at Baylor College of Medicine; Preventing the Next Pandemic: Vaccine Diplomacy in a Time of Anti-science President
Trevor and Roy Wood, Jr. cover the Omicron variant of COVID, and efforts to counter it, in "Keeping Up with the Coronavirus"; Dr. Peter Hoetz discusses Omicron, the need for vaccines, and how travel restrictions harm Southern African nations; Thandiwe Newton discusses President's showcasing of the fight for democracy in Zimbabwe.
3621	November 30	Natalie & Derrica Wilson	Black and Missing Foundation; Black and Missing
Trevor and Michael Kosta analyze vaccine effectiveness against Omicron, Barbados becoming a republic, and North Korea banning leather coats (to forbid citizens from dressing like Kim Jong-un); "The Pan-dumbic" (how Omicron is sparking a fresh round of conspiracy theories); Natalie & Derrica Wilson discuss the marginalization of missing Black persons by law enforcement and the media.

=== December ===
No.		Guest(s)	Promotion
3622	December 1	Ryan Busse Scottie Pippen	Gunfight: My Battle Against the Industry that Radicalized America Unguarded
Thoughts on CNN's suspension of Chris Cuomo, Donald Trump concealing his COVID-19 positive test before debating Joe Biden, and oral arguments at the Supreme Court in Dobbs v. Jackson Women's Health Organization; Ryan Busse on how the gun culture has changed America and why he believes the NRA is dangerous; Scottie Pippen on telling his life story from childhood to the NBA.
3623	December 2	William Jackson Harper	Love Life
Trevor on the spread of Omicron in the U.S. and the Major League Baseball players lockout; "If You Don't Know, Now You Know" (the career of outgoing German chancellor Angela Merkel); Desi Lydic highlights the year's celebrity power couples, and actor William Jackson Harper discusses producing and starring in Love Life and finding success after The Good Place.
3624	December 6	Mahershala Ali	Swan Song
A look at the U.S. government's diplomatic boycott of the Beijing Olympics; Ronny Chieng breaks down "the year in Texas"; Mahershala Ali on the fulfillment in producing and starring in Swan Song, and how his family is part of his success.
3625	December 7	California governor Gavin Newsom	Ben and Emma's Big Hit
Trevor examines America's soaring house prices; Roy Wood, Jr. hosts a New York City bus tour for K-pop group Aespa; Gavin Newsom discusses writing a children's book, California's actions regarding the pandemic, and a humanist approach to combating crime.
3626	December 8	Nikole Hannah-Jones	The 1619 Project: A New Origin Story
"Fringe-Watching" (a profile of Rep. Lauren Boebert); Jordan Klepper talks to vaccine-hesitant protesters in California; Nikole Hannah-Jones discusses the necessity of slavery reparations, and clears up misconceptions about The 1619 Project and critical race theory.
3627	December 9	José Andrés Lou Llobell	World Central Kitchen Foundation
Trevor on Boris Johnson violating Britain's COVID lockdown restrictions and Hillary Clinton revealing the victory speech she never gave in 2016; Chef José Andrés discusses solutions to food insecurity and helping the food service industry survive during the pandemic; Dulcé Sloan on the most memorable exits of 2021; Lou Llobell on what it means to play a genius who's a woman of color on Foundation.
3628	December 13	Huma Abedin	Both/And: A Life in Many Worlds
A look at Governor Gavin Newsom's modeling a California gun reform law after a Texas anti-abortion law; Roy Wood, Jr. highlights the cancellations of 2021; Huma Abedin on having her American patriotism questioned while in government.
3629	December 14	Chelsea Handler	Vaccinated and Horny Tour
A look at Congress holding former White House Chief of Staff Mark Meadows in contempt; Michael Kosta on the biggest scams of 2021; Chelsea Handler on falling in love with a fellow comic and beating out Trevor for a People's Choice Award.
3630	December 15	Jodie Turner-Smith	Anne Boleyn
A look at the surge of COVID-19 cases in pro sports and former governor Andrew Cuomo being ordered to pay book profits back to the state of New York; Dulcé Sloan breaks down the history of Kwanzaa; Jodie Turner-Smith on the response to her playing Anne Boleyn, and why the second wife of King Henry VIII is a complicated character to play.
3631	December 16	Bruno Le Maire	Ministry of Economics and Finance (France)
"If You Don't Know, Now You Know" (Trevor offers an analysis on China's investments in Africa); Desi Lydic and Michael Kosta play two people "finding love in a CRT world" in the trailer for "A School Board Christmas"; French Finance Minister Bruno Le Maire on divisiveness in France's presidential campaign, and potential consequences for Russia if they invade Ukraine.
