= The Great Game (disambiguation) =

The Great Game was the political and diplomatic confrontation that existed during the 19th century between Britain and Russia.

The Great Game may also refer to:

== Literature ==
- The Great Game (Peter Hopkirk book), a 1992 history book about Central Asia
- The Great Game (Gordon book), a 1999 finance book by John Steele Gordon
- A Great Game, a 2013 sports history book, by Stephen Harper, about Canadian ice hockey
- The Great Game, an autobiography of Leopold Trepper, a communist spy during World War II
- The Great Game in Cuba: CIA and the Cuban Revolution, a 2016 non-fiction book by Joan Mellen

== Film ==
- The Great Game (1930 film), a British film directed by Jack Raymond
- The Great Game (1953 film), a British film directed by Maurice Elvey
- The Great Game (1997 film), the original title of Frozen, a Chinese film directed by Wang Xiaoshuai
- The Great Game (2015 film), a French film directed by Nicolas Pariser
- "The Great Game" (Sherlock), an episode of Sherlock

== Other uses ==
- The Great Game: Afghanistan, a 2009 series of British plays on the history of Afghanistan
- Great Getaway Game, a 1990–1991 game show
- Sherlockian game or the Great Game, the pastime of attempting to resolve anomalies and clarify implied details about Sherlock Holmes
- The Great Gamble, a 2009 book about the Soviet-Afghan war

== See also ==
- Big Game (disambiguation)
- Scarlet Traces: The Great Game, a 2006 steampunk comic book
- Spycraft: The Great Game, a 1996 computer game
