= Big Game =

Big Game or The Big Game may refer to:

== Sports ==
- Big Game (American football), the annual American football game between Stanford University and the University of California, Berkeley
- James Worthy, also known as "Big Game" James, basketball player
- "The Big Game", a common euphemism for the Super Bowl, whose name is a trademark of the National Football League
- Big Game (poker), the most famous high-stakes mixed-game poker table in Las Vegas, hosted in "Bobby's Room" at the Bellagio
- The Big Game (rugby union), an annual rugby union match hosted by Harlequin F.C.
- Big Game (horse), a British thoroughbred racehorse

== Animal related ==
- Game (hunting), animals hunted for food and/or sport
- Big–game hunting, a form of recreational hunting
- Big-game fishing, a form of recreational fishing

== Entertainment ==
- The Big Game, now Mega Millions, a U.S. multi-jurisdictional lottery game
- Big Game (album), the third album by the heavy metal band White Lion
- Big Game TV, a live phone-in quiz channel
- Big Game, a 1921 film, American silent melodrama, directed by Dallas M. Fitzgerald
- The Big Game (1936 film), a sports drama film
- The Big Game (1942 film), a German sports film
- The Big Game (1973 film), a film directed by Robert Day
- Big Game (2014 film), a film starring Samuel L. Jackson
- Big Game (upcoming film), a Spanish thriller film
- The Big Game (American game show), which aired only in 1958
- The Big Game (Australian game show)
- PokerStars Big Game, a televised poker show which began airing in 2010
- The Big Game (Cartoon Network), an animated special that aired annually on Cartoon Network from 1998 to 2001
- The Big Game (Modern Family), an episode of the American TV sitcom

== Literature ==
- Big Game (short story), a short story by Isaac Asimov
- Big Game, a mystery novel by Stuart Gibbs
- Big Game (comics), a comic book limited series by Mark Millar
- Big Game: The NFL in Dangerous Times, a 2018 book by Mark Leibovich

== See also ==
- The Great Game (disambiguation)
