= Mark Leibovich =

American journalist and author (born 1965)

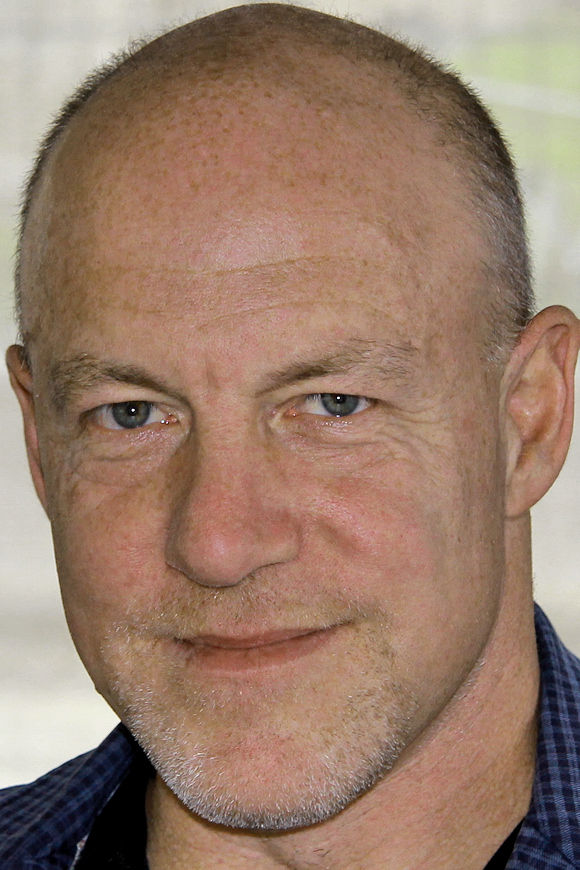
- Leibovich at the 2013 Texas Book Festival
- Born: May 9, 1965 (age 61); Boston, Massachusetts, US
- Education: Newton South High School
- Alma mater: University of Michigan (BA)
- Occupation: Journalist
- Children: 3
- Writing career
- Genre: Non-fiction

Mark Leibovich (/ˈliːbəvɪtʃ/ LEE-bə-vitch; born May 9, 1965) is an American journalist and author. He is a staff writer at The Atlantic, and previously spent 16 years at The New York Times, including a decade as the chief national correspondent for The New York Times Magazine, based in Washington, D.C. He is known for his profiles of political, sports, and entertainment figures.

In addition to his magazine and newspaper career, Leibovich has also written five books, including three New York Times bestsellers, and two number 1 Times bestsellers about the culture of Washington, D.C.: This Town and Thank You for Your Servitude.

== Early life and education ==
Born in Boston, Massachusetts to a father who was from Argentina and a Brooklyn-born mother, Leibovich grew up in a Jewish home he describes as not religious.

Leibovich attended Newton South High School, from which he graduated in 1983. He went on to attend the University of Michigan, graduating with a bachelor's degree in English in 1987.

== Career ==
Leibovich got his start as a journalist writing for Boston's alternative weekly The Phoenix, where he worked for four years. After that, he moved to California and worked as a general assignment reporter at The San Jose Mercury News.

In 1997, Leibovich moved to Washington, D.C., to work at The Washington Post, where he spent nine years, first covering the national technology sector for the Post's business section, then as a national political writer for the paper's Style section.

In 2006, Leibovich was hired by The New York Times, where he was a national political correspondent in the Times' Washington Bureau. He then became Chief National Correspondent at The New York Times Magazine in 2012.

In 2022, Leibovich joined The Atlantic as a staff writer.

=== Broadcasting ===
Leibovich is a political analyst for NBC and MSNBC, and appears regularly on Morning Joe, Deadline: White House with Nicolle Wallace and Meet the Press. Previously, Leibovich was a political contributor to CBS News. He has also appeared on numerous late-night shows, including CBS's Late Night with Stephen Colbert, Comedy Central's The Daily Show with Jon Stewart and Trevor Noah and HBO's Real Time with Bill Maher and On the Record with Bob Costas, and Showtime's The Circus.

=== Writing ===
In addition to his political writing, Leibovich has also written:

- The New Imperialists, a collection of profiles of technology pioneers, published January 2002, by Prentice Hall Press.
- This Town: Two Parties and a Funeral – Plus, Plenty of Valet Parking – in America's Gilded Capital
- Citizens of the Green Room, an anthology of Leibovich's profiles in the New York Times and Washington Post, published November 2014 by Blue Rider Press.
- Big Game: The NFL in Dangerous Times, a behind-the-scenes look at the owners and commissioner of the National Football League, published September 2018, by Penguin Books.
- Thank You for your Servitude: Donald Trump's Washington and the Price of Submission published July 2022

==== This Town ====
Leibovich is the author of This Town: Two Parties and a Funeral – Plus, Plenty of Valet Parking! – in America's Gilded Capital. The book debuted at No. 1 on the New York Times nonfiction bestseller list in July 2013, and remained on the list for 12 weeks. Leibovich discussed This Town on The Daily Show with Jon Stewart, ABC's This Week with George Stephanopoulos, Charlie Rose, PBS's Moyers and Company and NPR's Weekend Edition. He also appeared as a contestant on NPR's Wait, Wait Don't Tell Me. In a February 2014 edition of Jeopardy!, This Town was the answer to a clue in the category “2013 Bestsellers.”

In advance of its July 2013 release, Politico published an article describing This Town as a "chronicle" of the "incestuous ecology of insider Washington". Leibovich, according to the story, is nicknamed "Leibo," and the book's original sub-title was "The Way it Works in Suck Up City". Fareed Zakaria as reviewer for the Washington Post praises it as the "hottest political book of the summer", containing " juicy anecdotes" and a tell-tale core of "corruption and dysfunction". Richard McGregor of the Financial Times described Leibovich as "like a modern-day Balzac".

In his book review for The New York Times, novelist Christopher Buckley described This Town as a series of “mini-masterpieces of politico-anthropological sociology". The Economist said This Town "may be the most pitiless examination of America’s permanent political class that has ever been conducted".

This Town was released in paperback in April 2014 in conjunction with the annual White House Correspondents Dinner, which Leibovich has described as "an abomination".

The book attracted controversy when an aide to Representative Darrell Issa was fired for sharing reporters’ e-mails with Leibovich without their knowledge.

==== Big Game: The NFL in Dangerous Times ====
Leibovich is the author of Big Game: The NFL in Dangerous Times. The book looks at a 4-year period in the NFL where Leibovich follows the most powerful people in the NFL, including commissioner Roger Goodell, quarterback Tom Brady, and Dallas Cowboys owner Jerry Jones. The book also looks at the controversies surrounding the NFL such as long-term health hazards, football's impact on concussion and brain health, and how politics have crossed into the sport.

== Awards and recognition ==
Leibovich has won a number of journalism awards, including a 2011 National Magazine Award for his profile of Politico’s Michael Allen and the changing media culture of Washington. The New Republic described Leibovich as “brutally incisive yet not without pathos” in naming him one of Washington's 25 Most Powerful, Least Famous People. Washingtonian magazine called him the "reigning master of the political profile” and The Atlantic’s Jeffrey Goldberg nominated Leibovich as Washington’s "most important journalist" for his "ability to make his profile subjects look like rock stars, on the one hand, and to make others look like complete idiots, on the other".

== Personal life ==
Leibovich lives in Washington D.C., with his wife and three daughters.

== Works ==
- Leibovich, Mark (2002). The New Imperialists: How Five Restless Kids Grew Up To Virtually Rule Your World. New Jersey: Prentice Hall Press. ISBN 978-0735203174
- Leibovich, Mark (2013) This Town: Two Parties and a Funeral-Plus, Plenty of Valet Parking!-in America's Gilded Capital. New York: Blue Rider Press. ISBN 978-0399161308
- Leibovich, Mark (2014) Citizens of the Green Room: Profiles in Courage and Self-Delusion. New York: Blue Rider Press. ISBN 978-0399171925
- Leibovich, Mark (2018) Big Game: The NFL in Dangerous Times. Penguin Press. ISBN 978-0399185427
- Leibovich, Mark (2022) Thank You for Your Servitude: Donald Trump's Washington and the Price of Submission. Penguin Press. ISBN 978-0593296318
