= Thank You for Your Servitude =

2022 book by Mark Leibovich

- First edition
- Author: Mark Leibovich
- Subject: American politics
- Publisher: Penguin Press
- Publication date: July 12, 2022
- Pages: 352
- ISBN: 9780593296318

Thank You for Your Servitude: Donald Trump's Washington and the Price of Submission is a 2022 book by Mark Leibovich on relations within the United States Republican Party during the Trump administration.
