= Big Game: The NFL in Dangerous Times =

2018 book by Mark Leibovich

- Author: Mark Leibovich
- Language: English
- Subject: National Football League
- Publisher: Penguin Press
- Publication date: September 4, 2018
- Pages: 400
- ISBN: 978-0-399-18542-7

Big Game: The NFL in Dangerous Times is a 2018 book by Mark Leibovich that examines the National Football League.
