= Iranians in the Netherlands =

Iranian diaspora in the Netherlands

Iranians in the Netherlands Iraniërs in Nederland ایرانیان هلند
Total population
- 52,099

Regions with significant populations
- Amsterdam, Rotterdam, The Hague, and other urban areas

Languages
- Dutch, Persian; Azerbaijani, Armenian, Kurdish, and other languages of Iran. (see Languages of Iran).

Religion
- Islam, Atheism; Agnosticism, Christianity, Zoroastrianism

Related ethnic groups
- Iranian citizens abroad, Iranian diaspora

Iranians in the Netherlands (Dutch: Iraniërs in Nederland; Persian: ایرانیان هلند) form one of the newer and larger populations of the Iranian diaspora in Europe.

== Terminology ==
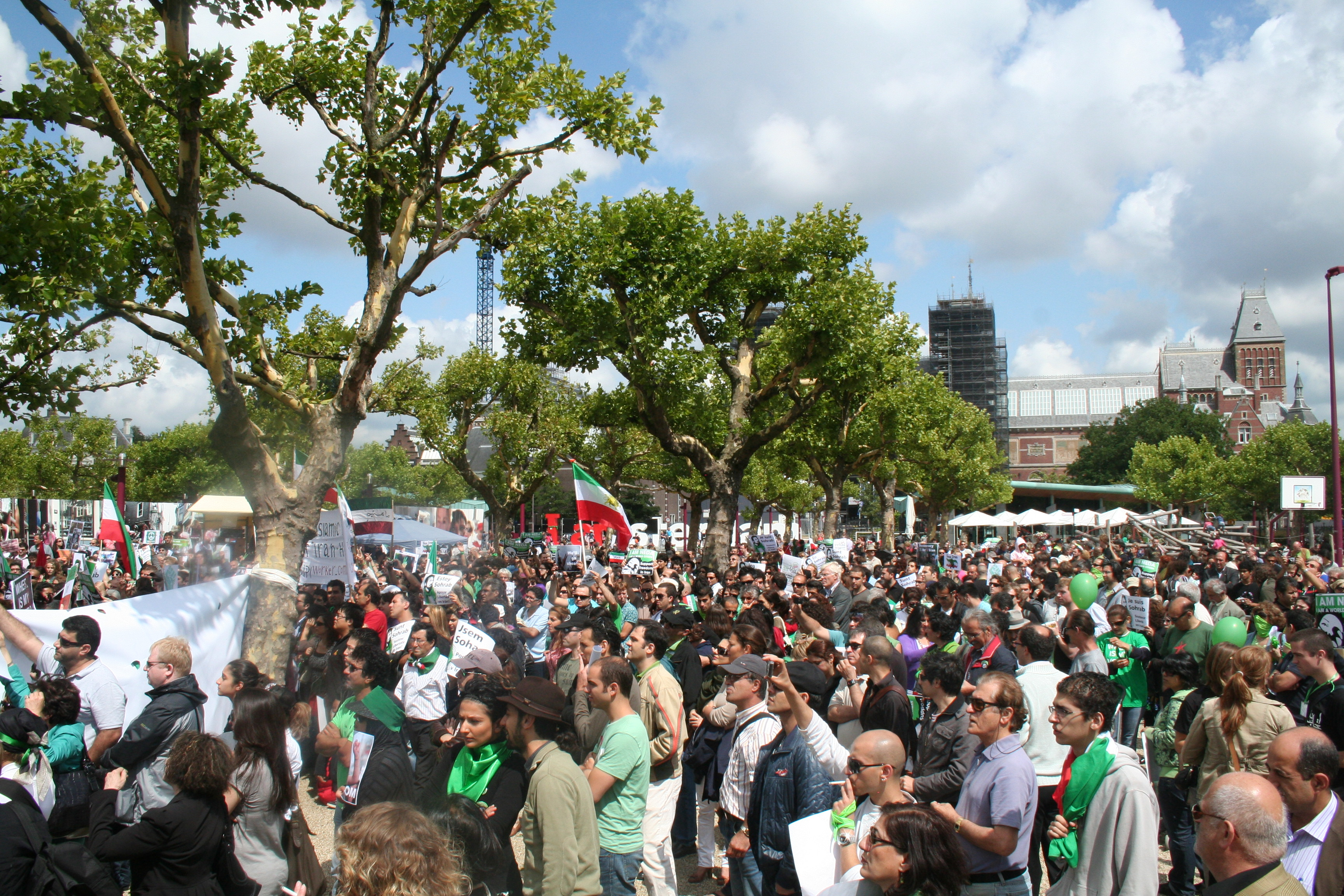
The Netherlands' Persian Community's Demonstration "UNITED4IRAN", Amsterdam, 2009

Iranians in the Netherlands have commonly been referred to as Dutch Iranians (Nederlandse Iraniërs) or Iranian Dutch (Iraanse Nederlanders), in addition to Dutch Persians (Nederlandse Perzen) or Persian Dutch (Perzische Nederlanders). However, one scholar who used the term "Dutch Iranians" also expressed reservations over the validity of such a "hyphenated notion of identity" in the Dutch context, in comparison to the less problematic term "Iranian American".

Other collective terms used to refer to the Iranian diaspora in the Netherlands include "Iranian community" (Iraanse gemeenschap), "Persian community" (Perzische gemeenschap), and simply "Persians" (Perzen).

== Migration history ==
Though the Netherlands had a nominally Persian population since the early seventeenth century, this consisted mostly of Armenian merchants (the so-called Persianen), who, by the beginning of the nineteenth century, had largely assimilated into the larger Dutch population. In more recent times, other European countries, such as Germany and France, have had Persian communities since the early 20th century, whereas most of the Iranian population in the Netherlands is of relatively recent provenance; virtually all came to the country after the Iranian Revolution of 1979. The overall migration was quite significant relative to the whole size of Iranian emigration to Europe; from 1990 to 1999, the Netherlands was Europe's second most-popular destination for Iranian asylum seekers, behind Germany. However, from 1981 to 2001, only 1,292 were formally recognised as "invited refugees" (Dutch: Uitgenodigde vluchtelingen), the vast majority in the period 1987–1990.

== Demographic characteristics ==
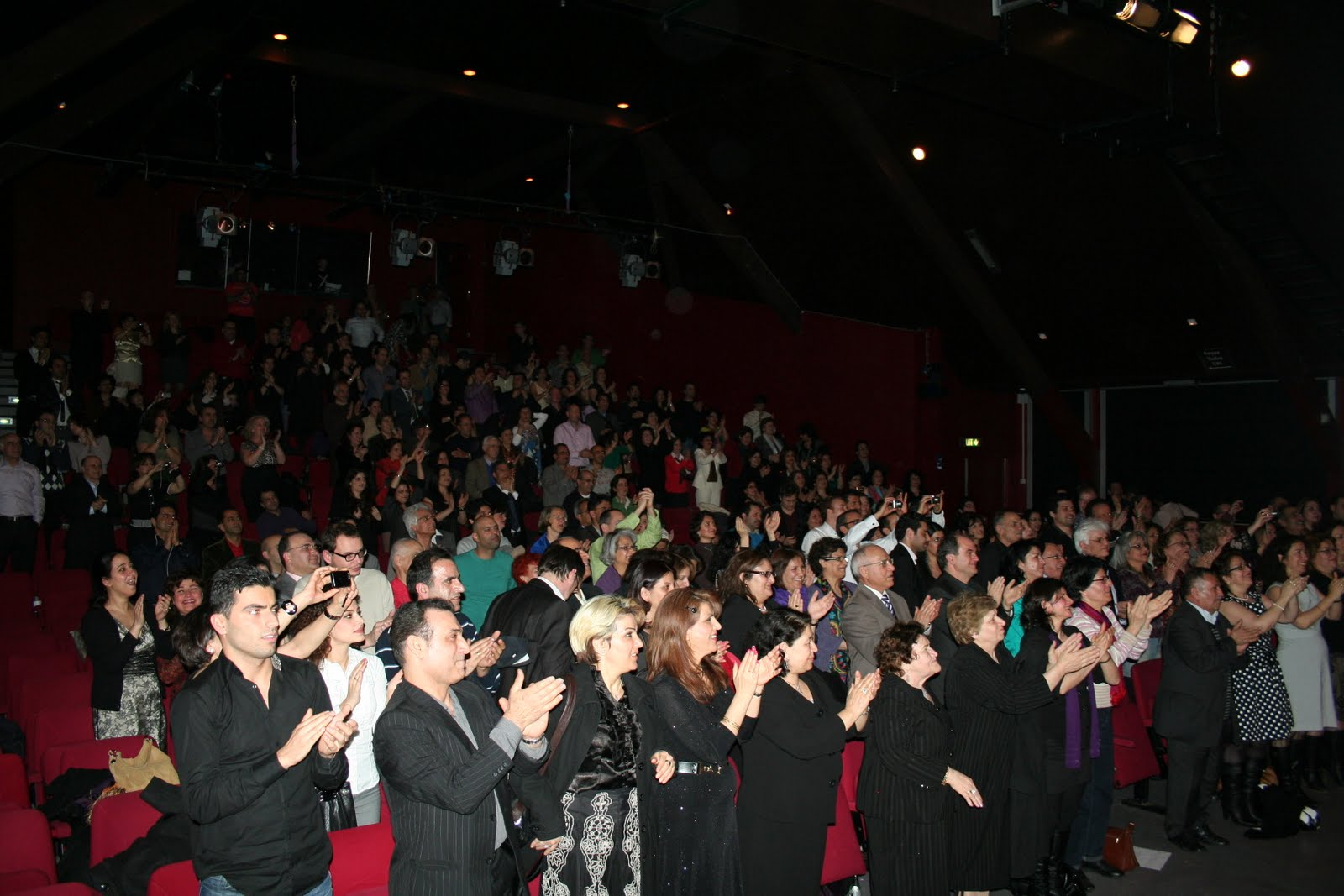
People at Sima Bina's Nowruz concert in Amsterdam, 2010

As of 2009, statistics of the Dutch Centraal Bureau voor de Statistiek showed:

- 24,535 Iranian-born persons (13,603 men, 10,932 women)
- 6,082 locally born persons of Iranian background (3,159 men, 2,923 women), of which:
  - 2,491 persons with one parent also born locally (1,321 men, 1,170 women)
  - 3,591 persons with both parents born abroad (1,838 men, 1,753 women)

For a total of 30,617 persons (16,758 men, 13,855 women). This represented nearly double the 1996 total of 16,478 persons. Numerically, most of the growth was in the foreign-born segment of the population, whose numbers increased from 14,628 over the period in question; however, the rate of growth was fastest in the locally born segment of the population, which almost tripled in size from 1,850 persons.

== Religion ==
Iran is a largely Muslim country, a fact reflected in the backgrounds of Iranian migrants to the Netherlands. However, most migrants do not continue to practise their religion. Those who do often find themselves viewed as threats and suffer exclusion from Dutch society; this trend strengthened with the growth of political Islam in the 1980s.

In 2007, Ehsan Jami, a Dutch politician of Iranian descent, criticised the Islamic prophet Muhammad, describing him as a "criminal". Together with Loubna Berrada (founder of the Advisory Committee for Integration, part of the People's Party for Freedom and Democracy), Jami founded the Central Committee for Ex-Muslims in 2007. The organisation, supported by Afshin Ellian, aims to support apostates from Islam and to bring forth the reality of women's rights violations in the religion. On 4 August 2007, Jami was attacked in his hometown Voorburg by three men. The attack was widely believed to be linked to his activities for the committee. The national anti-terrorism coordinator's office, the public prosecution department, and the police decided during a meeting on 6 August that "additional measures" were necessary for the protection of Jami, who subsequently received extra security.

== Education ==
Iranians in the Netherlands are regarded as one of the highest educated and best integrated ethnic groups, according to various sources such as the Erasmus University Rotterdam and Statistics Netherlands. Not unrelated, the Iranian academic community has grown significantly, including professors Turaj Atabaki, Afshin Ellian, Halleh Ghorashi and Majid Hassanizadeh.

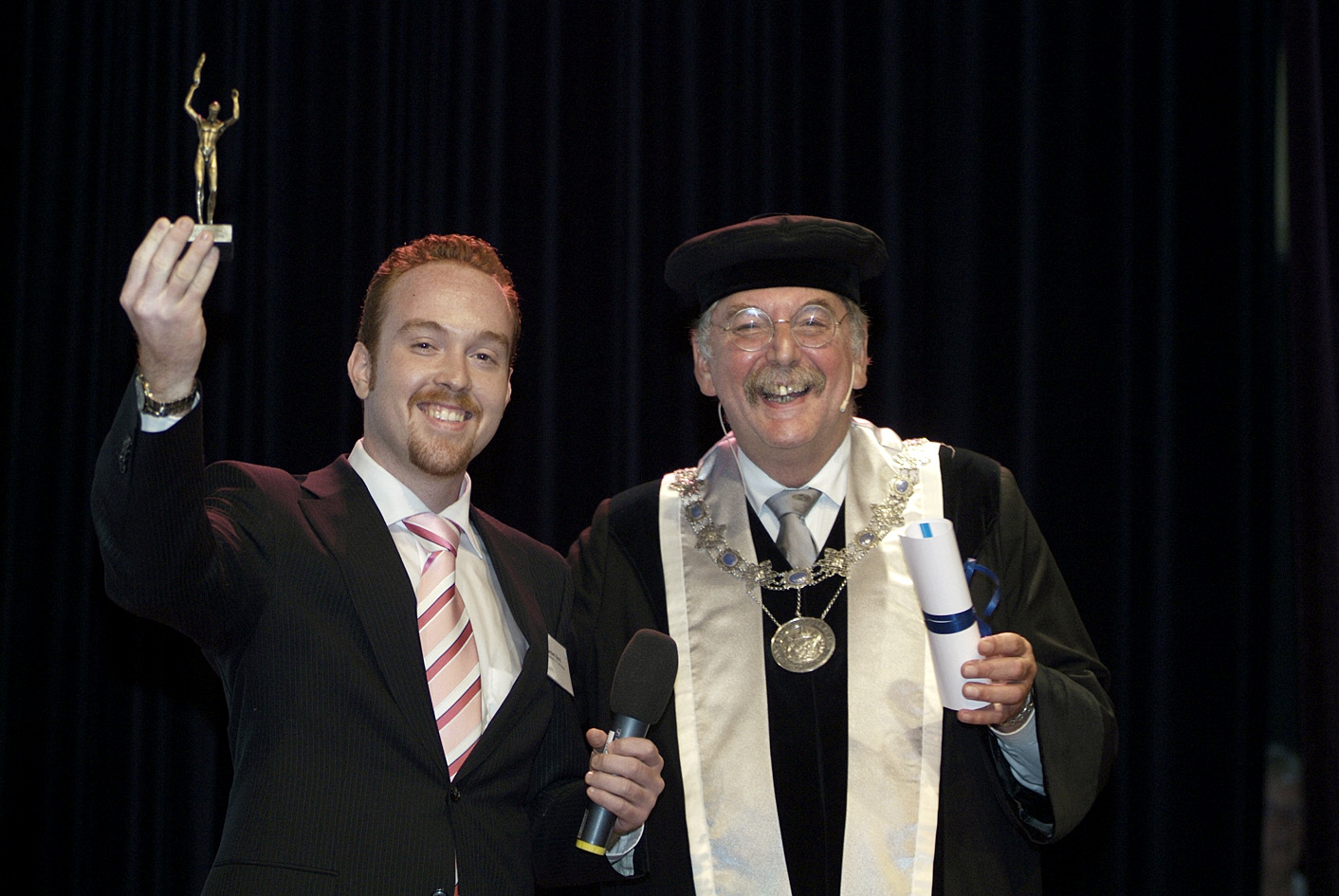
Iranian student Fardad Zand receives 2006 "Rector Magnificus" Prize at Delft University.

=== Discrimination against Iranian students ===
Due to the Iranian government's nuclear activities, United Nations Security Council Resolution 1737, which among other matters called on UN member states to prevent Iranian students from receiving specialised training which might be of use to the nuclear programme of Iran, the Dutch government implemented a variety of restrictions on Iranian students in the Netherlands.

At the recommendation of the government, the University of Twente went so far as to halt its admissions of students from Iran entirely, stating that it could not ensure they would have no access to nuclear-related information. However, the government later backed away from this policy. In July, they announced that Iranian students could be admitted but would be restricted from taking certain courses and visiting certain places related to the development of nuclear weapons. In response, a group of Iranian students filed suit against the government, alleging that the restrictions violated the prohibition against all forms of discrimination established by Article 1 of the Constitution of the Netherlands. A local court ruled in February 2010 that the University of Twente discriminate against Iranians by refusing their admission due to their nationalities. The case went up to the Supreme Court of the Netherlands in The Hague. The final verdict of the Supreme Court confirmed the initial verdict that the ban on Iranian students is discriminatory, unlawful and a breach to European Human Rights treaty and therefore the discriminatory regulations were overruled

=== Iran Academia ===
In September 2011, Iran Academia: The Institute for Social Sciences and Humanities was established in The Hague by a group known as the Iranian Progressive Youth (IPY). The IPY, which had its origins in the Iranian Green Movement in 2009, had grown into a network of students and researchers around the world, including in Europe, North America and Australia. Iran Academia was established with the support of Iranian academics worldwide.

== Political activities ==
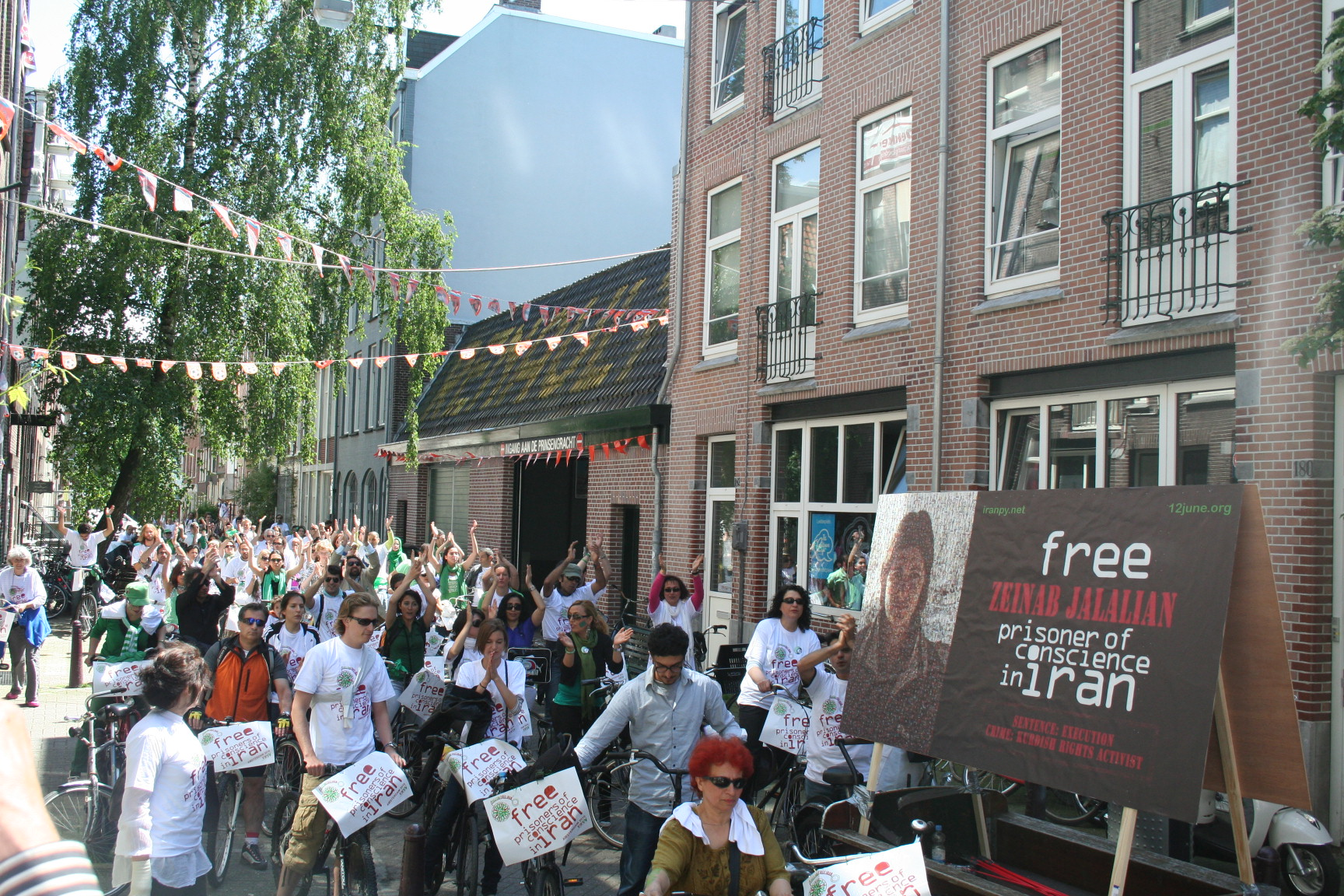
Dutch-Persians Shout for Freedom on Bike, June 2010, a demonstration organized by Iranian Progressive Youth in cooperation with the Persian Dutch Network

The first serious conflicts between the Pahlavi government and students in the Netherlands began in the 1970s. In 1974, a group of Iranians based in the Netherlands and other European countries occupied the Embassy of Iran in Wassenaar. Another group occupied the embassy in August 1978, and were arrested by the police. Their lawyer stated to Dutch daily Nieuwsblad van het Noorden that "Wassenar Police gives information to Persia".

The early migration of political activists and their applications for asylum in the Netherlands following the 1979 Iranian Revolution had a major effect on the development of the Iranian community; the suspected links between the Islamic Republic embassies in Europe and the murders of prominent exiles such as the France-based former prime minister Shapour Bakhtiar, as well as rumours of information leaks to the Iranian embassy in The Hague from within the Dutch government, led to suspicion by Iranians both towards their fellow Iranians and towards the Dutch authorities. In 1996, Dutch daily Trouw revealed that one fairly prominent man in the Iranian community in Amsterdam, Mahmoed Jafhari (known by the alias "Anoosh"), had been working for the Iranian intelligence service to gather information on exiles; he had recorded on tape every conversation held in his house with his fellow Iranians, a fact which was discovered only after his death. The social environment created by that event has resulted in numerous difficulties for later academic research.

Since the 2009–2010 Iranian election protests, the Iranian community in the Netherlands organised many solidarity demonstrations in Amsterdam, The Hague, Delft and Groningen. In January 2010, when the Islamic Republic Embassy in The Hague organized a "Peace Concert" at Rotterdam's De Doelen Concert Hall, it had to be stopped in the middle, because of physical confrontations between angry protesters and the embassy agents.

In April 2010 a group of Iranian and Dutch protesters occupied parts of Islamic Republic Embassy in the Hague in protest to Iran's oppressive and violent policies. During this act of protest, the flag of the Islamic Republic has been lowered and replaced with a banner bearing an image of Neda Agha Soltan, the woman who was shot to death in Tehran's street protests after the disputed June presidential elections.

In June 2010 the Dutch TV Channel NOS organized a visit for Ezzatollah Zarghami, director of Islamic Republic of Iran Broadcasting, to its headquarters in Hilversum. Radio Zamaneh revealed this news, creating a wave of anger in the Iranian community. The Hague-based Iranian Progressive Youth Network also published a press release entitled "NOS Welcomes the Terrorist". The event was canceled a few days before the visit. The whole affair was reported in mainstream Dutch media such as NRC Handelsblad.

In 2011, Iran executed Zahra Bahrami, a naturalised Dutch citizen of Iranian origin, after holding her in prison since 2009 on drugs charges. The Dutch ambassador in Tehran was not allowed to offer her assistance.

== Media ==
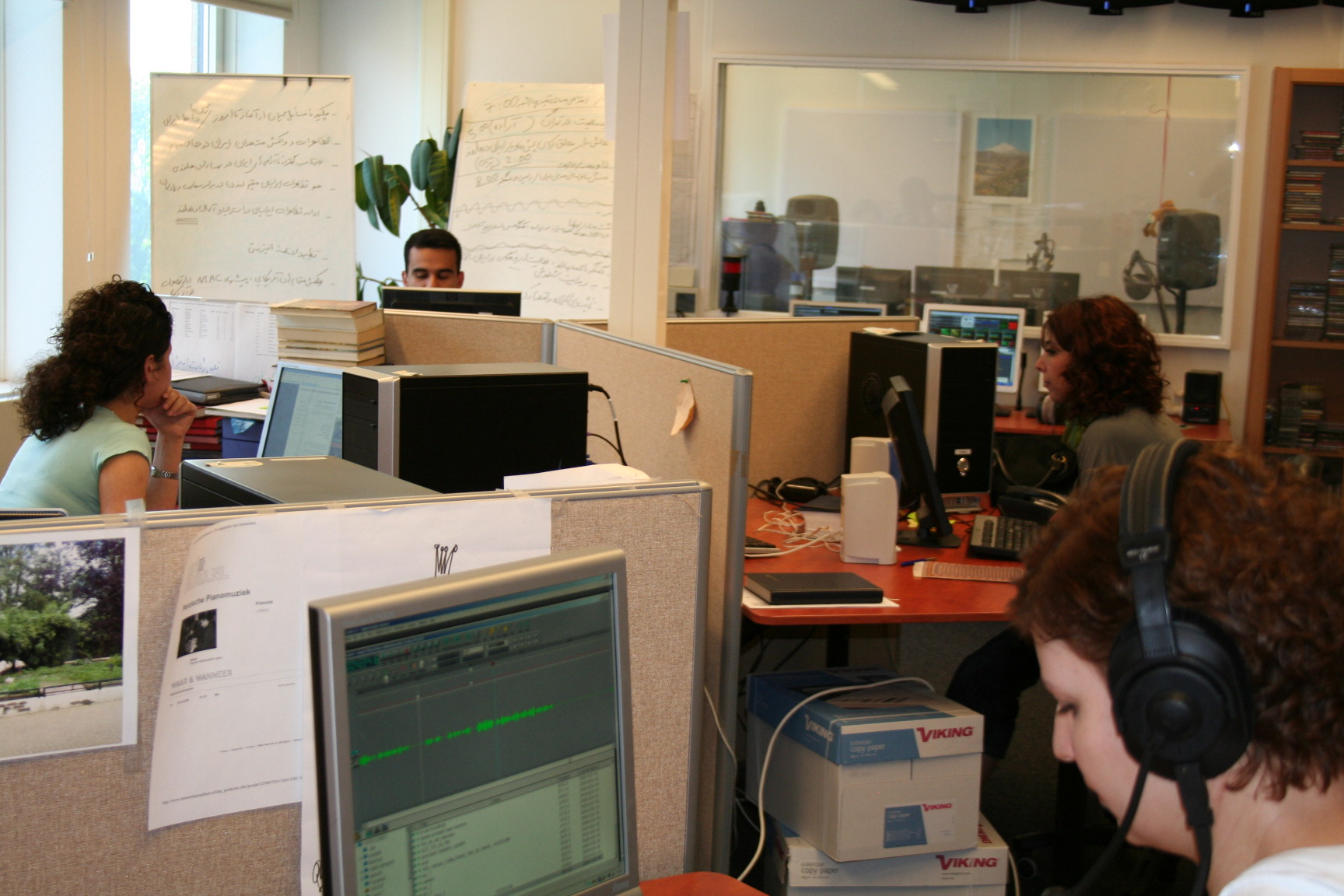
The Persian-language Radio Zamaneh in Amsterdam, 2008

In 2004 the Dutch Parliament agreed with the proposal for allocating 15 million Euros to set up a television station, which would broadcast in the Persian language. This was the first time that a European Union country had been involved in establishing a Persian television station on its own.

The Persian-language Radio Zamaneh began operating in Amsterdam in August 2006 with support from the Dutch Ministry of Foreign Affairs. The Islamic Republic of Iran has on various occasions criticised the Netherlands for funding the station. During the 2009 public unrest and demonstrations in Iran, Majid Ghahremani, Iranian ambassador to The Netherlands, accused the Dutch government of interfering in Iran's internal affairs. At the same time, a Dutch foreign ministry spokeswoman told Reuters that they had decided to continue to provide funding to the radio station, with the aim of improving the situation of human rights in Iran.

In January 2010 also Persian Dutch Network has been registered in Amsterdam to introduce Persian culture to Dutch people and make two nations more close to each other. PDN has also released various videos of cultural events, social gatherings and political demonstrations of Persian community in the Netherlands on the Internet.

== Integration and community ==
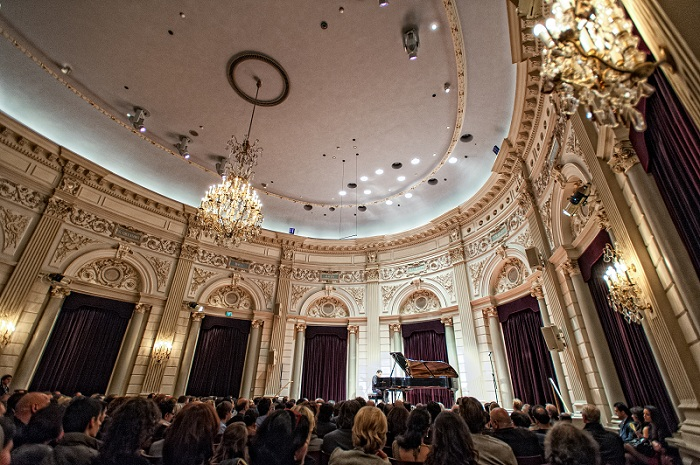
Persian piano music recital by Pejman Akbarzadeh at Amsterdam Concertgebouw, April 2012

Iranians in the Netherlands have founded relatively few community organisations compared to Turkish or Moroccan migrants; this may be due to the general atmosphere of distrust and divisiveness among Iranians abroad. In contrast to other migrant groups, there is little sense of community among them. Possibly as a result of this, many Iranians have redirected their ideological energies into participation in mainstream Dutch politics; prominent examples include politician Farah Karimi of the GreenLeft party or commentator and professor Afshin Ellian.

Women tend to report far lower levels of discrimination than men. However, they still often confront mainstream stereotypes of Muslim women, such as the idea that they are victims of domestic violence in need of emancipation from Muslim men.

== Art and culture ==
- In 2023 Virgule Film & Performance Art Compagny (Tehran) created in collaboration with Altstadt Rotterdam the performance 'I AM ANTIGONE'. Internationally celebrated author Naghmeh Samini wrote a new adaptation of the Greek tragedy 'Antigone' especially for this performance.
- There is an active "Persian Language and Culture" Department at the University of Leiden in the Netherlands.
- There are Persian artists, writers, musicians, etc. who are active in the Netherlands, among them filmmaker Reza Allamehzadeh and storyteller Sahand Sahebdivani.
- In 2006, graphic designer Reza Abedini received 2006 Principal Prince Claus Award.
- In the summer 2008 Amsterdam Branch of Hermitage Museum organized the exhibition "Persia: Thirty Centuries of Culture and Art" for six months.
- Museum Het Ursulinenconvent – International Museum for Family History / Internationaal Museum voor Familiegeschiedenis in Eijsden, Limburg, has a permanent exhibition on Persian family history and Persian photography. Also in this museum, the harem system is being explained using the Qajar family and dynasty as an example.

== Notable people ==
- Ali Niknam, Entrepreneur, founder of Bunq
- Kader Abdolah, author
- Pejman Akbarzadeh, musician and journalist
- Sevda Alizadeh, known as Sevdaliza, singer
- Reza Allamehzadeh, filmmaker
- Touraj Atabaki, professor of social history of the Middle East and Central Asia, International Institute of Social History
- Zahra Bahrami, convicted of drug trafficking and executed in Iran in 2011
- Leo Barjesteh, historian, publisher and museum director
- Afshin Ellian, university professor
- Reza Ghoochannejhad, footballer
- Farah Karimi, politician and former MP
- Biurakn Hakhverdian, water polo player, olympic gold medalist and former captain of the Dutch national junior water polo team
- Majid Hassanizadeh, professor of hydrogeology
- Gegard Mousasi, mixed martial artist
- Sholeh Rezazadeh, writer and poet

== See also ==
- Iran–Netherlands relations
- Iranian diaspora
- Immigration to the Netherlands

== Images ==
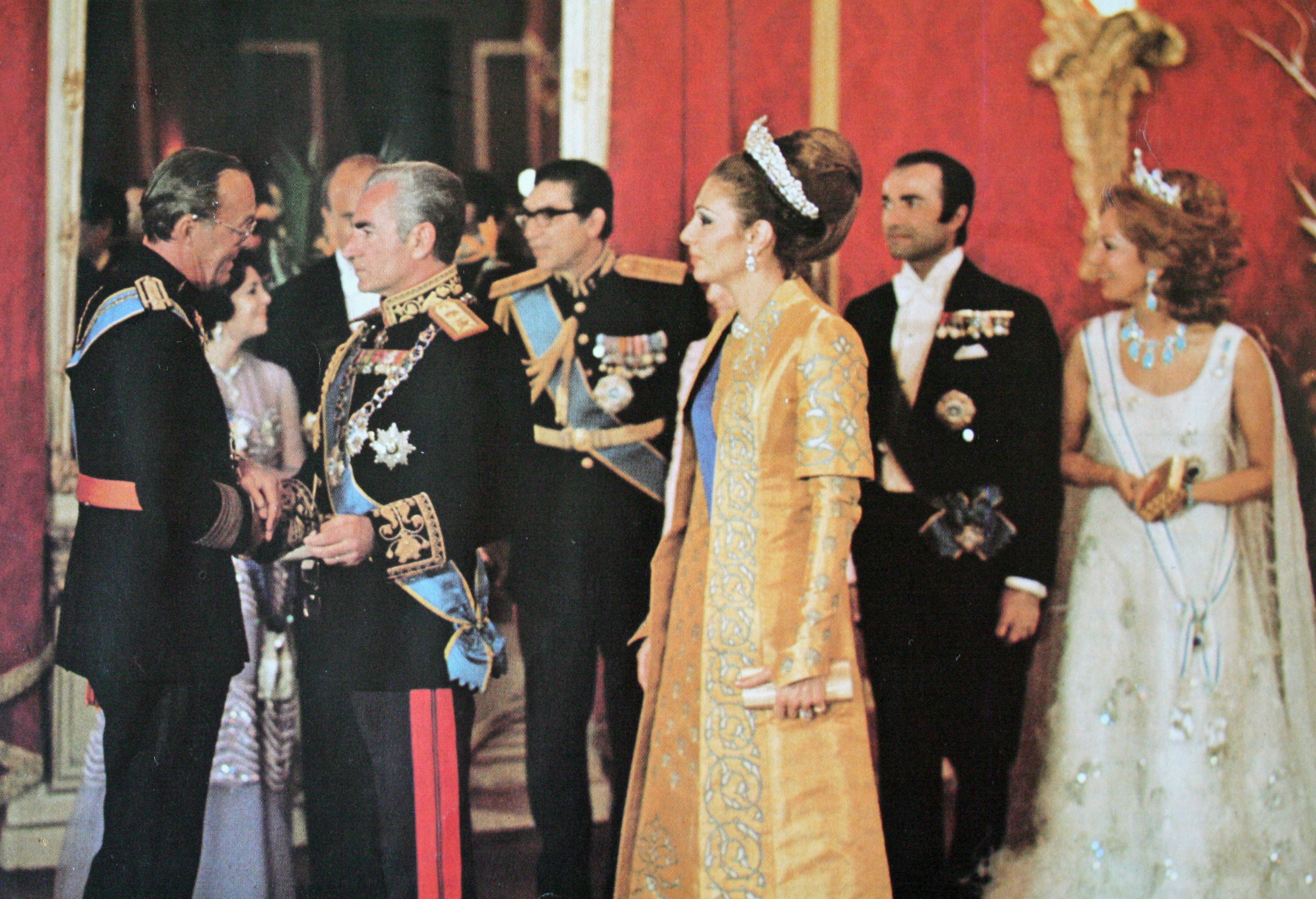
The Netherlands' Prince Bernhard, Shah of Persia and Queen Farah, Tehran, 1970s

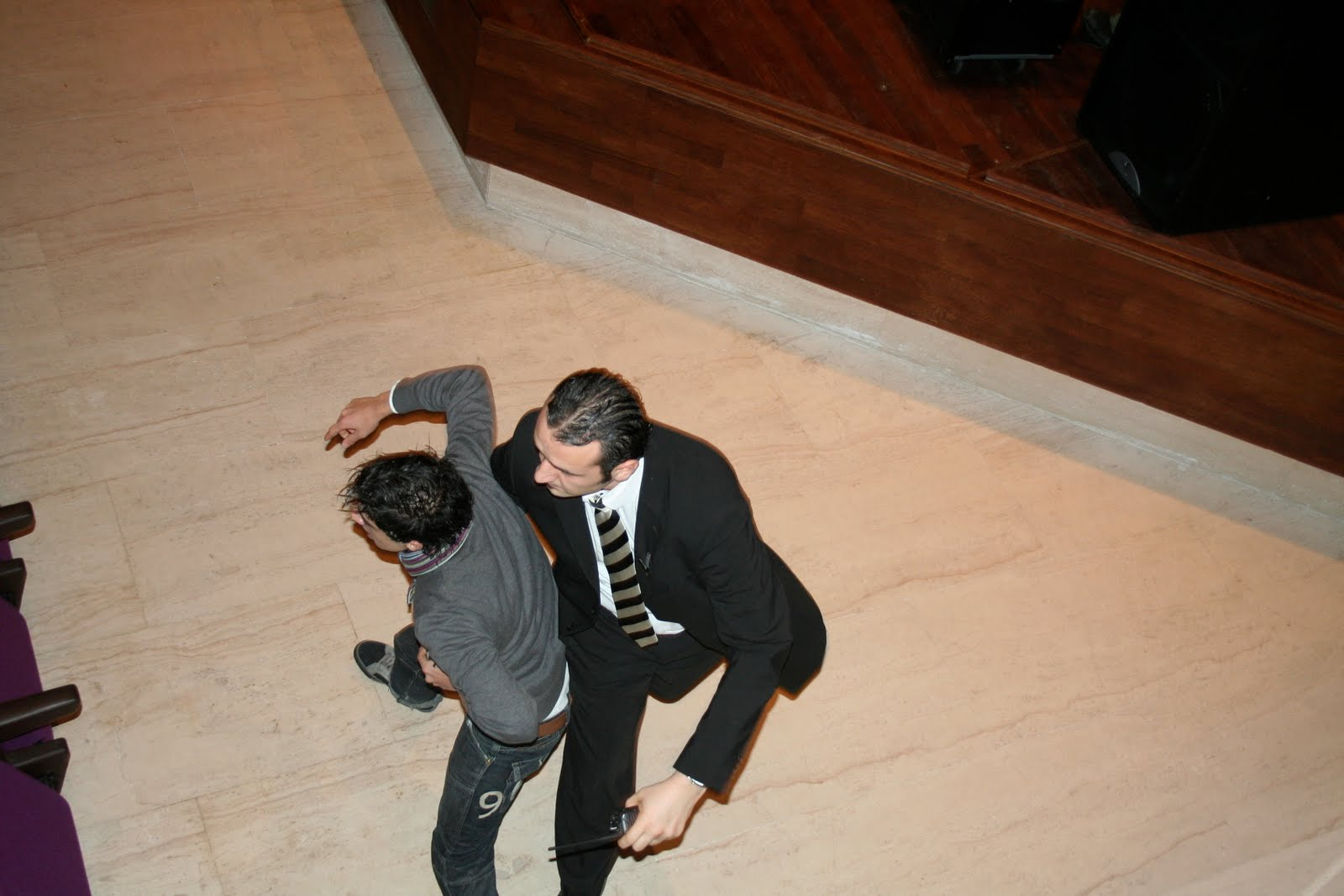
Angry Persian protester shouts "Death to Islamic Republic" at "Peace Concert" organized by the Islamic Republic Embassy at Rotterdam's De Doelen Concert Hall.

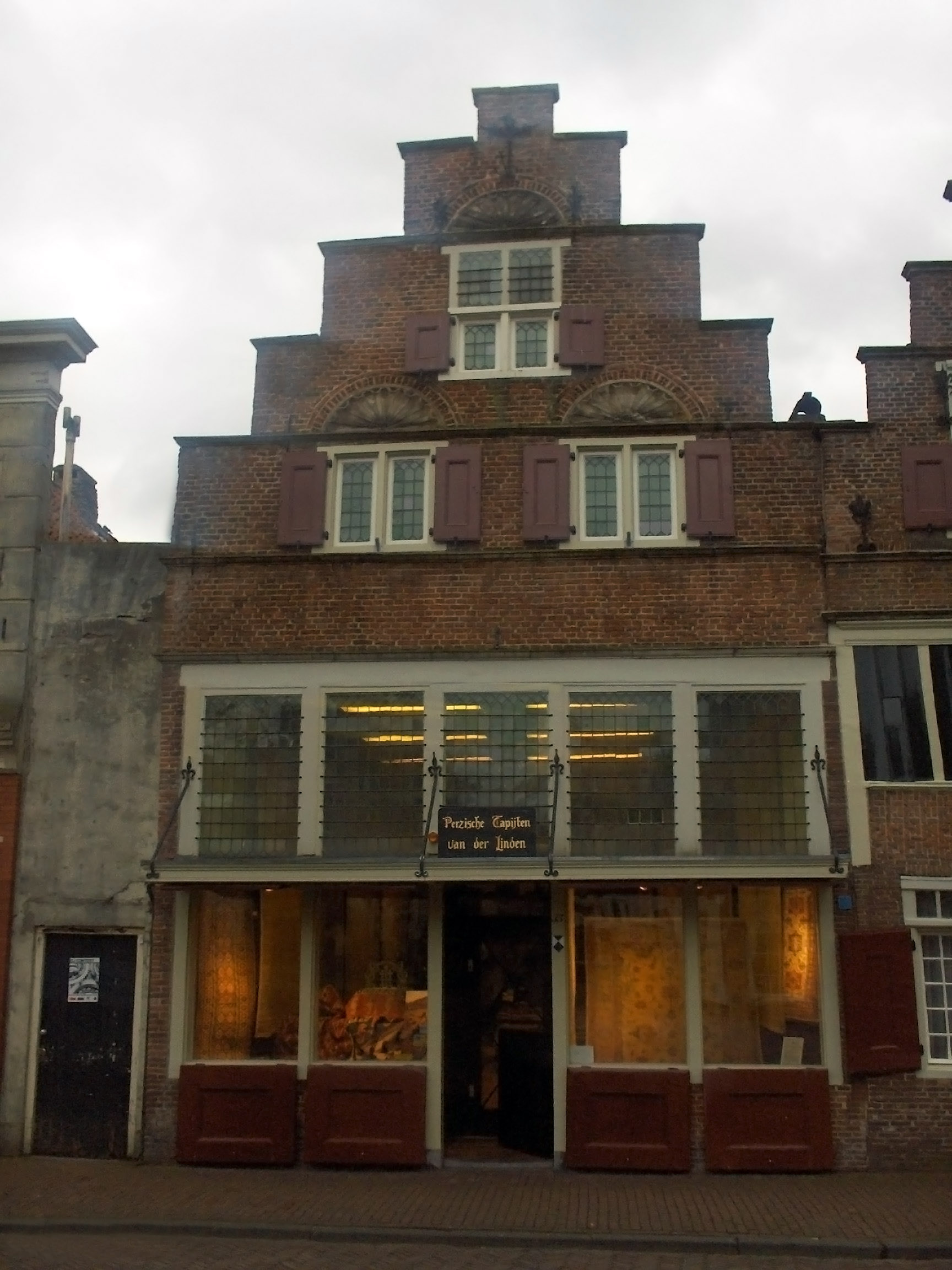
An Old Persian Carpet Gallery in Amersfoort, Central Netherlands

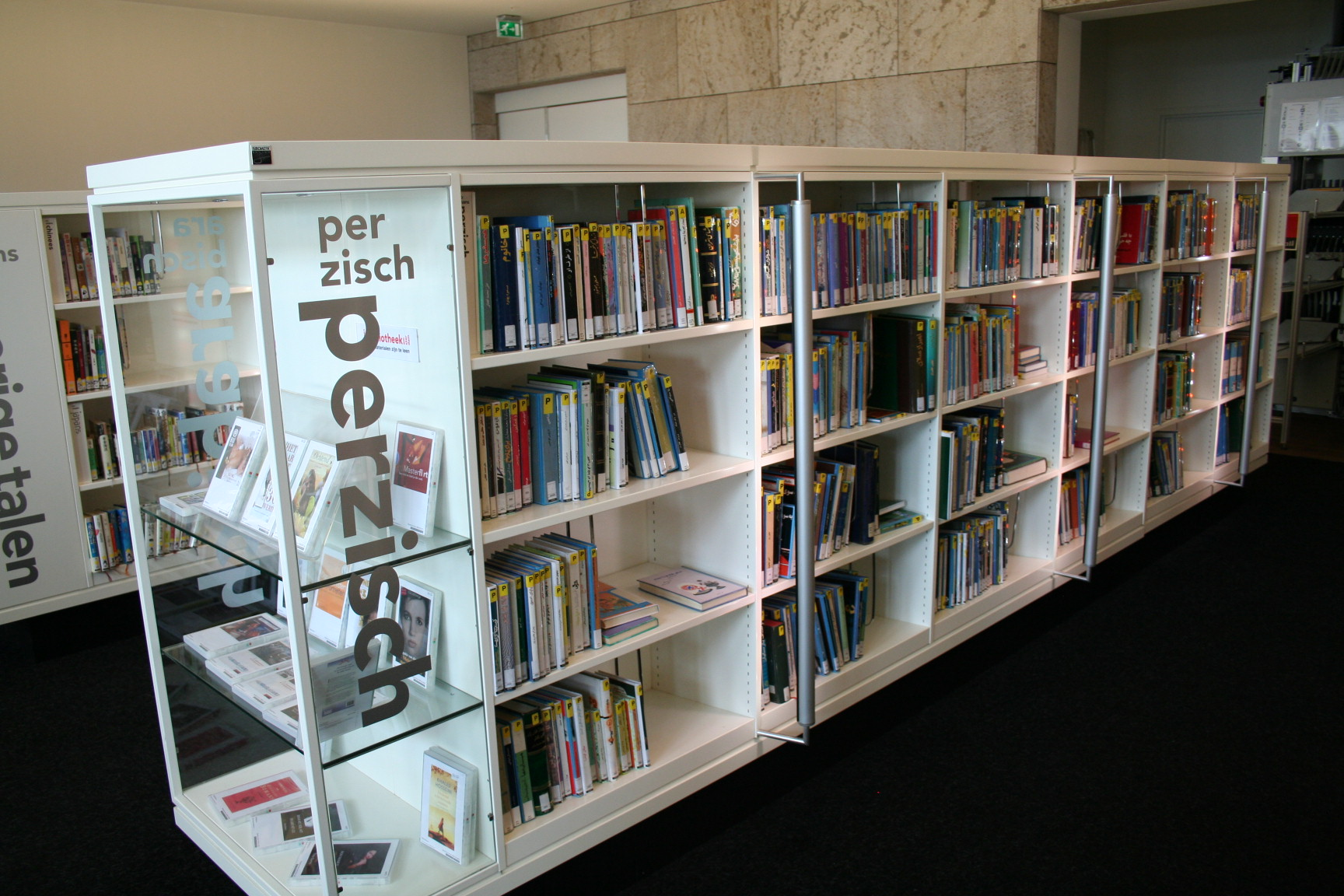
Persian-language books section at the Amsterdam Public Library

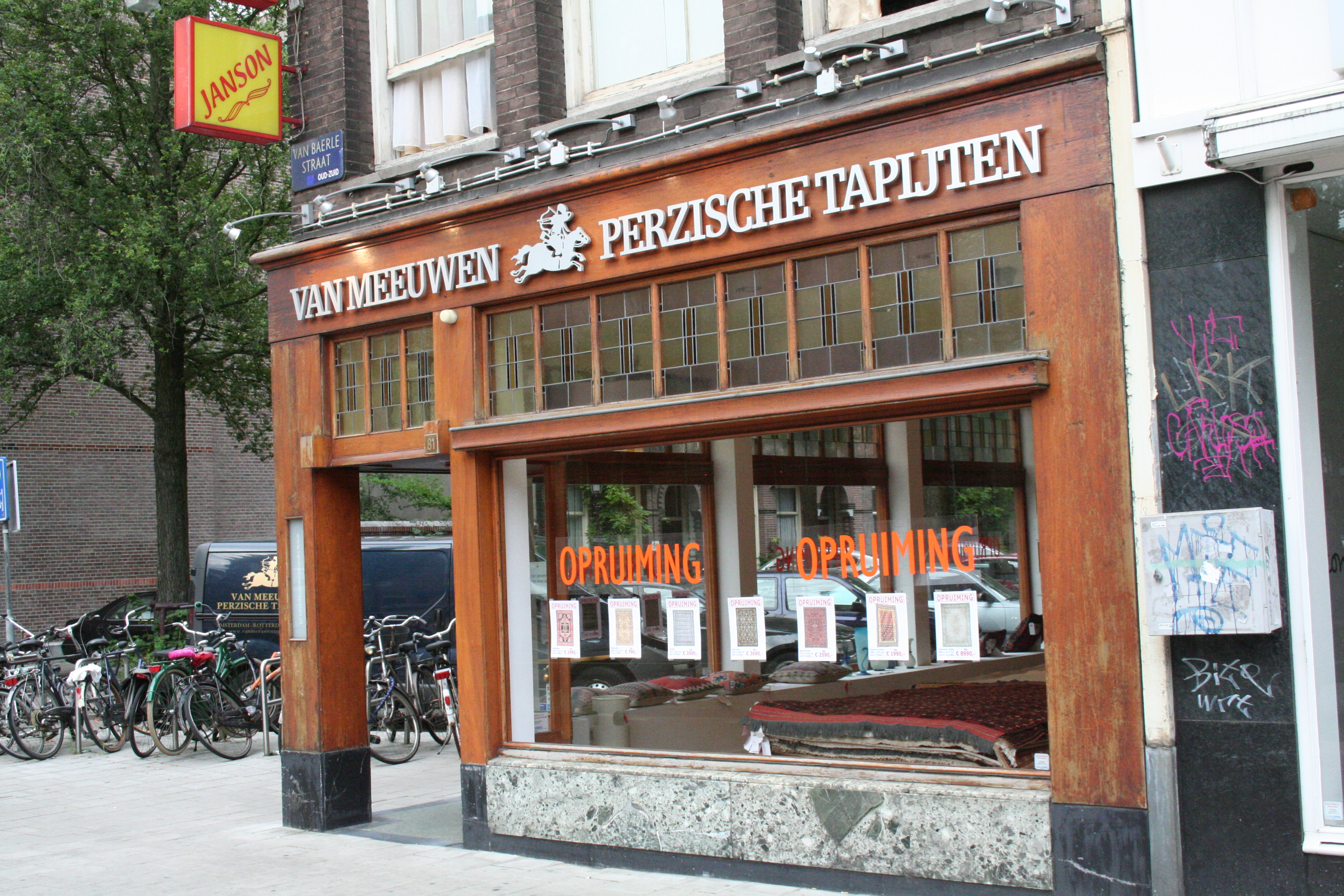
A Persian carpet Gallery in Old center Amsterdam, July 2010

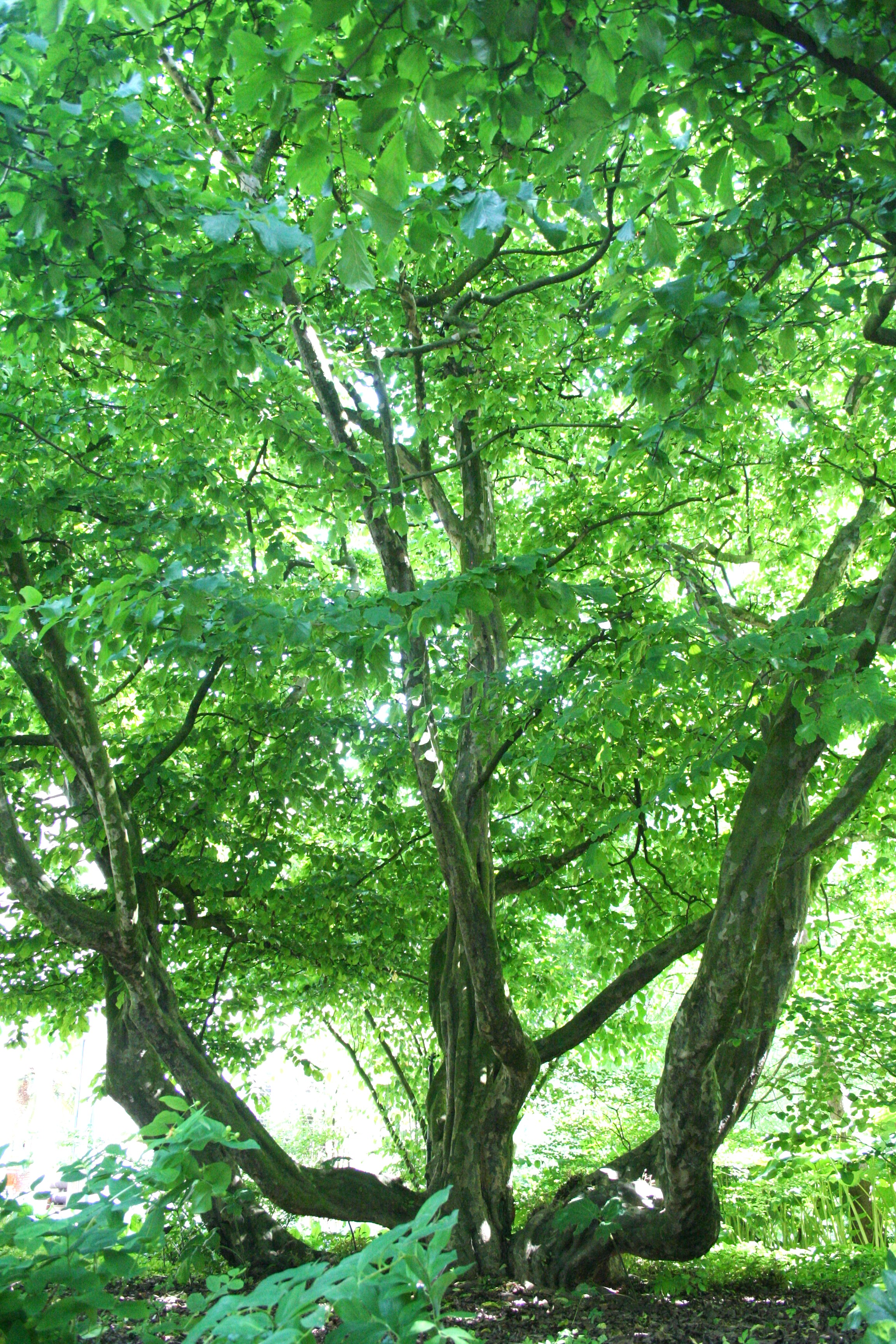
Persian Ironwood Tree, brought from Persia to the Netherlands in 1895

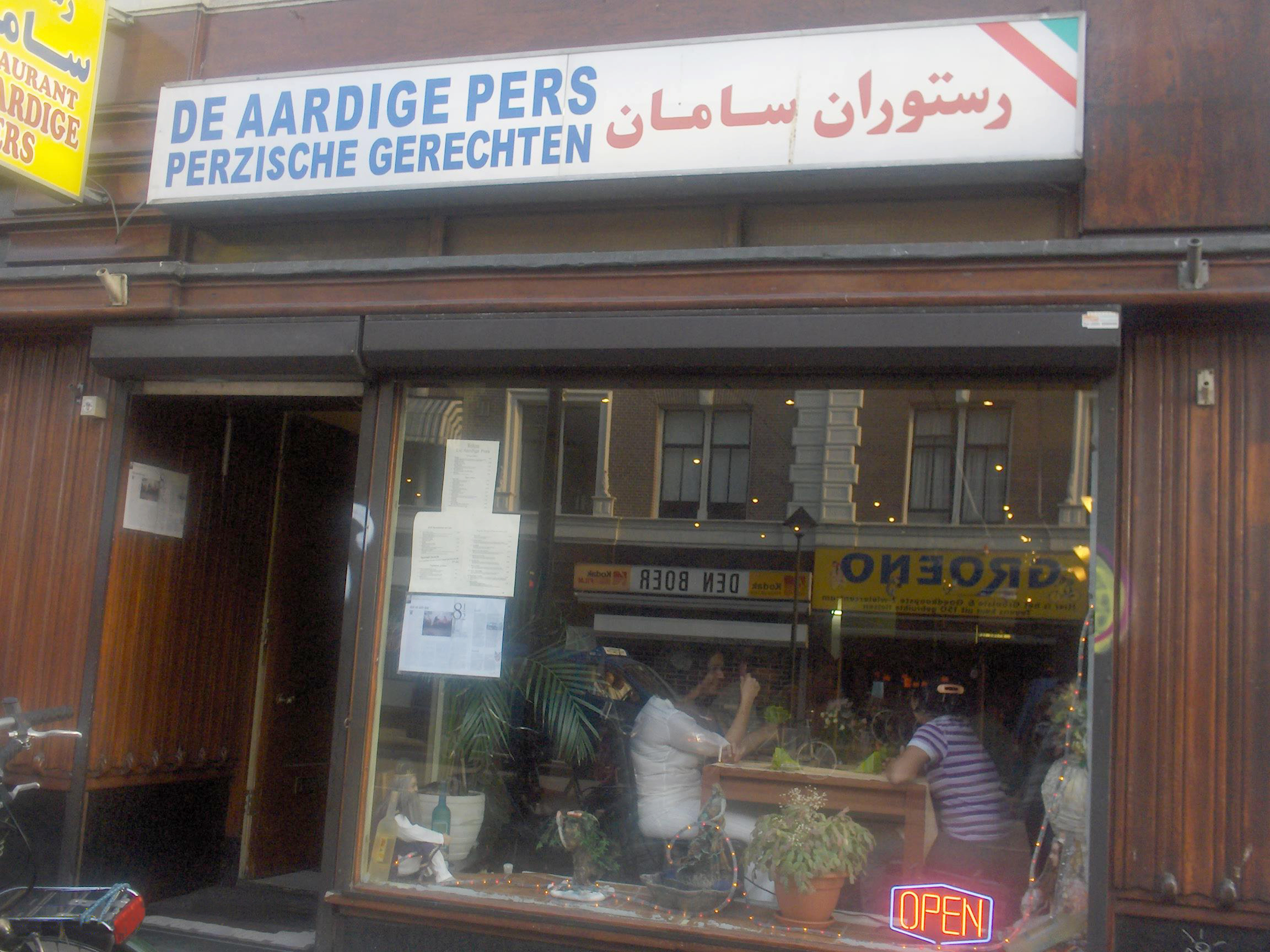
A Persian restaurant in Amsterdam, 2006

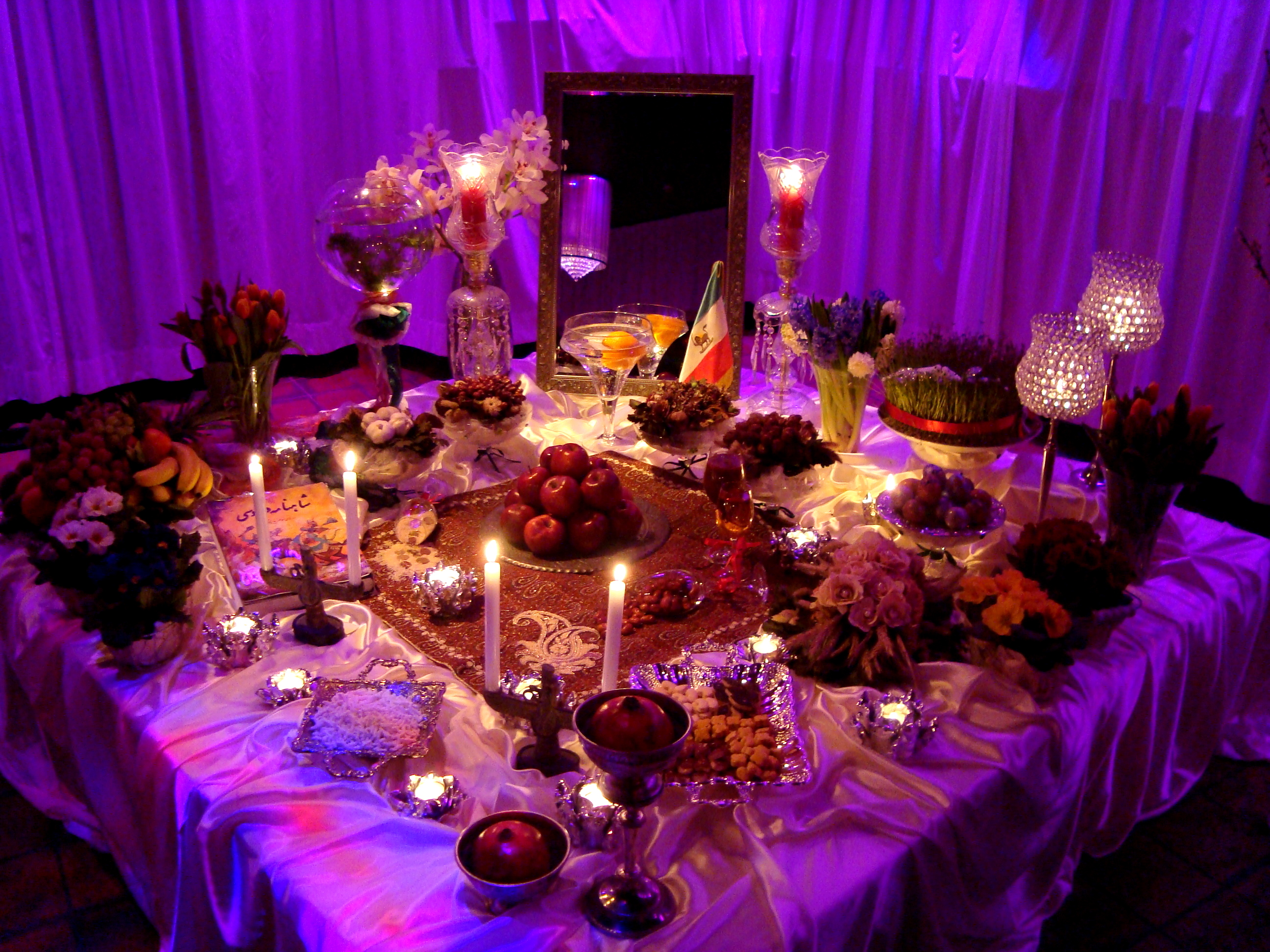
Haft-Sin table for Nowruz / Persian New Year Celebration in Uitgeest, 2010
