= Roozonline =

Persian and English news website

Rooz (Persian: روز, literally day) was a Persian and English news website. It was mostly staffed by exiled Iranian journalists including Masoud Behnoud, Ebrahim Nabavi, Farah Karimi, and Nikahang Kowsar with occasional articles by activists and journalists inside Iran, including Shirin Ebadi and Ahmad Zeidabadi. Another contributor is Hossein Derakhshan, who has been under arrest in Tehran since 1 November 2008.

It was first published on the web on May 10, 2005. It is published by "Iran Gooya" (registered in France).

== Controversy ==
In November 2006, Hossein Derakhshan who maintained the Rooz website claimed on his blog that he was accused of working for the Islamic Republic government and therefore not paid for a year by Rooz. Furthermore, he hoped that Hivos, a Dutch organization that helps to fund for Rooz, would pressure them to allow more freedom of speech to their staff. In response, Nikahang Kowsar claimed that Derakhshan has taken the website "hostage" and that he demands "ransom", and asked director Hossein Bastani to confront Derakhshan.

== See also ==
- Radio Zamaneh
