= Ebrahim Nabavi =

Iranian satirist, writer, diarist and researcher (1958–2025)

Seyyed Ebrahim Nabavi
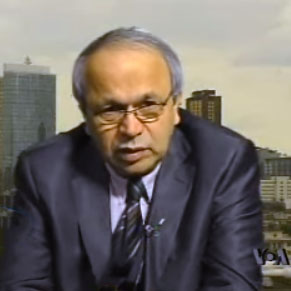
- Nabavi in 2010
- Born: 13 November 1958; Astara, Iran
- Died: 15 January 2025 (aged 66); Silver Spring, Maryland, U.S.
- Occupations: Satirist, writer, diarist, researcher, radio host

Seyyed Ebrahim Nabavi (Persian: سید ابراهیم نبوی; 13 November 1958 – 15 January 2025) was an Iranian satirist, writer, diarist and researcher. He contributed to the news website Gooya and the online newspaper Rooz, and had a satirical program for the website and broadcasts on the Amsterdam based Radio Zamaneh.

== Early career ==
During and after studying sociology at Shiraz University and University of Tehran, but before starting his political career in Tehran, Nabavi also worked as a school teacher, and taught philosophy in the Jihad of Construction (جهاد سازندگی) effort.

Nabavi started his political career working for the Iranian government in the Ministry of Culture and Islamic Guidance, the Ministry of Interior (personally invited by Ali Akbar Nategh-Nouri), and the Islamic Republic of Iran Broadcasting (personally invited by Mohammad Hashemi). His posts include the Manager of the Political Office of the Ministry of Interior in 1361–1364 AP (ca. 1982–1985 CE). According to himself, he was chosen because of his wide political knowledge about the Iranian political issues, because of his past activities with the Office for Strengthening Unity and the Organization of Muslim Students of Shiraz University, where he had worked with Ata'ollah Mohajerani, Jamileh Kadivar, and Mostafa Moeen.

== Satire and journalism career ==
Nabavi started his satire career in the Soroush magazine in serial articles on cinema titled "andar hekāyat-e rešte va sar-r derāz va …" and continued it in the Gozaresh-e Film magazine (which he co-founded and worked as the magazine's first editor) with "rāport-hā" (reports). After leaving Gozaresh-e Film, Nabavi helped Kioumars Saberi Foumani start the Gol-Agha magazine, where he later wrote for.

While working at Gol-Agha, Nabavi started writing also for the Hamshahri monthly magazine, where he suggested establishing the Hamshahri daily newspaper, which later became very popular. Nabavi left the Hamshahri Institute three months after the resignation of Ahmad Sattari, the daily newspaper's then editor. After leaving Hamshahri, Nabavi found tried various random jobs, including designing crossword puzzles.

Nabavi later "escaped" to Isfahan in 1996, a reason for which he had mentioned the tighter restrictions on media imposed during the ministership of Ali Larijani and Mostafa Mirsalim in the Ministry of Culture and Islamic Guidance. In Isfahan, he later became active in the presidential campaign for Mohammad Khatami, after his election he moved back to Tehran. He later moved into self-imposed exile, settling in Belgium sometime in 2003 or 2004.

Nabavi became famous after starting his daily column sotūn-e panjom (Fifth column) in the newspaper Jame'eh, which he continued in several newspapers (under different variations of the title) after the newspapers were banned one after another. He also helped Fa'ezeh Hashemi in the founding of the newspaper Zan. In August 2009 he released the video "The Confession: Ebrahim Nabavi", where "dressed in striped pajamas and wearing bandages," he "confesses to meeting with a C.I.A. agent, importing green velvet, and having affairs with celebrities ranging from Marilyn Monroe and Sophia Loren to Carla Bruni and Scarlett Johansson" in a parody of defendant confessions at the 2009 election protesters show trial in Tehran. The video had over 120,000 viewings as of 10 February 2010.

He also wrote several books of satire, interviews, prison diaries, and research on the history of Iranian satire. By 2006 he was writing for the online newspaper Rooz and the BBC News in Persian.

Nabavi was arrested and jailed on two occasions for his political satire. During one of these periods of detention he wrote sālon-e šomāre-ye šeš (سالن شماره ۶; Corridor No 6), translated into French as Couloir n° 6 : Carnets de prison (ISBN 2-7427-5161-0).

== Death ==
On 15 January 2025, Nabavi died by suicide in Silver Spring, Maryland, United States, at the age of 66.

== See also ==
- Iranian stand-up comedy

== Sources ==
- Amiri, Noushabeh & and Nabavi, Seyyed Ebrahim (1999). یک گفت‌وگوی ساده (yek goftogū-ye sāde). In Nabavi, Seyyed Ebrahim, گفت‌وگوهای صریح (goftogūhā-ye sarih), pp. 13–52. Tehran, Iran: Rowzaneh. ISBN 964-334-017-1. (In Persian)
