= Rezazadeh (disambiguation) =

Hossein Rezazadeh (born 1978) is an Iranian politician and retired weightlifter.

Rezazadeh may also refer to:

- Rezazadeh Stadium, named after Hossein Rezazadeh
- Reza Zadeh, a Canadian-Iranian computer scientist
- Rezz, (born Isabelle Rezazadeh) Canadian musician
- Sholeh Rezazadeh (born 1989), Iranian-born Dutch writer and poet
