= Niknam =

Niknam is a surname. Notable people with the surname include:

- Ali Niknam (born 1982), Dutch entrepreneur
- Hossein Niknam (born 1951), Iranian fencer
- Sepanta Niknam (born c. 1985), Iranian politician
- Tyler Niknam (born 1990), known professionally as Trainwreckstv, American Twitch streamer and podcaster
