= Mezrab =

Mezrab (or mizrab) is a plectrum or lightweight hammer for various Iranian or Indian string instruments.

Mezrab may also refer to:

- Mezrab (Amsterdam), a cultural center in Amsterdam
- Mizrab (album), an album by Hungarian guitarist Gábor Szabó
