= Ahang Kowsar =

- آهنگ کوثر
- Born: 25 May 1936; Shiraz, Iran
- Died: 22 October 2024 (aged 88)
- Education: Oregon State University (BS, MS, PhD)
- Children: Nikahang Kowsar
- Awards: UNESCO Great Man-Made River International Water Prize

Ahang Kowsar (25 May 1936 – 22 October 2024) was an Iranian soil scientist and hydrologist who worked at the Agricultural Research, Education and Extension Organization. He began working on desertification control through floodwater spreading in 1972 and designed and constructed more than 15 floodwater-spreading systems in Iran. He is known for his work on desertification control, floodwater spreading, artificial groundwater recharge, and aquifer management. He was a critic of excessive dam building in Iran.

== Personal life ==
Kowsar was born in Shiraz on 25 May 1936. He received a B.S. in Soil Science from Oregon State University in 1966 and an M.S. in Soil Physics from the university in 1968. He received a Ph.D. in Soil–Plant–Water Relationships in 1977.

== Awards ==
Kowsar's work on desertification control and aquifer management received several national and international awards. In 1993, he received an award for the best watershed management paper for 1990 and 1991. He received a third-class research medal in 1996 and the second-degree award for applied research at the 10th Khwarizmi International Festival in 1997. On 5 February 1997, he received the World Intellectual Property Organization Gold Medal for his work on aquifer management. He received the National Environment Award in 2000 and the UN-Habitat award for the Gareh Bygone Plain project in 2004.

In 2005, Kowsar was awarded the UNESCO Great Man-Made River International Water Prize for his contributions to floodwater spreading and harvesting, groundwater recharge, and water-resource management in arid and semi-arid regions.

== Aquifer management in Iran ==
Due to Iran's arid climate and high evaporation rates, Kowsar advocated the use of underground aquifers as natural reservoirs for water storage. (coarse-grained aquifers). Kowsar and his colleagues proposed expanding aquifer-recharge systems to approximately 14 million hectares of suitable alluvial land in Iran. A 2010 report submitted by Iran to the United Nations Convention to Combat Desertification stated that such systems could potentially harvest approximately 42 km³ of floodwater annually.

The Gareh Bygone Plain project began in 1982 and used floodwater spreading for artificial groundwater recharge and irrigation of sandy rangeland. Since 1983, 193 million m³ of water has been supplied to communities in the area through floodwater spreading, with 76% of the water recharging the aquifer. The system was used across approximately 2,034 hectares of sandy rangeland. The project also contributed to the restoration of degraded rangeland by depositing sediment carried by floodwater and improving vegetation.

== Death ==
He died on 22 October 2024 at the age of 88.

== See also ==
- Aquifer storage and recovery
