= Sahand Sahebdivani =

Iranian-Dutch storyteller (born 1980)

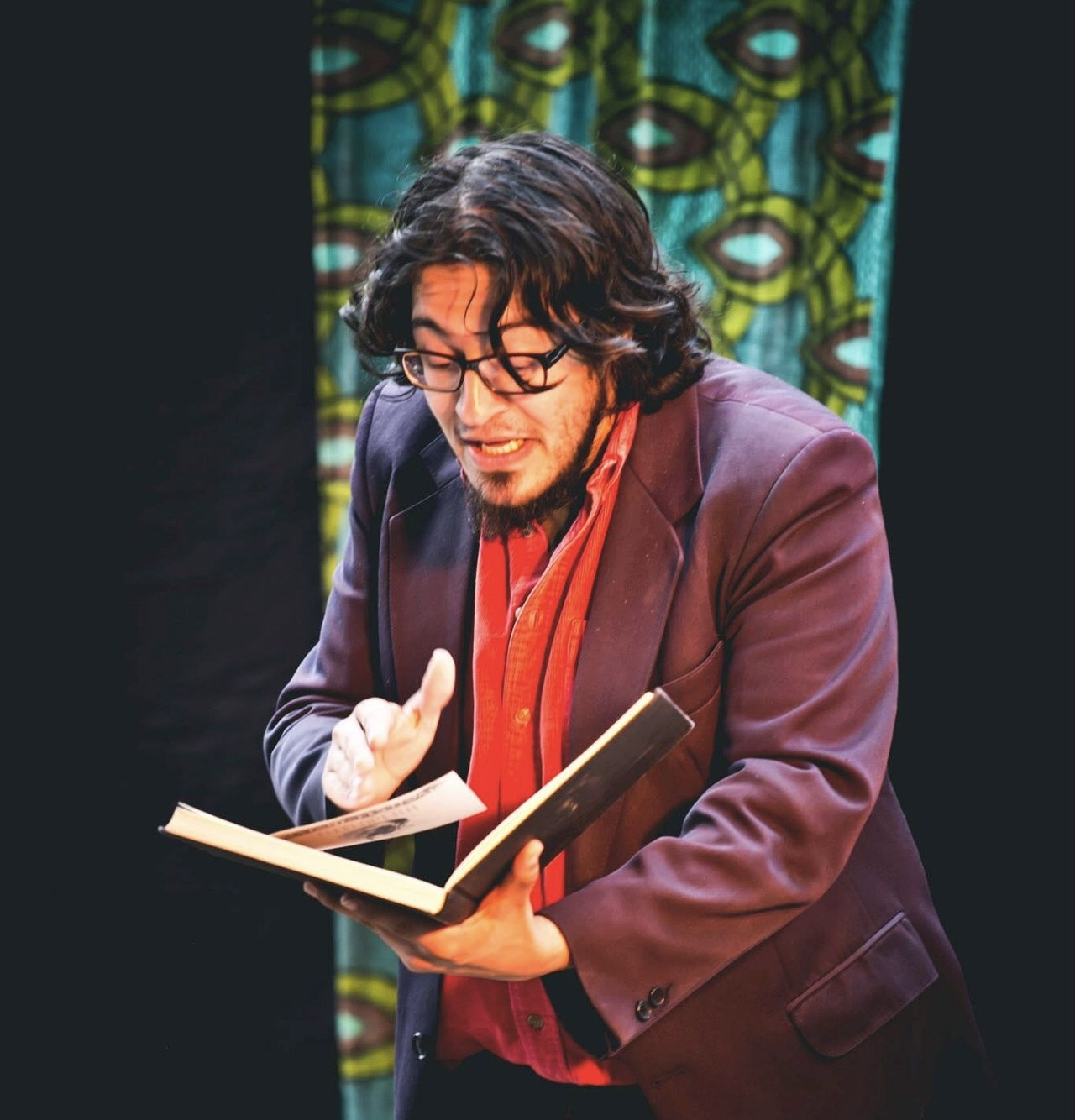
- Sahebdivani tells a story at the Jafani Festival 2014 in Rotterdam
- Born: 18 May 1980 (age 46); Tehran
- Occupations: Storyteller musician actor
- Years active: 1999–present
- Organization: Cultural center the Mezrab
- Partner: Rasha Hilwi
- Awards: Storyteller of the Year (2014); Amsterdam Fringe Gold Award (2017); Amsterdam Prize for the Arts (2020)
- Website: https://sahebdivani.com

Sahand Sahebdivani (born 18 May 1980 in Tehran) is an Iranian–Dutch storyteller, musician and founder of cultural center the Mezrab.

== Biography ==
After the Iranian Revolution, at the age of three Sahebdivani fled with his parents from Iran to the Netherlands in 1983. They were originally headed for Canada, but missed their transfer in Amsterdam, which is why the family ended up in the Netherlands. In his twenties he by chance got the opportunity to become storyteller at the Tropenmuseum, when another Iranian storyteller noticed his hat in the tram. He became motivated to continue his parents' Iranian tradition of storytelling and music making, which is why he founded the Mezrab in 2004. This started as a monthly gathering in a small teahouse, but within ten years grew into an established cultural center with a multidisciplinary programme of five days per week.

As his cultural center grew, so did his career as an artist. Together with various storytellers, actors and musicians he performs at theatres and festivals across the Netherlands and internationally. In 2014 he was chosen as the Netherlands' Best Storyteller of the Year. In 2017 together with storyteller Raphael Rodan he won the Amsterdam Fringe Gold Award for their play My Father Held a Gun. In 2020 Sahebdivani's cultural center won the Amsterdamprijs voor de Kunst (Amsterdam Prize for the Arts) for Best Achievements.

== Theatre ==
Sahebdivani played in among others the following plays and shows:

- 2012–2015: Kingdom of Fire and Clay
- 2016–2017: My Father Held a Gun
- 2018: In het Hol van de Leeuw
- 2019: De Ontheemden
- 2020: Sons of Abraham
- 2022: Stories of King Monkey
- 2022: Het verre woord
- 2023: Nachtreis

== See also ==
- Mezrab, the cultural center founded by Sahebdivani
- Storytelling
- Iranians in the Netherlands
