= Nikahang Kowsar =

Iranian-Canadian cartoonist

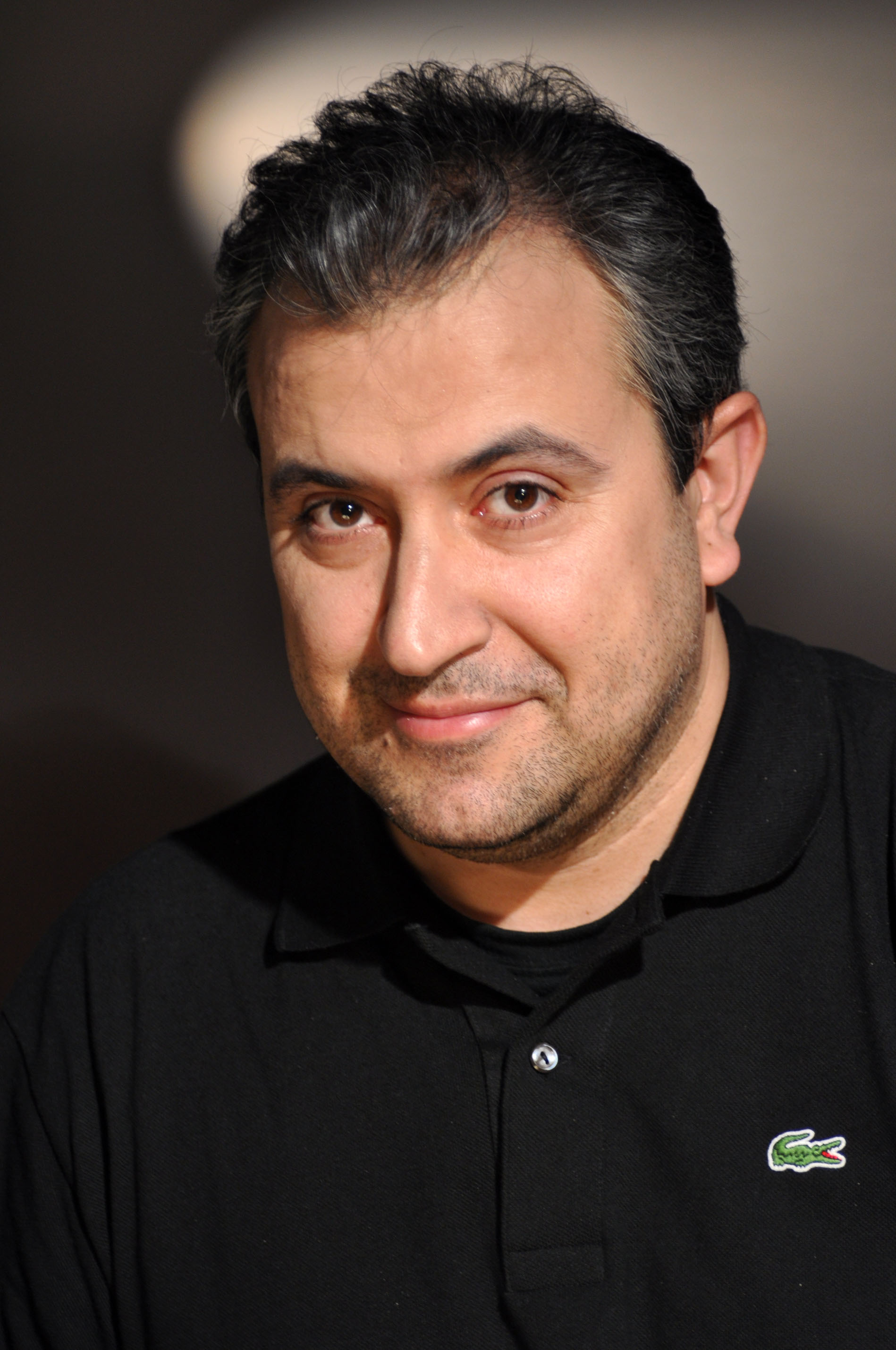
- Born: October 27, 1969 (age 57) Tehran, Iran
- Areas: Journalist, cartoonist, water issues analyst
- Pseudonym: Nik Kowsar
- Notable works: Crocodile Cartoon
- Relatives: Father: Ahang Kowsar

Nikahang Kowsar (Persian: نیک‌آهنگ کوثر; born 1969), is an Iranian-Canadian cartoonist, journalist, and blogger, currently living in Washington, D.C., US. Kowsar was also a reformist candidate for the second term of city council of Tehran in 2003, an election won by the conservative candidates of Abadgaran.

He studied Geology in the University of Tehran, and joined Gol-Agha, an Iranian political satire magazine as a cartoonist in 1991. He worked for Hamshahri from 1992 to 1998, and was a member of Newspapers such as "Zan", "Aftab-e Emrooz", "Sobh-e Emrooz", "Akhbar-e Eghtesadi", "Azad", "Bahar", "Bonyan", "Doran-e Emrooz", "Nosazi", "Hayate No", "Abrar-e Eghteadi", "Hambastegi", "Farhang-e Ashti". Most of these papers were banned by Saeed Mortazavi. He was arrested in Feb. 2000 for drawing a cartoon and spent 6 days at the Evin Prison in Tehran.

== Crocodile Cartoon ==
Ayatollah Mesbah Yazdi's nickname comes from a cartoon portraying "Professor Crocodile", a "reptilian academic who was shown strangling a journalist with his tail". The cartoon was drawn by Nikahang Kowsar and satirized freedom of expression in Iran, and a speech given by Mesbah Yazdi in the previous day. Mesbah Yazdi was known as Professor Mesbah (Persian: استاد مصباح) among his supporters. "Mesbah" rhymes with the Persian word for crocodile, "Temsah" (Persian: تمساح), and the cartoon labeled the crocodile as "Professor Temsah", who repeats the words used by Mesbah Yazdi in the previous day. Nikahang Kowsar was arrested and spent six days in prison for the depiction. In 2001, he sent an apology letter to Mesbah, and the cleric had said that he had accepted it, but later in 2003 Kowsar received a death threat, from and Islamist assassin group.

Kowsar is a Canadian Citizen.

In 2005, CBC's Farid Haerinejad made a documentary about Nikahang Kowsar entitled "The Bloggers' War". The film was the winner of Bronze Plaque from Christopher Columbus International Film and Video Festival Ohio.

Kowsar has been sentenced to prison for his cartoons in absentia. After moving to Canada, he worked in a Dry-Cleaner's for a while before joining MarketWire in 2005 and IFEX in 2008. He also has been free-lancing and his cartoons have been recently published by The New York Times, The Washington Post, The Globe and Mail, Maclean's, and The Guardian. Kowsar is a member of the New York Times Syndicate. He has appeared on CNN, BBC, CBC, CTV, VOA and many political TV shows as a guest analyst and observer. Kowsar now works in Washington DC and is the editor-in-chief of Khodnevis.org, the first Persian citizen journalism platform.

Kowsar is a member of the board of directors of Cartoonists Rights Network International.

Kowsar is also a member of the Association of Canadian Editorial Cartoonists (ACEC) and Journalists in Exile (JEX). CBC made a documentary based on his life and his involvement in the Blogger movement.

== Awards ==
Kowsar won the 2001 international "Courage for Editorial Cartooning" award from Cartoonists Rights Network International. He also received the second prize of Canada's National Press Club editorial cartoon contest in 2001. He has won 4 National Press Awards from Iran's "Press Festival" in 1996, 1999, 2000 and 2002. In 1995, he was a recipient of an Honorary Diploma from the International Caricature contests in Tolentino, Italy.

== Recent works ==
His cartoons are mainly published by Rooz online, a news website which is funded by a Dutch foundation. He now runs Khodnevis, a citizen journalism platform. He has been strongly criticized by supporters of the Iranian government, for his cartoons depicting Iran's involvement in Iraq, and possible war with the United States, as well as supporters of Iranian Reformists for criticizing former president Khatami and candidates like Mousavi and Karoubi. Kowsar has criticized the reformist leaders for not taking responsibility for their acts in the 1980s, during the Iran-Iraq war and mass-executions of political activists in Iran. The cartoons have been published by Rooz and khodnevis. He was forced to quit professional cartooning after being diagnosed with Fibromyalgia.

Kowsar who had written numerous Op-Eds on water management in Iran and criticized Khatami administration's water governance policies and warned the president in 2001 of a nationwide water crisis, started focusing on water issues in 2014, and launched the Abangan TV Show in 2015 to raise awareness of Iranians of a possible dire future.

He was quoted by Thomas Friedman on Iran's water situation: "When people lose their lands they lose everything, and that means they aren't scared of anything," explained Nikahang Kowsar, an Iranian exile geologist, and son of a watershed scientist, who grew up in southern Iran. "The water crisis is real and killing the country today. We are getting less precipitation, and the population is rising. There's bad agricultural policies and bad water governance. It is like a time bomb." Officials predict that millions of Iranians could be forced to flee their country before the end of the century."

== See also ==
- Iranian reformists
