= Mehdi Jami =

Iranian journalist

Mehdi Jami (born February 1961 in Mashhad) is an Iranian journalist.

Jami holds a master's degree in Persian language and literature from Ferdowsi University (1992). He is also a self taught photographer and filmmaker.

His research interests include Iranian Studies (his book on Iranian Ancient Literary History published in Tehran, 2000) and Islamic History (he has written for Islamica Encyclopedia, Leiden 2008) and also Persian culture in Central Asia (Tajikistan and Uzbekistan). His documentary film on Tajik music Falak was released in 2005. Jami is a member of Artists Without Frontiers.

From June 2006 to October 2008, he was the director of the Amsterdam-based Persian-language Radio Zamaneh which has been the first Persian media outlet based on the idea of Citizen Journalism.

He worked for BBC's Persian Service between May 1996 and May 2006. His Persian weblog "Sibestan" (first post: May 2003) is one of the most-read Persian weblogs.

== See also ==
- Persian culture
- Intellectual movements in Iran
