= Bunq =

Dutch financial technology company

bunq B.V.
- Type: Besloten vennootschap B.V.
- Industry: Financial technology
- Founded: 2012; 14 years ago
- Founder: Ali Niknam
- Headquarters: Amsterdam, Netherlands
- Area served: European Economic Area
- Products: Current accounts, Savings accounts, Debit cards, Mortgages
- Net income: 53,100,000 euro (2023)
- Total assets: Total risk weighted assets as of 2023 year end: Euro 986,016,000
- Number of employees: 427 (2024)
- Website: www.bunq.com

Bunq B.V. (English: /bʌŋk/, Dutch: [bʏŋk]; stylized in all lowercase), is a fintech and neobank licensed in the Netherlands and operating within 30 European countries. It is headquartered in Amsterdam.

The company was founded in 2012 by entrepreneur Ali Niknam, the founder of the web hosting provider TransIP and Team.Blue. Bunq offers both personal and business bank accounts, and a public API. In 2021, the company secured a record high Series A round giving it unicorn status. In 2022, it purchased Belgium-based fintech organisation Tricount, making it the second largest neobank in the European Union.

Bunq has been subject to scrutiny from customers, the press, and its own employees. It has also been subject to controversies and court cases over its anti-money laundering controls, employee access to data, and its contact with people who criticised the bank online or edited its Wikipedia page.

== History ==
=== Early history (2012–2015) ===
Bunq was founded by Ali Niknam in Amsterdam in 2012 as a fintech company. Niknam previously founded web hosting provider TransIP and Team.Blue. Much of Bunq's early efforts went toward obtaining a European banking license from De Nederlandsche Bank (DNB), the central bank of the Netherlands, which it received in 2014, becoming the first new bank in the Netherlands to do so in more than three decades. The company then launched its app, becoming the first fully mobile Dutch bank.

Niknam has stated in interviews that "Bunq is the only bank built by coders". This has resonated in Bunq's early public perception, as the bank was frequently labeled "an IT company with a banking license". At its launch in 2015, Bunq was coined "WhatsApp for Banking" by Dutch newspaper NRC, further underscoring its product and technology-focused model as opposed to traditional banks.

=== Growth and funding (2015–2024) ===
As of 2019, Bunq had been offering mobile financial services in 30 European countries. According to Bunq, in 2021, user deposits surpassed €1.2 billion, increasing to €4.5 billion by early 2024.

Bunq initially operated without external funding, but the company raised equity financing in 2021 with Pollen Street Capital acquiring a 10% stake while valuing the company at $1.9 billion. Niknam had entirely self-funded Bunq prior to the investment.

Bunq's CEO announced the creation of a special fund in March 2022, aiming to help refugees from Ukraine displaced by the Russian invasion of Ukraine to come to the Netherlands by providing them with free Bunq accounts. In May 2022, Bunq announced that they had acquired the Belgium-based fintech organisation Tricount.

In 2023, Bunq raised $111 million to support its expansion, including entry into the U.S. market, maintaining a valuation of €1.8 billion. It grew to become the largest neobank in Europe, serving more than 14.5 million customers worldwide. In 2024, it secured an additional $31 million in funding, attributed to growth in user deposits. The company offers different banking plans across EEA countries, with customer deposits protected by the Dutch Deposit Guarantee up to €100,000. Bunq's European user base reached 11 million by the end of 2023. In June 2024, it had reached 464 employees and 12.5 million customers.

=== International expansion (2024-present) ===
In 2024, Bunq withdrew its application for a U.S. banking license, after initially filing for regulatory approval.

In June 2026, Bunq applied for a banking license in Mexico.

== Products and services ==
In the early 2020s, Bunq began offering multiple currencies and multiple International Bank Account Numbers (IBAN) on a single subscription, regardless of the account holder's location or residency.

Bunq offers personal and business bank accounts and a public API that allows software developers to access their bank accounts programmatically and build their apps. By 2021, Bunq became the first digital bank in Europe to offer mortgages. As a licensed bank, Bunq account holders fall under the Deposit Guarantee Scheme.

In June 2024 the company entered partnerships with Mastercard and Nvidia, making it the first bank in Europe to use AI in open banking.

In 2025 the company partnered with US-based cryptocurrency exchange Kraken (legally named Payward, Inc.) to launch "bunq Crypto", allowing it's European users to buy and sell crypto.

== Regulations and anti-money laundering ==
In April 2021, Dutch consumer platform Kassa reported that Bunq had been used by criminals because the company wasn't requiring social security numbers and it wasn't using appropriate oversight for the creation of API keys. That same year, Bunq was fined €130,000 for failing to comply with terrorism financing regulations.

In October 2022, Bunq won a court case against the DNB. Bunq had taken the DNB to court over the central bank's anti–money laundering (AML) policies after the DNB alleged Bunq's transaction monitoring process did not comply with anti–money laundering laws. The court ruled in favor of Bunq using a learning system based on artificial intelligence as opposed to the rule-based system imposed by DNB.

De Nederlandsche Bank fined the company a further €2.6 million in 2025 for neglecting to implement proper anti–money laundering controls and oversight after several customers made suspicious money transfers.

== Controversies ==
=== Helpdesk fraud ===
In April 2024, Dutch consumer platform Kassa reported that customers who were scammed due to spoofing, phishing or bank helpdesk fraud could not get in touch with Bunq quickly. Kassa also reported that, due to Bunq's broader options for transferring money, it was far easier to lose large sums of money to fraud; a savings account with Bunq can be converted to bank account with a single tap, making it easier to transfer money away from a savings account. The Dutch Consumers' Association placed a safety warning on its savings account comparator website.

In May 2024, Dutch broadcasting company NOS and NRC, a Dutch newspaper, revealed that scammers had targeted Bunq customers more often when compared to other banks due to the fact that security measures used by other banks were not present at Bunq. Also in May, the Dutch consumer platform Radar reported a case where someone had lost €58,000 after falling victim to helpdesk fraud. The scammers requested over 80 debit cards without triggering any alarms within Bunq's system, resulting in the victim losing access to their Bunq account and their money. Bunq responded by saying that they would reimburse a large part of the damages out of goodwill, however they also mentioned that they were not directly responsible for the damages.

Following these reports, Bunq said that it would be introducing a 24-hour wait period for transactions deemed to be suspicious, including "changes to your daily limit, logging in on a new device, accepting an invite to a joint or shared account, making a payment to a new counterparty for the first time, or if the payment otherwise raised our suspicion and we’re taking the necessary steps to verify its legitimacy".

Initially, Bunq refused to compensate victims of the scams revealed by NOS and NRC, with Niknam stating that those who provided scammers with their login details had "giv[en] away their car keys," and that nothing could be done about it. Following talks with the Dutch Ministry of Finance, Bunq agreed to provide an average of 85% compensation to those affected, however this was also called into question when it was revealed that those with small claims had been offered 100% compensation, while those with large claims had not received an offer higher than 25%; the amount of lost funds suffered by individual customers ranged from €5,000 to €200,000.

Former employees of Bunq have criticized the company for prioritizing ease of access over safety features, as security features may annoy customers with delays in accessing accounts.

=== Privacy concerns ===
NRC reported that Bunq employees have easy access to customer data, which has been abused by some Bunq employees to view information related to their friends, acquaintances and colleagues. The newspaper spoke to four former employees that had wrongly accessed customer details for personal, rather than professional, reasons; one had done so to help their friends who had had troubles with customer service, another to see how much her colleagues earned, and two others to "spy" on their lovers.

The newspaper writes that when these issues were brought to the CEO, Ali Niknam, they were either dismissed or ignored. One of these internal documents was a risk assessment performed by the security department, which outlined three possible methods of privacy being breached, one of which was employees accessing customer data and the potential consequences, including fines and possible legal action against the company. Despite this risk assessment being dated in 2022, no internal monitoring of employee access to private information was implemented.

Managers attempted in 2021 to give certain departments greater access rights, while lessening the access rights of other departments due to security concerns. Although Niknam initially approved this measure, later that year it was reverted when employees complained that they couldn't view certain accounts. Bunq said that providing employees with broad access to customer data was justified because in addition to their normal roles, they require most employees to handle customer service inquiries which requires access to user data.

Customers and the media criticized Bunq in 2025 for a feature within its app that automatically shares information regarding stock and crypto currency transactions with everyone on the phone contact list of customers. The feature reveals various investment details and the dates of transactions. A spokesperson for the bank defended the feature and described it as "user friendly."

=== Efforts to silence critics ===
In 2024, Bunq faced controversy for contacting several users through their app after they criticized the bank online and made edits to the company's Wikipedia page. Bunq reportedly told the users to "moderate their tone" and that if they continued to criticize the bank, their "relationship would end." Bunq linked the identity of a Wikipedia editor to a customer who reinstated critical passages about the company on its Wikipedia page, a breach of consumer privacy. Bunq claimed this Wikipedia editor's story was "factually incorrect," yet refused to respond to any questions in detail from the Dutch newspaper Het Financieele Dagblad.

In October 2025, NRC reported Bunq has been trying to have a negative Reddit post, written by an alleged ex-employee, removed from the site. According to the newspaper, Bunq has been pressuring a group of Reddit moderators to remove the post, which was published in June 2024. After having filed an official complaint with the website in the summer of 2025, the head of legal affairs at Bunq spoke with the moderators in early September. The moderators repeatedly refused removal, stating that they had "not a single reason to do so." Later that month, the bank considered legal action to have the post removed. A Bunq spokesperson denied this occurred, but it was later reported the company had, indeed, discussed a "legal route."

== See also ==
- List of banks in the Netherlands
