= Farah Karimi =

Iranian-Dutch politician (born 1960)

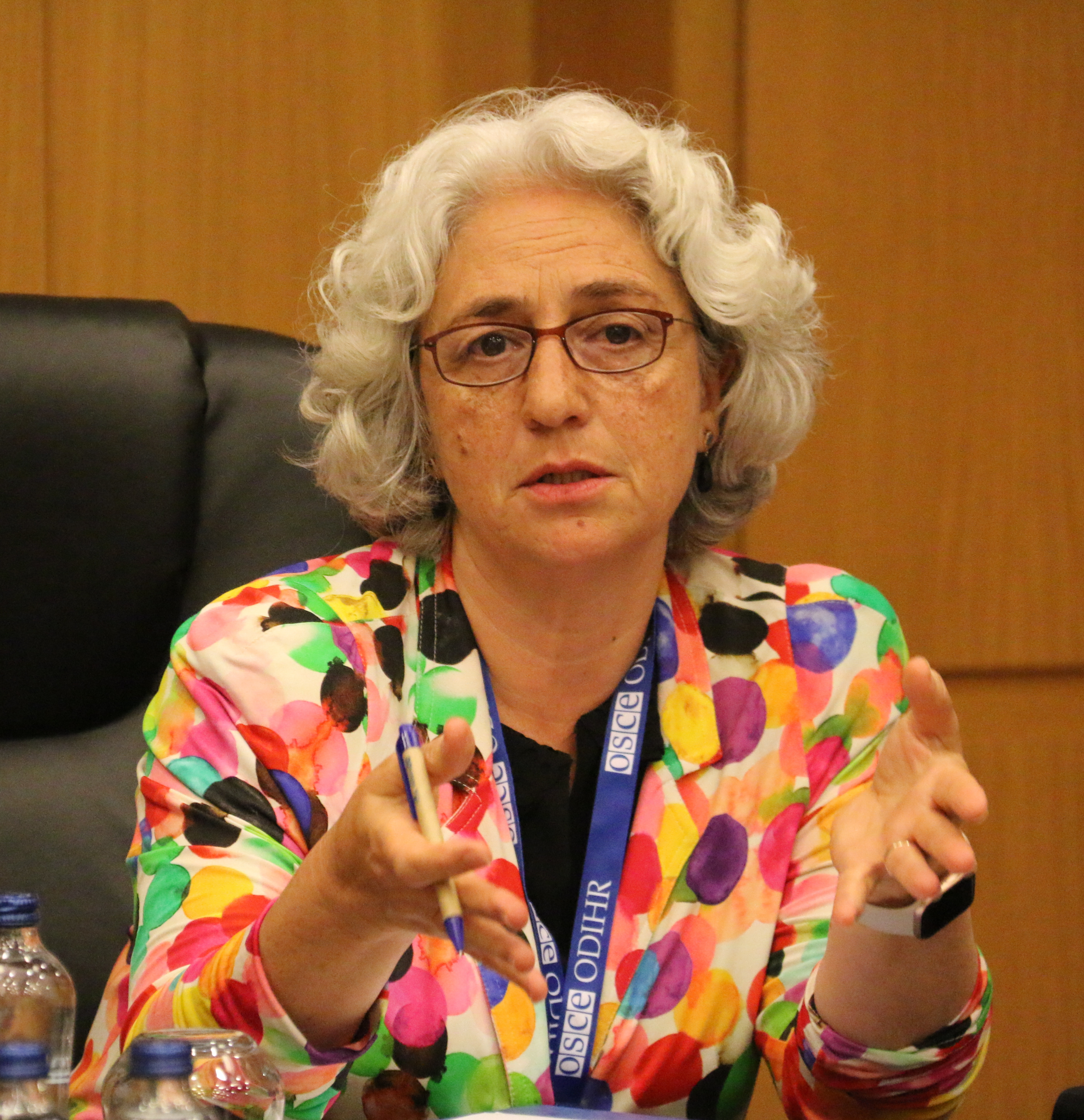

Member of the Senate
- Incumbent
- Assumed office 2 July 2019

Member of the House of Representatives
- In office 19 May 1998 – 30 November 2006

Personal details
- Born: 15 November 1960 (age 65) Yasukand, Iran
- Party: GreenLeft (1997–2026); PRO (since 2026)
- Other political affiliations: People's Mujahedin (1980–1986)
- Education: Isfahan University of Technology; University of Kiel; University of Groningen

Farahnaz "Farah" Karimi (Persian: فرح کريمی; born 15 November 1960) is an Iranian-Dutch politician. She was a member of the House of Representatives of the Netherlands between 1998 and 2006 for the GreenLeft party. Since 2019 she has been a senator for the GreenLeft party and since 2026 for Progressief Nederland (PRO).

== Early life and education ==
Karimi was born in Yasukand, Iran, in 1960. She received primary education and secondary education in Tehran, between 1966 and 1978. In 1978 she went to the Isfahan University of Technology to study industrial design. From the age of 15, Karimi became interested in progressive interpretations of Islam and in Ali Shariati. In her youth, Karimi was involved in the resistance against Shah Mohammed Reza Pahlavi and campaigned for democracy and human rights in Iran. Karimi saw the Iranian Revolution as a moment to put a form of Islamic socialism into practice. Instead, the Iranian revolution brought a conservative religious government into power.

In 1980, Karimi left the university to join the Mojahedin-e Khalgh, a left-Islamistic armed resistance movement against the Islamic Republic government.

In 1983 she fled from Iran to Germany, where she was granted political asylum.

In 1986 Karimi broke with the Mojahedin-e Khalgh. In her 2005 book The Secret of Fire Karimi describes her experiences with the Mojahedin-e Khalgh, and her break with the organization.

In Hamburg, Germany, Karimi attended a college for foreign students in 1985.

Between 1986 and 1988 mathematics and information science at University of Kiel. Between 1983 and 1988 Karimi was active in different refugee groups in Germany and France.

In 1989, Karimi went to the Netherlands with her family. At the University of Groningen, Karimi studied "International Relations and International Organizations". She also obtained the Dutch nationality.

== Career ==
In 1993, Karimi began to work in the semi-public sector. Between 1993 and 1994, she began to work for the foundation Probe in Hoogezand-Sappemeer. Since 1994, she worked as a coordinator for Aisa, a project for the emancipation and support of black, migrant and refugee women.

In 1997, she became a member of the GreenLeft party. In April 1998, she became a board member of GreenLeft.

In 1998 she was a national project leader for "Heel de Buurt" of the Dutch Institute for Care and Welfare. Karimi was also active in civil society. Between 1991 and 2001, she was a member of the Board of Vluchtelingenorganisaties Nederland.

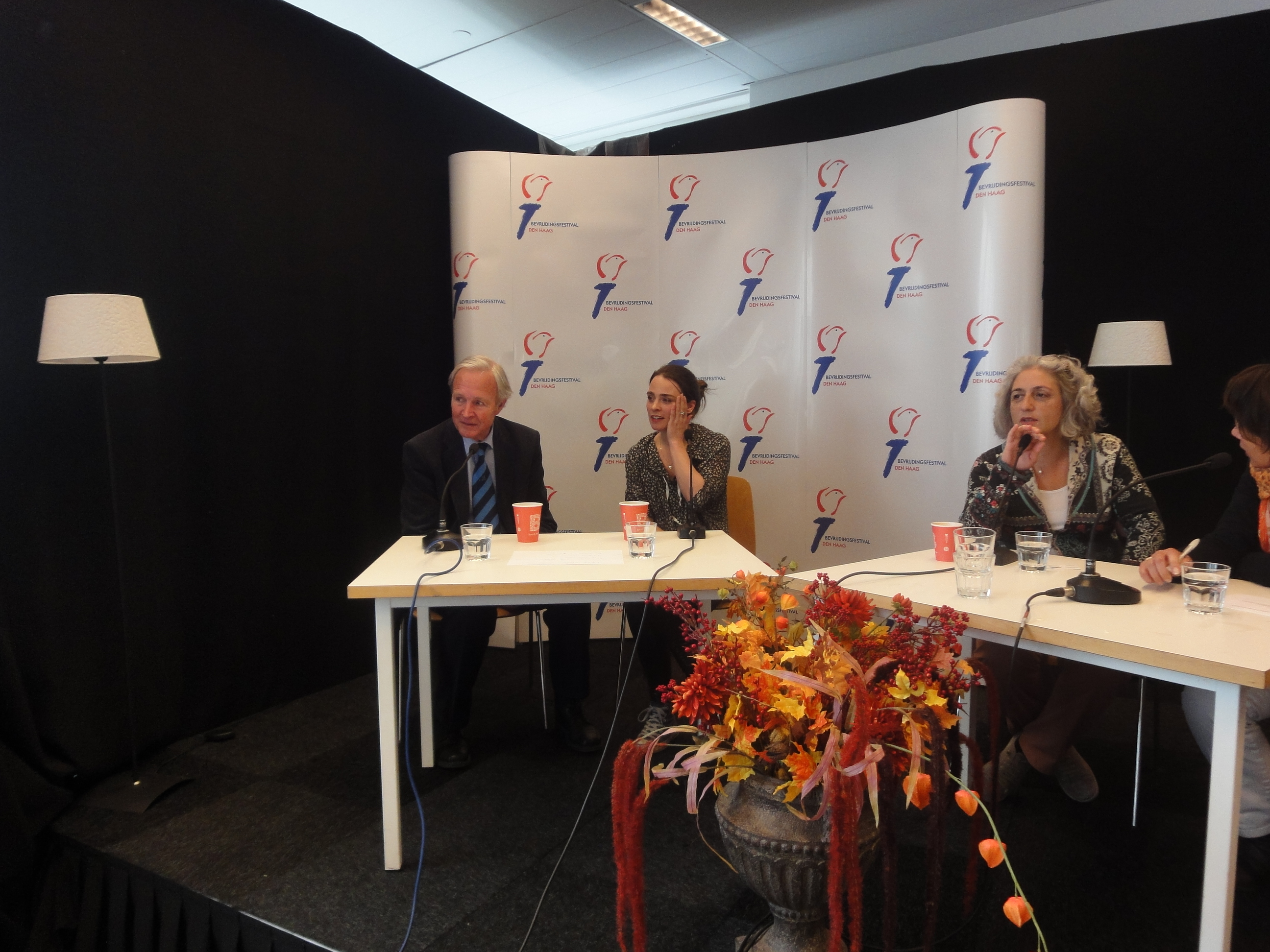
A debate led by Jan Terlouw

=== Political life ===
In the 1998 elections Karimi was elected to the House of Representatives for GreenLeft. In the House of Representatives, she was involved in the foreign affairs, development cooperation, European affairs and defense. As such, she was vice chair of the permanent committee for European Affairs. She also was a member of the committee for justice. In 1999 she was one of two MPs (the other one was Ineke van Gent) who voted in favour of a motion of Harry van Bommel to end the NATO bombings which were part of the Kosovo War.

In 2003, she proposed, together with Niesco Dubbelboer of the PvdA and Boris van der Ham of the D66, to hold a referendum on the Treaty establishing a Constitution for Europe. The proposal became law in 2005. She also questioned the Minister Jozias van Aartsen on the American Service-Members' Protection Act, which obliges the American government to free American citizens who are brought to the International Criminal Court in The Hague -even with the use of violence- and Minister Ben Bot on the Dutch support for the Iraq War. She also took the initiative to support free Iranian Media, Rooz and Radio Zamaneh, with 15 million euros. This was accepted by the House of Representatives at the end of 2004. Karimi did not put herself forward as a candidate in the 2006 elections.

Karimi was the executive director of Oxfam Novib until 2018. In 2009 and 2010 she chaired the SHO, a group of cooperating humanitarian aid organizations. She is also a board member of the broadcaster VPRO and the IDH (Dutch Sustainable Trade Initiative). Between 2006 and 2007 she served on the board of Parliamentarians for Global Action in New York. In 2007 she helped to establish the Afghan parliament as a consultant with the UN branch UNDP. As an administrator, she was involved with the advisory board of the International Institute for the Study of Islam in the Modern World, among other projects.

For her work, Karimi traveled extensively to conflict regions. In May 2005, she visited the opposition in Iran. She was interrogated at the Teheran airport and information was copied from her diary. This led to a formal protest by Minister Bot to the Iranian ambassador.

The main themes of her work in the House of Representatives were human right and international law in foreign relations of the Netherlands. She paid particular attention to the Israeli–Palestinian conflict and the developments in Afghanistan and Iran. She wrote about it in her books "Battlefield Afghanistan" and "The Secret of Fire".

=== Life after politics ===
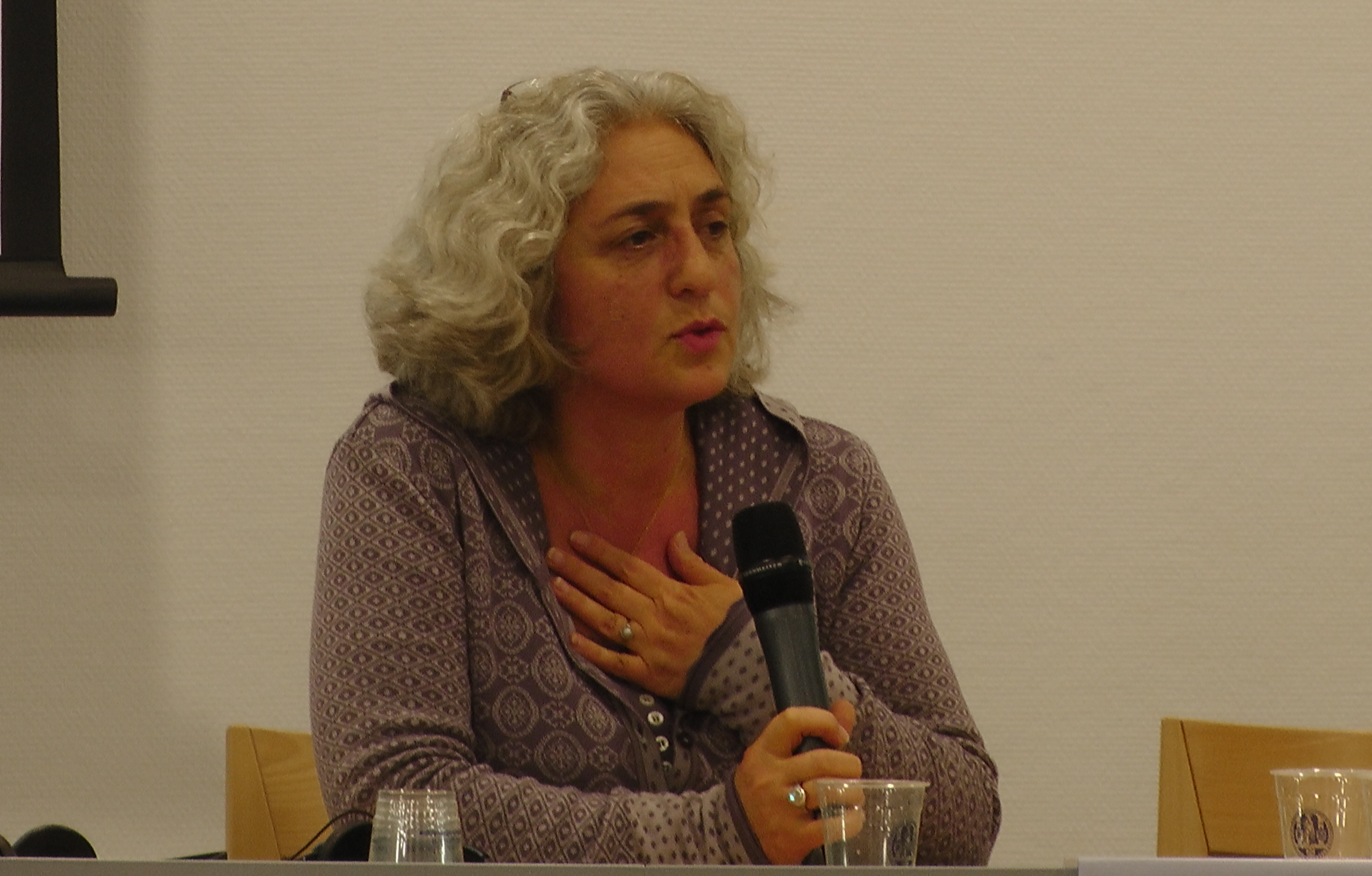
Farah Karimi giving a lecture at Leiden University, 2013

In early 2007, Karimi worked for the United Nations Development Programme, where she was a senior consultant for the UNDP in Afghanistan for project SEAL (Support to the Establishment of the Afghan Legislator). There she taught and supported different committees of the National Assembly of Afghanistan.

In November 2007 she was appointed general director of Oxfam Novib. She succeeded Sylvia Borren.

Karimi is also active in civil society. She writes for Rooz, a free, Persian online newspaper. Since 2004, she has been a member of the Board of Advice of the International Institute for the Study of Islam in the Modern World in Leiden. In 2006, she founded Bridging the Gulf, a foundation for human security in the Middle East]. Between 2006 and 2007, she was a member of the board of Parliamentarians for Global Action in New York.

== Personal life ==
Karimi has been married twice. Her first husband was also involved in the Mojahedin-e Khalgh. When she broke from the organization in 1986 she also broke with him.

She has one son with her first husband, who was born when Karimi fled from Iran. In 1989 she was married again. Karimi speaks Persian, Dutch, English, Turkish and German.

== Selected works ==
- Slagveld Afghanistan (El secreto del fuego: mi vida contra el fanatismo islámico/Battlefield Afghanistan) (2006) (Dutch, Spanish and English Edition) ISBN 978-8-467-02273-5
- Het geheim van het vuur (The Secret of Fire) (2005) together with Chris Keulemans
- In naam van de vrijheid: hoe onze wereld na 9/11 steeds onvrijer is geworden (In the name of freedom: how our world has become increasingly unfree after 9/11), 2021 (Dutch and English Edition) ISBN 978-9-046-82875-5

== See also ==
- Iranians in the Netherlands
- List of famous Iranian women
