= Farid Haerinejad =

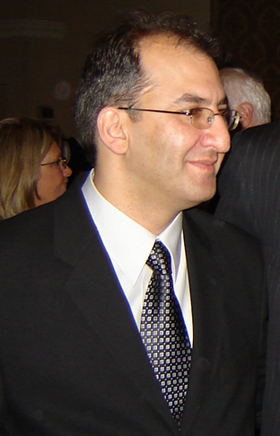
Farid Haerinejad

Farid Haerinejad (Persian: فرید حائری‌نژاد) is a documentary maker and blogger. He formerly worked with CBC and the Persian-language Radio Zamaneh in Amsterdam, Netherlands.

== Life and education ==
Farid Haerinejad was born in Tehran. He studied Russian language and literature in Baku's Education Institute and later in TV production and performance journalism at ICARI Institute, Montreal.

== Activities ==
Since 2000 to 2006 Haerinejad was a senior producer at Rodgers TV and since 2006 to 2009 a producer at Canadian Broadcasting Company (CBC) in Toronto.

In 2005, CBC's Farid Haerinejad made a documentary about Nikahang Kowsar entitled "The Bloggers' War". The film was the winner of Bronze Plaque from Christopher Columbus International Film and Video Festival Ohio.

In summer 2009 he was selected as the new editor-in-chief of Radio Zamaneh and moved from Toronto to Amsterdam. He was the editor of Radio Zamaneh for two years.

== Work ==
Human Rights issues has been the main theme of Farid Haerinejad's documentaries. He's autobiographical film "Out in Iran", is about the Iranian gay community, and "Women in Shroud" (made with M. R. Kazemi) pays attention to Iran's women situation and their efforts to have equal rights. The second one was shown at Amsterdam International Documentary Film Festival (IDFA) and also at Canadian Parliament and Dutch Embassies in various countries including Iran.
