= Mezrab (Amsterdam) =

Cultural center in Amsterdam

Coordinates: 52.3760°N 4.9276°E

- The House of Stories
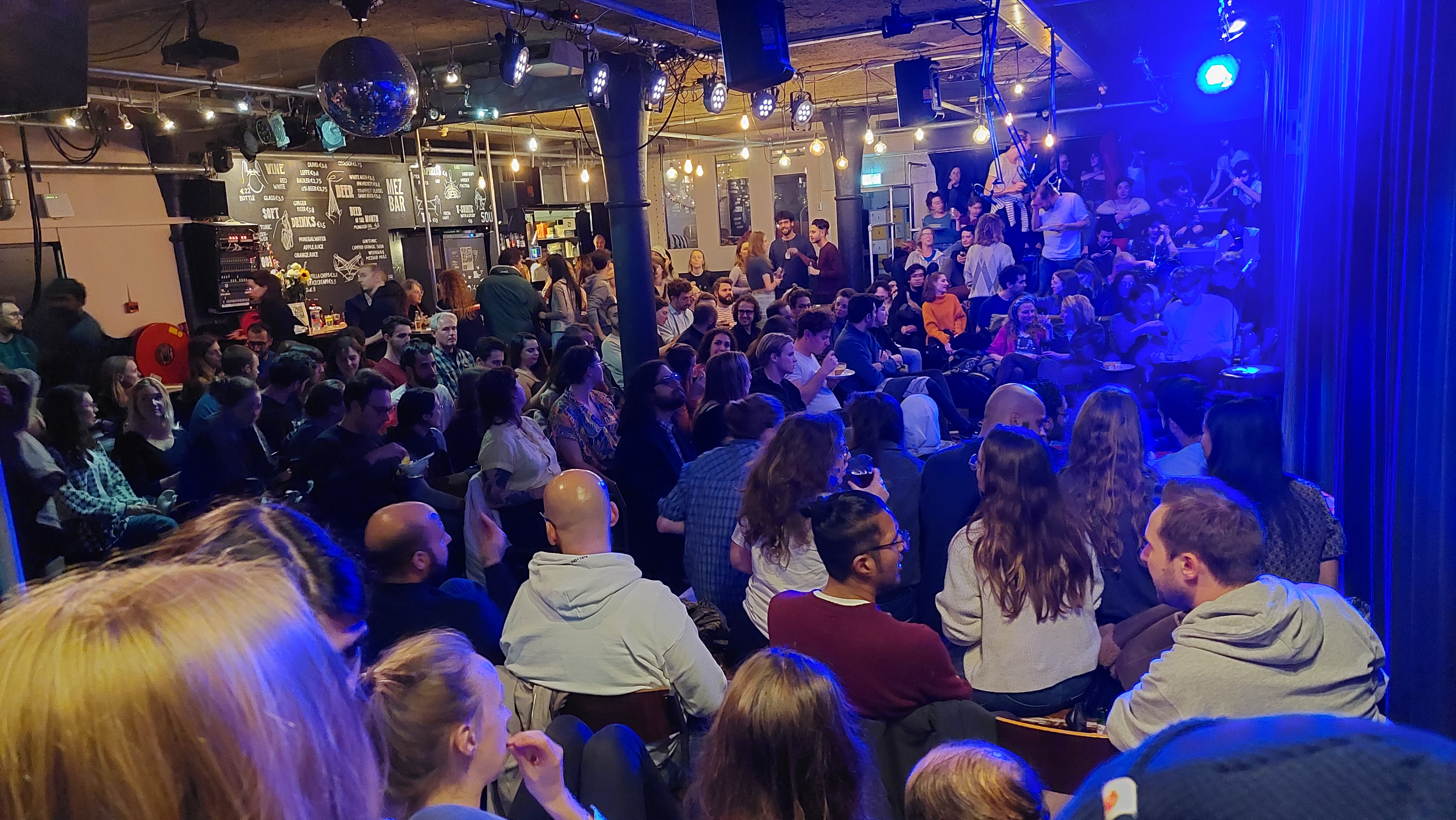
- Interior of the Mezrab
- Interactive map of Mezrab
- Address: Veemkade 576, 1019 BL; Amsterdam; The Netherlands
- Capacity: 230 visitors
- Events: Storytelling, Music, Poetry, Comedy, Dance

Construction
- Opened: 2004 (as a monthly gathering); 2014 (current location)

Website
- www.mezrab.nl

The Mezrab is a cultural center in Amsterdam focussed on storytelling and multidisciplinary performing arts. In 2020 the center won the Amsterdamprijs voor de Kunst for Best Achievements. Next to storytelling it is a podium for music, dance, comedy, and a storytelling school.

== History ==
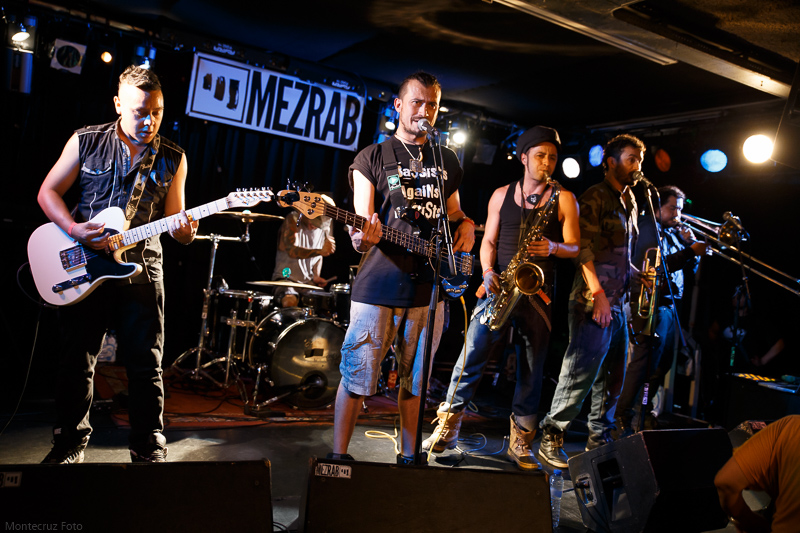
The band Skampida performing in the Mezrab.

The Mezrab was founded by storyteller and musician Sahand Sahebdivani in 2004. As an Iranian refugee he wanted to continue his parents' tradition of Iranian music and storytelling. It started as a gathering in the family's living room and grew into a monthly storytelling evening in a small tea house. Through the years the gatherings became more frequent and the Mezrab moved to various locations to keep up with its growth. In 2014, a crowdfunding was organized to move to the former location of music cafe Pakhuis Wilhelmina at the Veemkade, which has since become the fixed location for the center. In that same year the Mezrab Storytelling School was founded by Farnoosh Farnia and Raphael Rodan, and the team was expanded with Rogier Lammers as the music programmer and Karl Giesriegl as the creative director. Since then the Mezrab has a cultural program of over 300 events per year, with in addition to storytelling, music concerts, open mic evenings, dance, theatre and comedy. As most of its programming is in English, the center has become a popular destination for the international community of Amsterdam.

== Name ==
The cultural center is named after the Persian word for plectrum (see Mezrab (plectrum)), as it is 'a tiny thing that produces a big resonance'.

== Prizes ==
In 2020 the Mezrab won the Amsterdamprijs voor de Kunsten (Amsterdam Price for the Arts) for Best Achievements. The jury motivated their choice as follows:

"Mezrab is a unique cultural center for storytelling, a warm home for many Amsterdammers. It is a breeding ground where people come together to create, perform, tell, listen and engage within an open community. (..) Mezrab contributes to keeping the ancient art of storytelling alive in a contemporary and hybrid way. The jury is impressed by the accessibility and warmth of Mezrab as a cultural Foundation. Mezrab manages to create an international ambiance, in a local context. They organically create a sense of inclusivity, solidarity and involvement with its audience and the artists. The jury finds it inspiring how Mezrab has been making an authentic and colorful contribution to our city for years in a sustainable way."

== See also ==
- Storytelling
