= Sholeh Rezazadeh =

Iranian-born Dutch writer

- شعله رضازاده
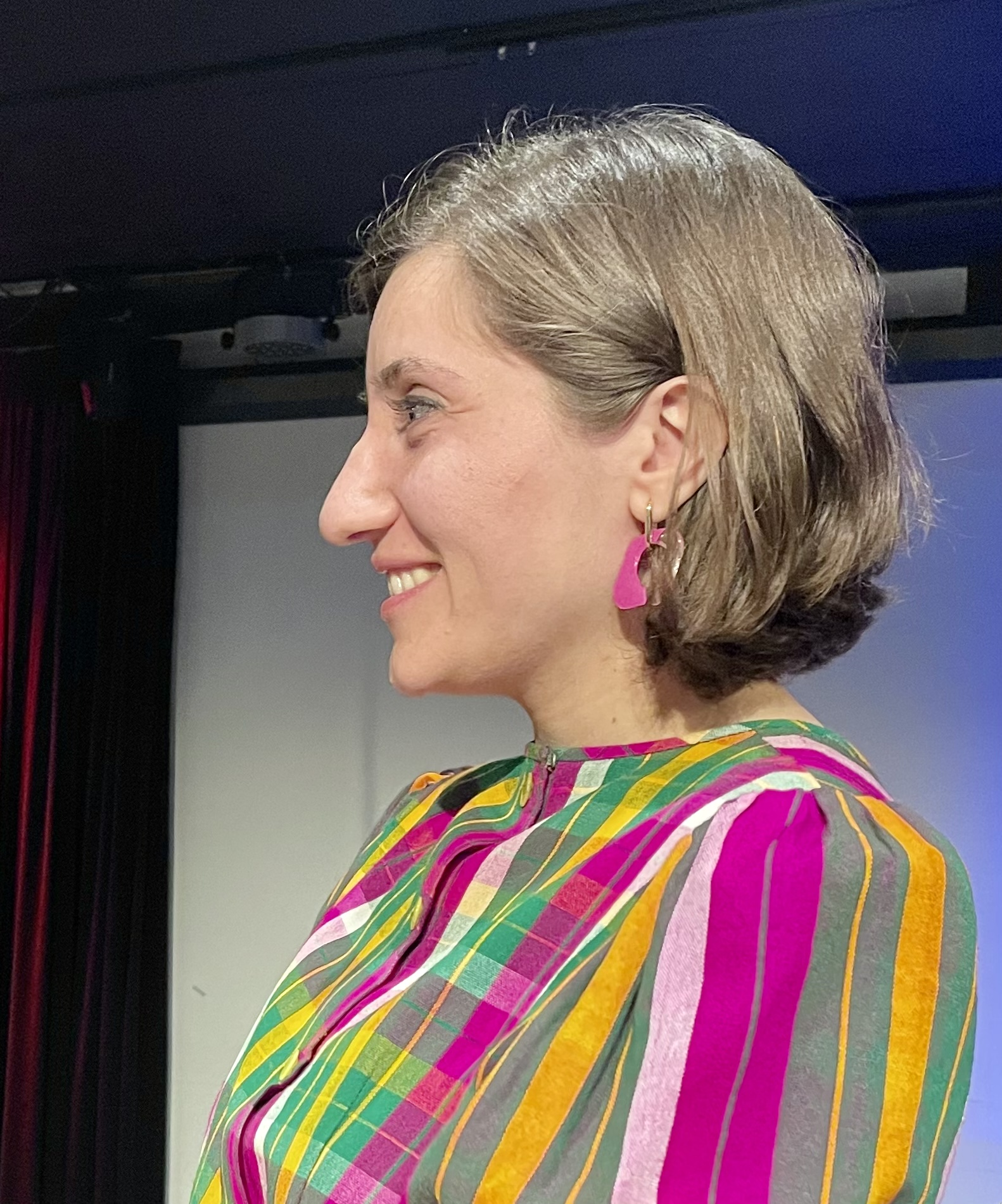
- Born: circa 1989 (age 36–37); Tabriz, East Azerbaijan province, Iran
- Occupations: Writer, poet
- Years active: 2012–present
- Notable work: "De Hemel is Altijd Paars" (2021)
- Website: Official website

Sholeh Rezazadeh (Persian: شعله رضازاده; born 1989 or 1990) is an Iranian-born Dutch writer. She writes poetry and prose, in both Dutch and Persian languages.

== Early life and education ==
Sholeh Rezazadeh was born in Iran in 1989 or 1990.

== Career ==
In 2015, Rezazadeh moved from Iran to the Netherlands for a relationship, and she quickly started learning the Dutch language.

She writes poetry and prose, in both Dutch and Persian languages.

In 2021, she released her debut novel in the Dutch language, De Hemel is Altijd Paars (English: The Sky is Always Purple). Her debut novel recounted the experiences of a young emigree from Iran whose father is addicted to opium, who struggles to adapt to life in the Netherlands. Her second Dutch novel is Ik Ken Een Berg Die Op Me Wacht (English: I Know a Mountain Waiting for Me) (2023). Rezazadeh also writes a column for the Dutch newspaper, Het Financieele Dagblad.

== Awards ==
Rezazadeh has been awarded the Agora Lettera (2018) writer's prize for prose; the El Hizjra literary prize (2019) for poetry; and the Debutantenprijs van de Maatschappij der Nederlandse Letterkunde (English: Debutant prize of the Society of Dutch Literature) (2022), formerly the Lucy B. en C.W. van der Hoogtprijs.

== Publications ==
- Rezazadeh, Sholeh (2021). De Hemel is Altijd Paars [The Sky is Always Purple] (in Dutch). Ambo/Anthos B.V. ISBN 9789026346125.
- Rezazadeh, Sholeh (2023). Ik Ken Een Berg Die Op Me Wacht [I Know a Mountain Waiting for Me] (in Dutch). Ambo/Anthos B.V. ISBN 9789026358692.
