= Gooya =

Persian-language website

Gooya (Persian: گویا) is a Persian-language website started by Belgium-based journalist Farshad Bayan in 1998.

At that time, there were a few Iran-related websites and most Persian media did not have online editions.

Gooya started its own independent news section, Gooya News, a few years later.
