= Ali Niknam =

Dutch entrepreneur

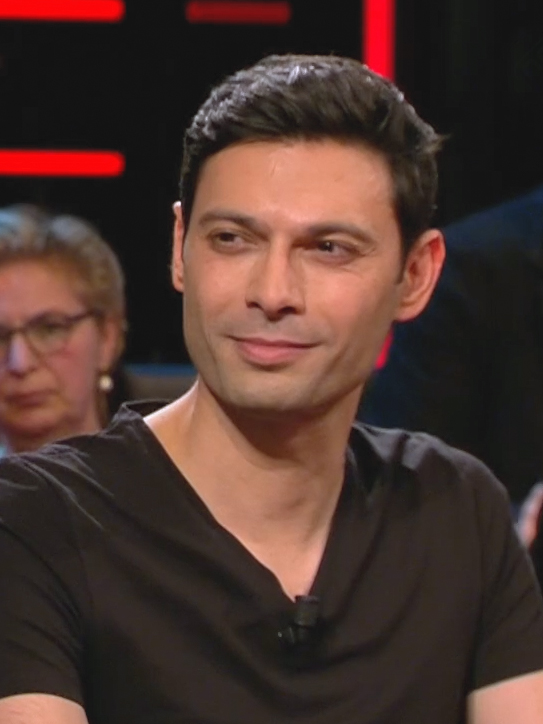
- Niknam in 2018
- Born: 12 December 1981 (age 44); Windsor, Ontario, Canada
- Occupation: Entrepreneur
- Known for: Founder of bunq

Ali Niknam (born December 12, 1981) is a Dutch entrepreneur, book author, founder of TransIP, CEO and founder of bunq.

In 2022, he gained public attention for leading bunq in a landmark legal battle against the Dutch Central Bank over the use of artificial intelligence in anti-money laundering compliance.

== Biography ==
Ali Niknam was born in an Iranian family on December 12, 1981, in Windsor, Ontario, Canada. When he was 7 years old, the family moved to Gouda, Netherlands. He graduated from secondary school at the Coornhert Gymnasium in Gouda and in 2007 received a bachelor's degree in technical informatics from the Delft University of Technology.

In 2003, during university years, Niknam founded TransIP, a company that specialized in domain name registration and web hosting. In 2014, he handed over the management of the company and in 2019, after the merging with the Belgian company Combell, TransIP was renamed team.blue where he remained a board member. In 2007, with his two partners, he founded a data center company The Datacenter Group. As of 2018 he remained a shareholder in the company at least.

In 2011, Niknam wrote a book called Ondernemers hebben nooit geluk (Entrepreneurs are never lucky) covering his entrepreneurship experience.

In 2022, together with Robert Vis and Joris Beckers, he founded the People for People Foundation, which supported people affected by the Russian-Ukrainian war. Together, the three men donate €500,000 per year.

== bunq ==
In 2012, Niknam launched a mobile bank named bunq in which he invested €98.7 million. In May 2022, bunq announced that they had acquired the Belgium-based fintech organisation Tricount, which Niknam stated aligns with the values of bunq. This acquisition saw Niknam's bank become the second largest neobank in the European Union.

In October 2022, Niknam led the neobank in a legal dispute against the Dutch Central Bank (DNB) concerning the use of artificial intelligence (AI) in anti-money laundering (AML) compliance. The DNB had prohibited bunq from employing AI-driven methods for customer screening, asserting that such practices did not align with existing AML regulations. Challenging this stance, bunq argued that AI and machine learning technologies could enhance the effectiveness of AML measures.

The Dutch court ruled in favor of bunq, concluding that the Dutch Central Bank had not sufficiently demonstrated that bunq's methodologies were non-compliant with AML laws. The court also stated that bunq needed to improve its procedures for verifying customers' sources of income, particularly for politically exposed persons. Following the ruling, Niknam referred to the case as significant for the broader neobank sector.

In 2023, bunq was valued at €1.65bn after a new funding round. In 2025, bunq surpassed the threshold of twenty million European users, doubling its user base within two years. In October of the same year, bunq obtained a so-called broker-dealer license from U.S. authorities. This enabled customers to invest in U.S. equities, investment funds, and ETFs. Niknam described the license as a milestone.
