= Radio Zamaneh =

Amsterdam-based Persian language exile news platform

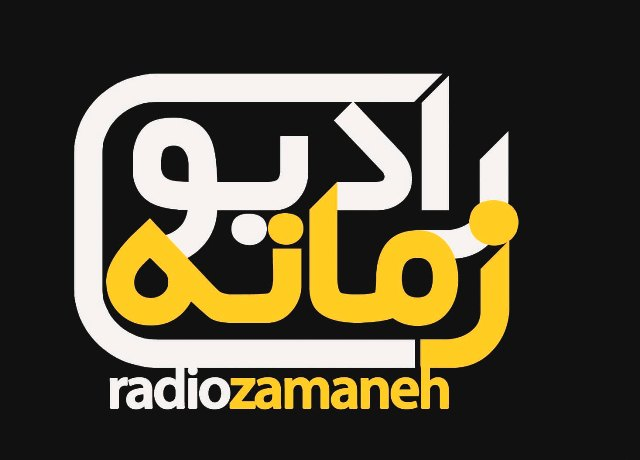
- Logo of Radio Zamaneh

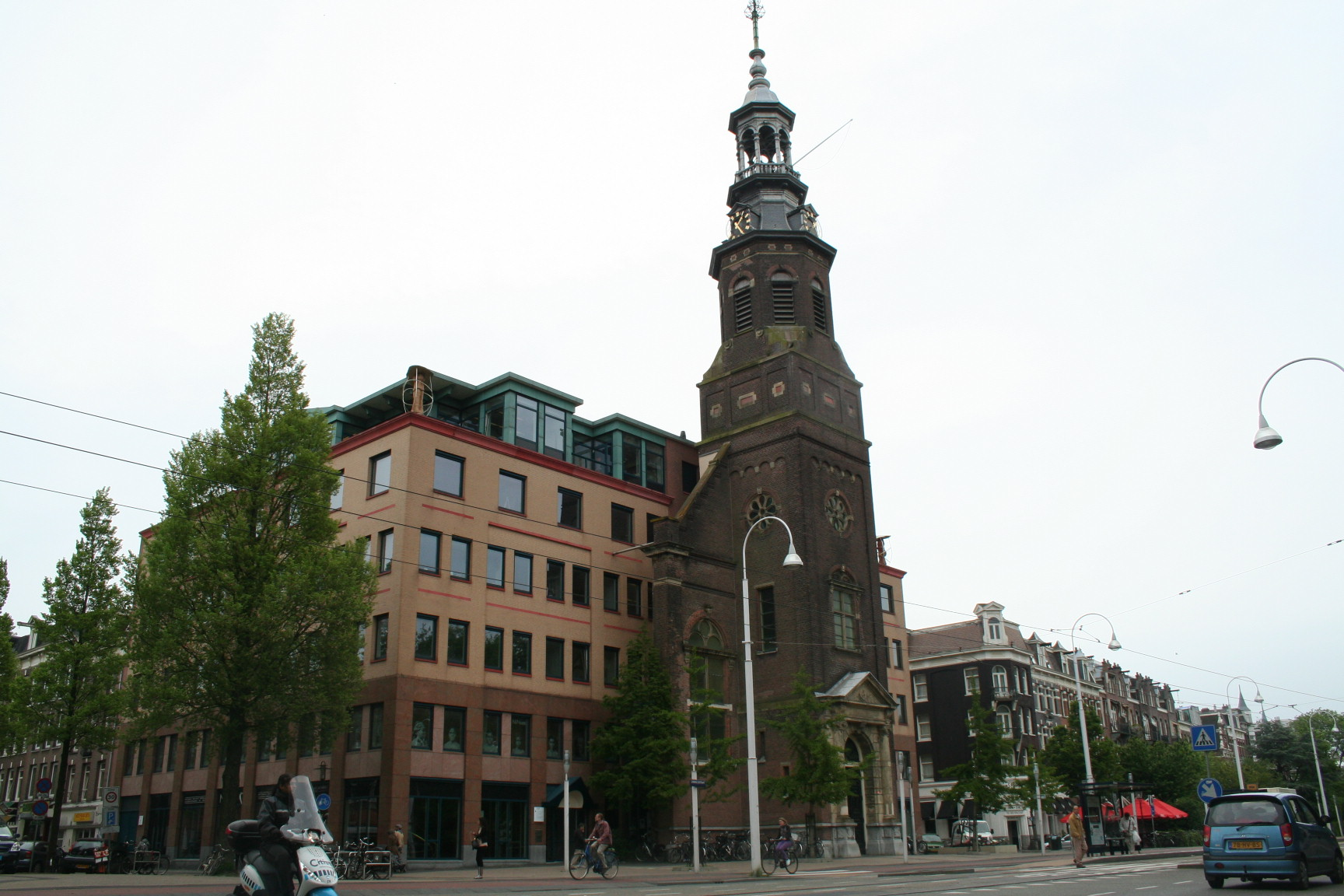
- Radio Zamaneh offices in Amsterdam, 2010
- Type: Public radio network
- Country: The Netherlands
- First air date: August 2006
- Availability: Global
- Founded: 2005
- Headquarters: Amsterdam, NH
- Broadcast area: Iran, International
- Owner: Radio Zamaneh Foundation
- Key people: Nasim Roshanaei, Editor-in-chief; Rieneke Van Santen, Executive director
- Established: 2006
- Launch date: August 2006
- Official website: radiozamaneh.com
- Language: Persian & English

Radio Zamaneh (Persian: رادیو زمانه) is an Amsterdam-based leftist Persian language exile news platform and former radio broadcaster. "Zamaneh" is the Persian literary term for "time".

Radio Zamaneh is an independent Persian-language exile media and former radio broadcaster that was founded in 2005, after the parliament of the Netherlands passed a resolution calling for support to free Iranian media. Radio Zamaneh is the recipient of various Human Rights and Press Freedom grants, with the Dutch Ministry of Foreign Affairs and the European Union being amongst the major contributors. The broadcaster's content is provided by Radio Zamaneh's Persian-speaking, almost all Iranian editorial staff and contributors. Radio Zamaneh is an independent broadcasting organization, registered as a non-profit organization in the Netherlands, with its headquarters and studio in Amsterdam.

Radio Zamaneh—criticized as a leftist outlet with anti-Western biases—often criticizes NATO, the United States, and Israel. It has also been seen as pro-Russian. Its founder, Farah Karimi, is a member of the Dutch Parliament and a former member of the MEK, and the last editor-in-chief until 2023, Mohammad Reza Nikfar, is a former member of the OIPFG. Iman Ganji, the editor-in-chief of Radio Zamaneh from October 2023 to September 2024, has criticized the policies of Western countries and especially Israel as a racist, colonialist, genocidal and apartheid country.

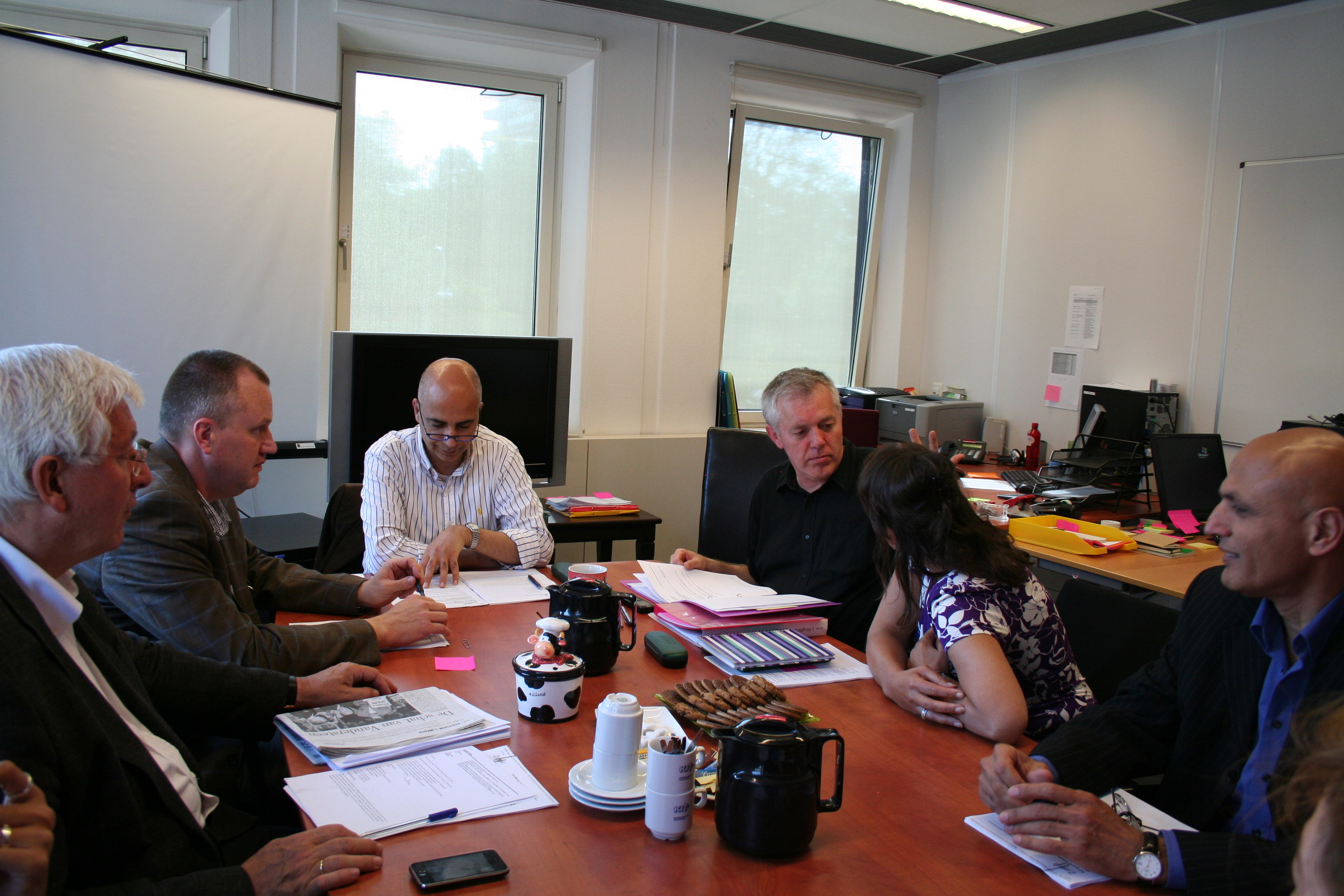
One of the board meetings of Radio Zamaneh in Amsterdam, 2009

== History ==
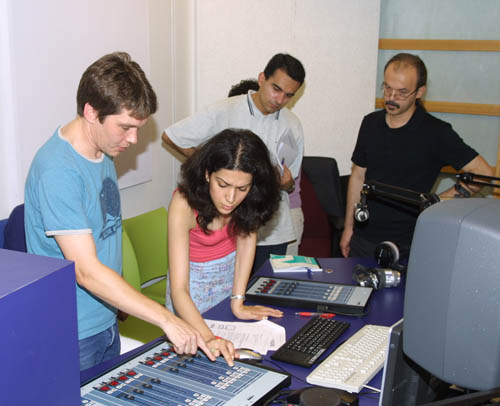
A Scene from Radio Zamaneh Workshop in Amsterdam, Summer 2006

In 2003, the Dutch parliament planned to establish a Persian-language television station in the Netherlands and halted the project after negative reactions from the Iranian government. Proposals were put forward for promoting independent journalism in Iran, and eventually the budget was divided among a number of projects, with Radio Zamaneh and Shahrzad News receiving the bulk of the funding.

In 2006, after three years of negotiations, the Radio Zamaneh board selected London-based Persian journalist and radio producer Mehdi Jami as the director of Radio Zamaneh. Jami moved to Amsterdam, where he held a workshop to initiate Radio Zamaneh's activities inviting more than 30 Iranian writers, journalists and bloggers from around the world. Shahrokh Golestan, Abbas Maroufi, Mohammad-Reza Nikfar, Jamshid Barzegar, Nikahang Kowsar and Behzad Bolour were among them. After a 5-day workshop, Radio Zamaneh released a statement calling itself the "Voice of Persian Bloggers".

Farah Karimi, former Dutch MP, at RZ Workshop.

Internet broadcasting started on 4 August 2006 while satellite broadcasting started on 7 September. Short-wave broadcasting started in September 2006 and stopped in January 2008.

A few days before starting the programs, Radio Zamaneh broadcast Iranian underground music. This act was warmly received by underground musicians in Tehran, but also criticized by many in the target audience because of the harsh language used in many of the songs. RZ gradually divided its musical broadcasts into "Persian Classical", "Persian Symphonic", "Persian Folk", "New Voices", "Western Classical", "Film Music" and "World Music".

Jami was the director until October 2008. Persian-born Dutch politician and MP, Farah Karimi, was among the founding members of the media. After Jami, from November 2008 until July 2009, Zoran Djukanovic, who is program coordinator of Radio Zamaneh at Press Now, was the Interim Director, with Hossein Alavi as Interim Editor-in-Chief. In July 2009, Farid Haerinejad and Ruth Kronenburg joined Radio Zamaneh as the new Editor-in-Chief and Director of the organization. Since January 2019, Joris van Duijne is the executive director. Mohammad-Reza Nikfar is Radio Zamaneh's chief-editor. Mohammad Reza Nikfar was the editor-in-chief of Radio Zamaneh until July 2023. Iman Ganji succeeded him as editor-in-chief in October 2023. After Ganji's resignation in September 2024, Zamaneh was managed by an editorial board for less than a year, and Nasim Roshanaei was appointed as the new editor-in-chief in October 2025. Since February 2010, Arjen de Wolff, has been managing the foundation for 5 years. After him, Rieneke Van Santen and Joris van Duijne have been managing Zamaneh. The director of Zamaneh has been Rieneke Van Santen since the beginning of 2025. This is her second appointment to this position.

== Broadcasts ==
Radio Zamaneh broadcasts 24 hours on its satellite channel. The daily programs are also available online on Radio Zamaneh's website. The core of its current affairs and cultural, social and economic program is broadcast 1.5 hours a day through internet and satellite. Daily broadcasts start at 18:00 Amsterdam time (20:30 Tehran time) and will be repeated 4 times.

Radio Zamaneh broadcasts in Persian via satellite and the internet. The programs contain general news and bulletins, philosophical, social and cultural topics and issues, with special attention for free thought, critical thinking, arts and culture, women's rights, LGBT and minorities. Radio Zamaneh is an alternative voice in the foreign-based Iranian media-landscape, focusing on taboo and using humor and satire as a frequent tool.

Radio Zamaneh develops and provides e-learning on various topics related to journalism, democracy and human rights, and international relations, in Persian, to an Iran-based audience.

The broadcaster produces and supports documentary films. Two new documentaries, one torture-victims and one on the position of LGBTI-individuals in Iran, are set to be released in 2013.

Radio Zamaneh is engaged in advocacy for Iranian media development and to promote access to information for Iranians by speaking out and actively countering satellite jamming and online censorship.

Radio Zamaneh operates a 24-hour radio channel, a Persian-language news and current affairs website, an English-language summary website, a secure e-learning environment and Tribune Zamaneh, a platform for citizen reporters and e-learning journalism students.

Radio Zamaneh was among a list of foreign organizations, including media outlets and human rights groups, which Iran's Intelligence Ministry placed on a blacklist over their alleged role in fomenting the unrest that followed the disputed presidential election in June 2009.

== Hacking and other cyber attacks ==
In January 2010, hackers calling themselves the Iranian Cyber Army hijacked the website of Radio Zamaneh, several weeks after doing the same to China's Baidu Inc search engine and Twitter.

According to Reuters: "Since early Saturday [30 January 2010], visitors to the website of Dutch government-funded Radio Zamaneh, which reports on human rights and unrest in Iran, have seen the message "this web site has been hacked by Iranian Cyber Army" followed by a warning in Persian: "Iranian Cyber Army warns all treasonous mercenaries that it will not leave them at peace even in the bosom of their masters."

The problem was solved after three days.

Attempts to hack and Ddos-attack Radio Zamaneh's websites and systems have since remained frequent, with a sharp increase of malicious activity since early 2012.

== Organizing and support ==
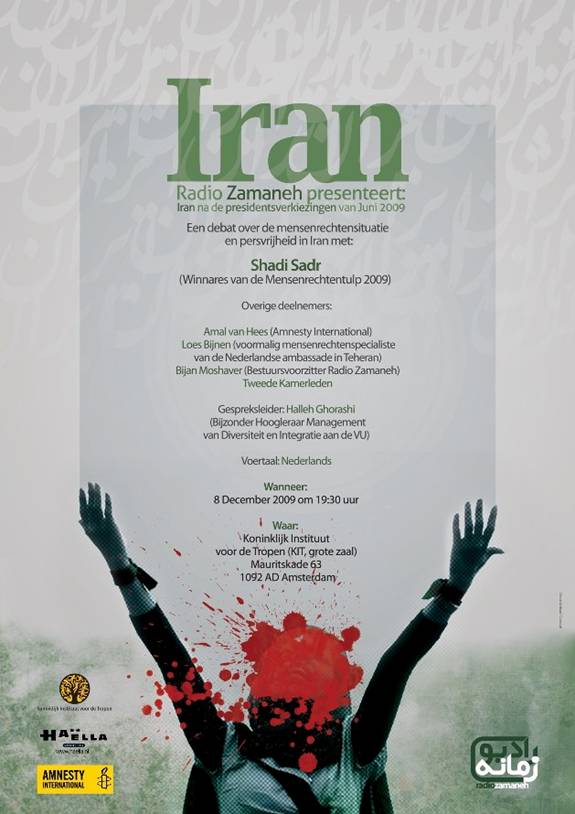
Human Rights and Freedom of Speech Conference, organized by Radio Zamaneh, Tropenmuseum Grand Hall, Amsterdam, December 2009

Since 2006 to 2010 Radio Zamaneh has supported various cultural and human rights projects such as Iranian underground music Festival in Zaandam (2006), Tehran section of Rotterdam Film Festival in Rotterdam (2007), Noor Iranian Film Festival (2008), The documentary "Hayedeh: Legendary Persian Diva" (2009), European tour of Kiosk Band (2010), etc.

In December 2009 Radio Zamaneh organized a conference about "Human Rights and Press Freedom in Iran" at Amsterdam's Tropical Theatre. The women rights activist Shadi Sadr gave a lecture in this conference.

In November 2012, Radio Zamaneh hosted a conference in Amsterdam on the future role of media and online activism in Iran. Nobel Prize Laureate Shirin Ebadi was one of the keynote-speakers.
