= The Daily Show: Indecision =

The Daily Show: Indecision is a series of features on The Daily Show with Jon Stewart spoofing US elections.

It may refer to:

- The Daily Show: Indecision 2000
- The Daily Show: Indecision 2004
- The Daily Show: Indecision 2006
- The Daily Show: Indecision 2008

== See also ==
- Comedy Central's Indecision (disambiguation)
