= Comedy Central's Indecision =

Comedy Central's Indecision is a series of features on Comedy Central spoofing US elections.

It may refer to:

- Comedy Central's Indecision 2000
- Comedy Central's Indecision 2008

== See also ==
- The Daily Show: Indecision (disambiguation)
