= Stephen Colbert 2008 presidential campaign =

American satirical political campaign

Stephen Colbert for President 2008
- Campaign: 2008 U.S. presidential election
- Candidate: Stephen Colbert
- Affiliation: None
- Headquarters: None
- Receipts: (None)
- Slogan(s): First to secede, first to succeed!

Website
- www.colbert08.org

On October 16, 2007, satirist Stephen Colbert (in the guise of his character) officially announced that he would run for President of the United States. This came after weeks of being pressured to do so by the public and stating that he would need a sign, which came from Aragorn (Viggo Mortensen) giving him the sword Anduril. Although the legitimacy of his campaign was questioned, he maintained that he was serious. Colbert had originally planned to run for both the Republican and the Democratic nomination in his home state of South Carolina. After learning that the fee to file for the Republican primary was $35,000, he abandoned plans to run as a Republican (he had previously stated that he could avoid FEC rules if he stayed under $5,000 in campaign expenditure). Although he paid the $2,500 fee to be included in the South Carolina Democratic ballot, he was denied a place on the ballot by the South Carolina Democratic Party executive council. On November 5, 2007, Colbert officially dropped his presidential bid.

== Campaign ==
=== Timeline ===
In the week prior to announcing his candidacy, Colbert appeared on a number of talk shows to promote his book I Am America (And So Can You). During these interviews, he parodied potential candidates' standard approach to a White House run, giving broad and generally unprompted hints towards a campaign on shows like Larry King Live. "A lot of people see this book as testing the waters for a run for political office," he told King in an October 14, 2007 interview. On the same day, Colbert took over The New York Times opinion columnist Maureen Dowd's column, which he used to engage in similar speculation: "I know why you want me to run, and I hear your clamor ... Nevertheless, I am not ready to announce yet – even though it's clear that the voters are desperate for a white, male, middle-aged, Jesus-trumpeting alternative."

The campaign began in earnest on October 16, 2007, when Colbert officially announced his candidacy on his own 11:30 pm–12:00 am EST Comedy Central program, The Colbert Report. Colbert had earlier appeared on The Daily Show, the program immediately preceding his own on the Comedy Central lineup, but had stated that his final declaration of candidacy would be made on a "more prestigious show". Subsequent to his declaration, Colbert appeared on Meet the Press on October 21, 2007, where he asserted the reality of his campaign: "I'm far realer than Sam Brownback, let me put it that way," said Colbert.

Colbert's campaign touted him as South Carolina's native or favorite son candidate, running exclusively in that state and exclusively for that state's interests. "I am from South Carolina and I am for South Carolina and I defy any other candidate to pander more to the people of South Carolina, those beautiful, beautiful people," he said after his Colbert Report announcement. As such, he challenged Democratic candidate John Edwards'—himself a native South Carolinian—own prospective role. As Colbert began campaigning in South Carolina in late October, Edwards' spokesperson Teresa Wells teased Colbert about his sponsorship by Doritos nacho chips: "As the candidate of Doritos, his hands are stained by corporate corruption and nacho cheese. John Edwards has never taken a dime from taco chip lobbyists and America deserves a President who isn't in the pocket of the snack food special interests." The Edwards team also released a press release responding to Colbert directly: "Edwards was born in South Carolina, learned to walk in South Carolina, learned to talk to in South Carolina and will kick Stephen Colbert's New York City butt in South Carolina." One commentator suggested the humorous response might aid Edwards' image by presenting him as a candidate who could "make fun of himself". In addition, Edwards booked American film actor and celebrity Danny Glover to stump for him in South Carolina on the same day Colbert was making his appearance in the state; a chance at a "perfect political salvo", in the opinion of one reporter, although one left underexploited.

Colbert's campaign bumper sticker. Jon Stewart was previously listed under his name as his running mate.

At various times, Colbert had mentioned Mike Huckabee, Vladimir Putin, and even himself, as possible running mates. He also agreed to endorse Garry Kasparov's bid to win the Russian presidency in return for Kasparov's support for his campaign.

Colbert had planned to appear at the College of Charleston on October 27, but was unable to make the event due to a scheduling conflict. One beauty shop owner in Charleston turned down a request from one of the Colbert Report's staffers to use her shop as a staging ground for a Colbert campaign stop, finding the campaign unfunny and insufficiently serious. "I don't even know why he's running in South Carolina," said the Charlestonian. Bob Coble, mayor of Columbia, was more welcoming. On Sunday October 28, 2007, Coble presented Colbert a key to the city, "a proclamation that Colbert is truly 'South Carolina's Favorite Son,'" and a "necktie with Palmetto trees." Residents of the city had previously stated that although they knew Colbert would "use the visit as comedic fodder," they hoped the visit would bring humor and press coverage to the city. Colbert met with former Democratic governor Jim Hodges, who signed Colbert's campaign petition and offered himself as a possible vice presidential choice. Colbert declared to cheering crowds that "I love South Carolina almost as much as South Carolina loves me!", and that his slogan for improving the state in the 21st century will be "First to secede, first to succeed." Colbert also made an appearance the same day at the University of South Carolina, where, playing to interstate rivalry, he promised to "crush the state of Georgia".

Colbert had originally planned to run for both the Republican and Democratic nominations in his home state of South Carolina. Upon obtaining the forms to put himself on the ballot, however, he discovered to do so requires a non-refundable fee of $25,000 plus a $10,000 late fee for the Republican primary and $2,500 or three thousand signatures on a petition for the Democratic primary. On the October 31, 2007 episode of The Colbert Report, Colbert announced that he would no longer be seeking a spot on the Republican Party ballot, primarily because he was unwilling to write a $35,000 check to the Republican Party, but also because spending more than $5,000 on his campaign would make him subject to greater levels of scrutiny under federal election law. However, Colbert reaffirmed his bid for a Democratic ballot spot by displaying a photograph of himself holding a $2,500 personal check made out to the Democratic Party, as well as a notarized application form for the Democratic ballot.

The following day, November 1, 2007, the South Carolina Democratic Party executive council voted 13–3 to refuse Colbert's application onto the ballot. "The general sense of the council was that he wasn't a serious candidate and that was why he wasn't selected to be on the ballot," stated John Werner, the party's director. Colbert announced that he would not continue his campaign.

On the April 28, 2008 episode of The Colbert Report, guest Feist said that she had been planning to offer her song "1234" as the official campaign theme.

At the 2008 Libertarian National Convention, Colbert received one write-in vote for the Libertarian nomination in the second round of voting.

On the June 11, 2009 show, Colbert stated that if he were to run for president again, he would claim his time spent in Iraq as part of the USO as "military service." Colbert was in Iraq as a part of Operation Iraqi Stephen, a tour aimed at supporting and boosting the morale of the United States Military in Iraq.

=== Opinion polling ===
A national poll from Public Opinion Strategies from Oct 18–21 had Colbert receiving 2.3% of the vote in the Democratic field (ahead of Bill Richardson, Chris Dodd, Dennis Kucinich, and Mike Gravel) and less than 1% in the Republican field. A second poll, taken by Rasmussen Reports October 19–21 (before Colbert's Meet the Press appearance), had Colbert receiving 13% as an independent running against Rudy Giuliani and Hillary Clinton, and 12% as an independent running against Fred Thompson and Clinton. Results were particularly high among respondents aged 18–29, where Colbert received 28% of the vote among likely voters in a Giuliani–Clinton contest, and 31% in a Thompson–Clinton contest. Drawing a connection between the two polls, one reporter commented that if Colbert continues "gaining over 10% a week", Colbert "should be leading the field before November is out."

=== Legality and viability ===
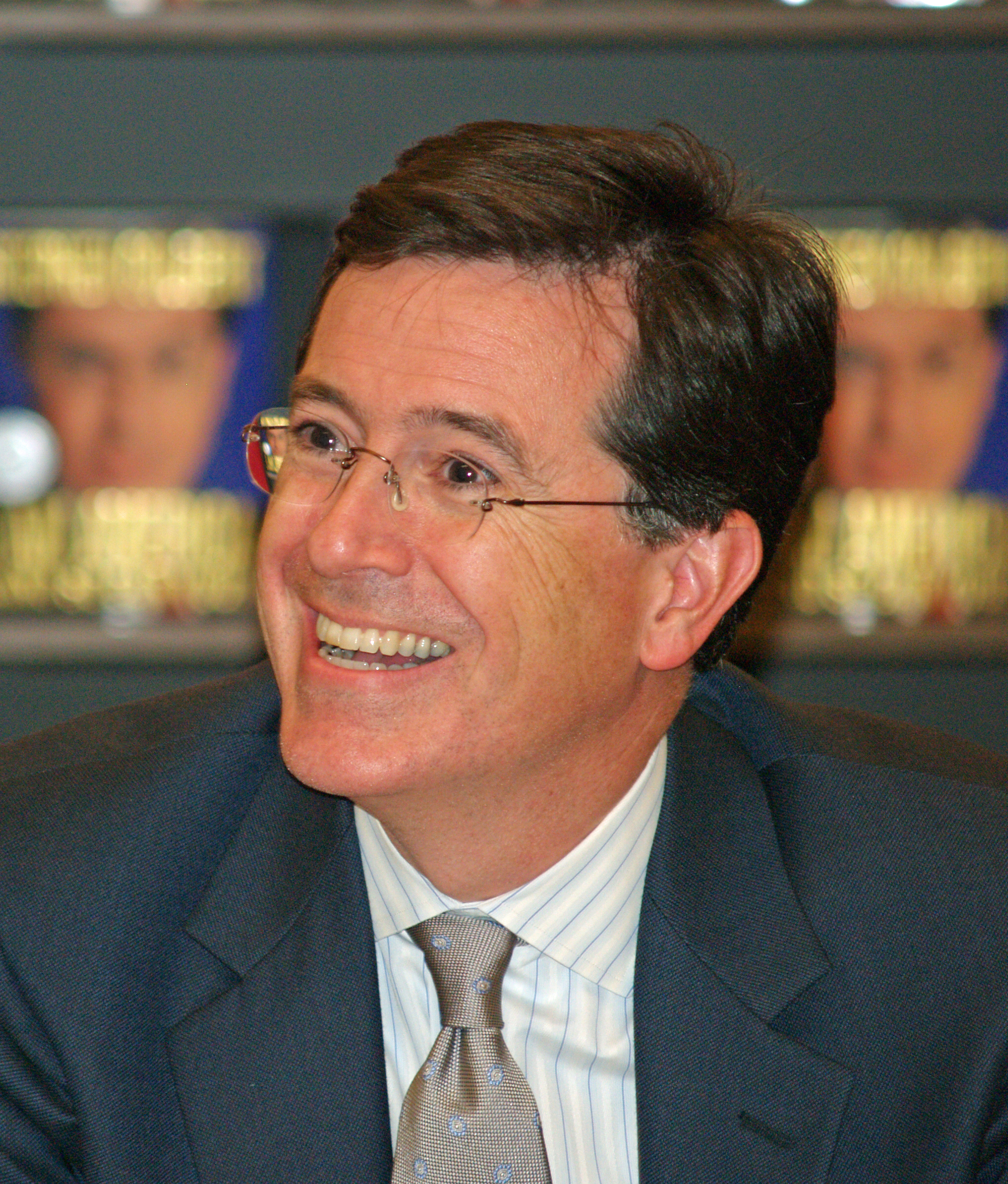
Colbert hosted the Hail to the Cheese Stephen Colbert's Nacho Cheese Doritos 2008 Presidential Campaign Coverage.

Colbert's official sponsor was Doritos brand tortilla chips. In an October 26, 2007 appearance at Cornell University, Colbert declared that, if elected, he would be "as good for the country as Doritos are for your body." Colbert's campaign was initially called the "Hail to the Cheese Stephen Colbert's Nacho Cheese Doritos 2008 Presidential Campaign," until he was advised that the finances obtained from Doritos could legally be used to fund only his television show's coverage of the campaign, rather than the campaign itself. Colbert responded by adding the word "Coverage" to the title. Some commentators argued that such distinctions could have had serious legal ramifications for Colbert irrespective of how serious his campaign effort was. In order to avoid breaking election laws and maintain the distinction between coverage and activism, Colbert had to move a petition for South Carolina Democrats to sign from his show's website to an independent website that is not affiliated with his show. A spokesperson for Comedy Central, the network hosting The Colbert Report, stated that, based on "the law, prior rulings made by the Federal Election Commission and advice of expert outside counsel", there was nothing in the run that ran contrary to federal campaign election laws.

Prior to Colbert's announcement, Colbert Report staff had consulted representatives of both parties. Joe Werner, executive director of the State Democratic Party, had been called by a Colbert representative three weeks before the announcement, for queries regarding filing dates and other requirements. Katon Dawson, chairman of the State GOP, had been called on October 15, a handful of hours before the show declaring Colbert's candidacy was taped. Estimations of Colbert's chances were mixed, but neither party disputed his ability to place himself on their respective ballots. The dual Republican–Democrat nature of the run, however, elicited opposing responses from the party representatives. Dawson found nothing in his party's regulations preventing Colbert from running on both ballots, but Werner was more leery at the suggestion. Said Werner: "I don't believe you can do that." "It's in our rules somewhere that you can't be on two ballots."

Any candidate wishing to run in the South Carolina Democratic Primary requires the approval of the State Democratic Party's Executive Committee, which must declare a candidate viable before adding him to the ballot. The determination of what constitutes viability is up to the Executive Committee alone. The S.C. Democratic Party Executive Committee asserted that a candidate must have actively campaigned in the state before he is listed on the ballot. Several members of the committee expressed dismay over Colbert's apparent lack of serious intention, citing his failure to campaign nationally as a reason to doubt his viability; one member stated that Colbert would only get on the ballot "over my dead body."

Colbert also stated on the aforementioned Meet the Press episode that he did not expect to win the presidency: "I don't want to be president. I want to run for president. There's a difference," he said. Colbert made no attempt to appear on the ballots in any other state primaries, and so it is unlikely that he would have been able to gather enough delegates to secure either party nomination unless he were to win other states by a write-in vote.

Write-in candidates must generally submit forms with intention to run prior to being written-in by the populace; however, some internet campaigns started to garner interest in writing-in Colbert as a purely satirical exercise.

== Reaction ==
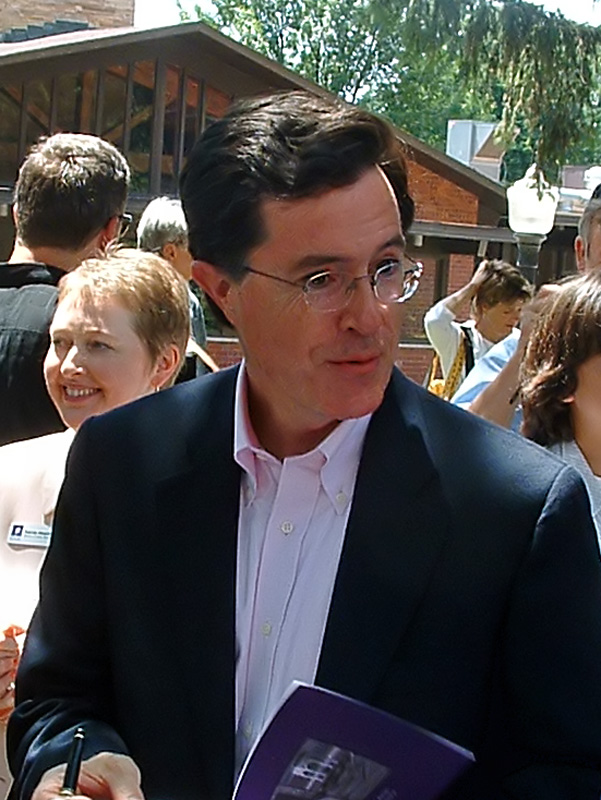
Stephen Colbert at Knox College.

Colbert's campaign has been likened to the plot of the film Man of the Year, in which Robin Williams plays a comedian who runs for president, but more to comedian Pat Paulsen, who received over 200,000 votes when he ran in 1968 as a result of dissatisfaction with the current candidates at that time. While Colbert's motivation remains unclear, his campaign to "bring truthiness to the '08 race" remained popular.

Colbert's candidacy had met mixed reviews, and the growing realization that Colbert may be serious about his candidacy raised the ire of the American political and media establishment. When the Public Opinion Strategies poll put Colbert ahead of Bill Richardson, Richardson's spokesman responded: "This is a serious election with serious consequences and we are not going to comment on this ridiculous exercise". Katon Dawson, South Carolina's Republican party chairman believed Colbert would be better off using the $35,000 entrance fee to "buy a sports car and get a girlfriend". The high polling gave way to what New York called a "Stephen Colbert Backlash", as bloggers criticized Colbert for verging into legitimate political territory, asserting that he had "crossed the line from lampooning the process to actively messing it up." Republican candidate John McCain gave a more positive view, stating that he hoped Colbert would join the Republican party's debates. "He can make them livelier and he can reach a wider audience than that narrow little sliver that watches his show." In conversation with ABC News, Fox News commentator and template for Stephen Colbert's The Colbert Report persona Bill O'Reilly dismissed Colbert's run as a publicity stunt for his book, I Am America. O'Reilly also called Colbert out for not going on the O'Reilly Factor to discuss the book: "He knows the book is dumb, so he's not going to come in. Instead, he runs for president." Sam Brownback's October 19, 2007 withdrawal from the race was humorously attributed by some to competition from the comedian, but others took Colbert's challenge to Brownback's run more seriously. As one reporter for The Atlantic wrote, "Sam Brownback may cite other reasons for dropping out today, but Colbert's plan to run in South Carolina wouldn't have made his job there any easier."

Democratic candidate Barack Obama jokingly questioned the authenticity of Colbert's "native son" posturing: "I don't get much of an accent. If he's from South Carolina, he wasn't really down-home South Carolina — that's my impression. I can't picture Stephen eating grits, but who knows?" Colbert promptly ate several bowls of grits on the next night's show. Carol Fowler, the S.C. Democratic Party chairwoman, stated that Colbert's long absence from the state following his leave for college might backfire on him. The scheme might not work against the other candidates anyway. "By primary day, they'll all be claiming to be from here," she said.

In the 2009 animated film Monsters vs. Aliens, Colbert was chosen to provide the voice of the President of the United States.

Comedy Central's Indecision 2008 coverage during election night, a program which featured both Jon Stewart and Colbert reporting on election results, referenced his failed South Carolina campaign. Upon announcing the results of the election in South Carolina, a state won by John McCain, Colbert's portrait was featured next to the two candidates, framed by Doritos chips.

=== Marvel Comics ===
The Daily Bugle (of the Marvel universe) claimed Stephen Colbert the winner before all the votes were counted.

Despite having withdrawn from the race, Colbert continued to be referred to as a major candidate for the presidency in the comic books of Marvel Comics, polling high among superhumans and mutants. In the Marvel Universe, Colbert's campaign successfully continued as a third party candidate running against both McCain and Obama, on a "Populist" platform. "Colbert '08" paraphernalia appeared in the artwork of various Marvel comics and Colbert himself teamed up with Spider-Man in the October 2008 comic Amazing Spider-Man #573. His policies in the campaign included contacting T'Challa and Doctor Doom for help in fighting the Skrulls. On November 5, 2008, Marvel announced that its fictional newspaper The Daily Bugle was reporting Colbert's victory over both John McCain and Barack Obama. However, several hours later Marvel released a second Daily Bugle article correcting its initial reports, stating that while Colbert had won the popular vote Obama had secured more electoral votes, thus winning the presidency. "Oops, our bad," said Marvel editor-in-chief Joe Quesada of the confusion. "We completely forgot the Marvel Universe reflects what happens in the real world."

=== Facebook popularity ===
The Facebook group "1,000,000 Strong for Stephen T Colbert" became the fastest growing Facebook group in the site's history, having averaged 78 new members per minute It surpassed one million members on October 26, 2007, less than ten days after its creation on October 17. Colbert's group grew at such a rapid rate—as many as 83 people per minute for eight days in a row—that it led one Facebook representative to tell the New York Times that the group had begun "overloading one of our servers," a problem that has since been resolved. The achievement has been given as an example of the networking site's "uncanny ability to mashup the serious and the silly aspects of everything it touches." As of October 25, 2007, the group was the most popular political group on the site, outnumbering the 380,000 of Obama's "1 Million Strong Group", the 500,000 of "Stop Hillary Clinton: (One Million Strong AGAINST Hillary)" and the 615,000 of "I bet I can find 1,000,000 people who dislike George Bush!". Since reaching a peak of 1.5+ million members in late November 2007, the group has gone down steadily; however, it still remains extremely large. As of an unknown date, the Facebook group has been closed for unknown reasons.

== See also ==
- Servant of the People (TV series) - Ukrainian political satire series; the main actor Volodymyr Zelenskyy playing the President of Ukraine became the real President in 2019
