= Charles R. Doty =

American politician

- Doty in his first appearance on The Daily Show with Jon Stewart, April 2000
- Born: January 26, 1924
- Died: April 21, 2003 (aged 79); Tulsa, Oklahoma
- Resting place: Kaw City, Oklahoma
- Education: Oklahoma A&M University
- Occupations: accountant, restaurateur, oil worker
- Known for: Running for U.S. president
- Political party: Democrat; Republican (1992 only)

Charles Richard Doty (January 26, 1924 – April 21, 2003) was an American who is best remembered for his futile attempts at running for president of the United States as a write-in candidate. Doty ran for president five times, gaining national fame on the fifth and final occasion in 2000, when his campaign was featured on The Daily Show with Jon Stewart.

== Biography ==
Doty was born in 1924. During World War II, he served in the United States Navy from 1942 to 1945. In 1954, he received a degree in business administration from Oklahoma A&M University in Stillwater. He worked as an accountant, as a restaurateur, and in the oil business. In his retirement he became a pastor for his own church, the Universal Church of God.

== Political campaigns ==
Doty ran for president as a Democrat in the 1984 and 1988 elections. In 1988, when he spent approximately $20,000, he received 1,005 votes.

He entered the 1992 race as a Republican, saying that after 49 years of being a Democrat, he was changing to Republican only because the party generally agreed with his anti-abortion stance. However, he switched back to Democrat for the 1996 election. In 2000, he entered the race again; although he only had enough money to officially be on the ballot in Kansas, he hoped to gather enough support to win as a write-in candidate.

He also made several unsuccessful attempts running for the local city council, mayor of Tulsa, and governor of Oklahoma.

== Daily Show appearances ==
Doty made five appearances on The Daily Show with Jon Stewart in 2000. His initial appearance was a segment by Vance DeGeneres that aired April 12, 2000, and featured a tongue-in-cheek seriousness, in which DeGeneres stated: "Following unsuccessful presidential bids in 1984, 1988, 1992, and 1996, all eyes are on Oklahoma political powerhouse, Charles Doty." The segment featured an interview with DeGeneres asking for Doty's stance on the "hot button" issues, including the metric system ("against"), the United Nations ("against"), and UFO research ("for"). Doty appeared four more times on the show during its Indecision 2000 coverage, including taking part in "Expert Panels" during the Republican and Democratic conventions, and the election night special ("Choose and Lose"), where he sang his own presidential campaign theme song.

The April 2000 segment was rebroadcast twice in new episodes; the first time was on September 20, 2001, during the first episode that taped after the September 11 attacks. Stewart aired the clip after giving an emotional monologue, stating that he wanted to make his audience smile and that Doty "epitomized this sort of frontier American spirit of a man who believed in all things being possible". The same clip was rebroadcast again after Doty's death in April 2003, when Stewart eulogized him as "one of our most beloved friends" who had "won the hearts of all of us here".

On August 6, 2015—coinciding with Stewart's retirement from The Daily Show—Variety listed Doty's Daily Show appearance as one of the most memorable moments of Stewart's 17 years as host.
