= Man of the Year (2006 film) =

- Theatrical release poster
- Directed by: Barry Levinson
- Written by: Barry Levinson
- Produced by: James G. Robinson
- Starring: Robin Williams; Christopher Walken; Laura Linney; Jeff Goldblum; Lewis Black
- Cinematography: Dick Pope
- Edited by: Blair Daily; Steven Weisberg
- Music by: Graeme Revell
- Production company: Morgan Creek Productions
- Distributed by: Universal Pictures
- Release date: October 13, 2006
- Running time: 115 minutes
- Country: United States
- Language: English
- Budget: $20 million
- Box office: $41.2 million

Man of the Year is a 2006 American comedy-drama thriller film written and directed by Barry Levinson, produced by James G. Robinson and starring Robin Williams. The film also features Christopher Walken, Laura Linney, Lewis Black and Jeff Goldblum.

Williams portrays Tom Dobbs, the host of a humorous political talk show. After an offhand remark, four million people are prompted to e-mail their support, so he decides to campaign for President.

The film was theatrically released by Universal Pictures on October 13, 2006, and was filmed in Toronto and Hamilton, Ontario, and in parts of Washington, D.C. Man of the Year received mostly negative reviews and earned $41.2 million on a $20 million budget.

== Plot ==
Tom Dobbs is host of a satirical news program, tapping into public frustrations with divisive, special interest-driven politics. He laughs off an audience member's suggestion that he run for president but following online support, he announces his campaign on air. Dobbs gets on the ballot in 13 states and participates in a national debate with the Democratic incumbent President Kellogg and Republican candidate Senator Mills.

Eleanor Green works at the Delacroy voting machine company, which will provide machines for the Presidential election. Shortly before the elections, she notices that the voting system does not work correctly. So, Eleanor alerts the head of the company James Hemmings via e-mail, which he deletes.

Dobbs takes the campaign a bit too seriously, to the chagrin of his manager Jack Menken and his show's producer Eddie Langston. The night of the presidential debates, fed up with the other candidates' posturing, he shifts back into comedy, keeping the audience laughing, while making serious points. Dobbs continues his showman persona on the campaign trail, shaking up the political landscape and surging in the polls, but remains well behind Kellogg and Mills.

On Election Day, early returns show Kellogg beating Mills everywhere, exactly as Eleanor predicted the voting system would report. Dobbs sweeps the 13 states in which he is on the ballot, taking enough electoral votes to be elected president. When she confronts Hemmings about the Delacroy computer error, senior executive Stewart turns her aside. While Dobbs and his team move from shock to celebration, Eleanor is attacked in her home and given an injection.

The next day, Eleanor displays erratic behavior and is sent to the hospital, where tests reveal high levels of illegal drugs. Her workmate Danny visits, revealing he has been promoted, which she thinks is an effort to buy him off. He tries to convince her that she has a drug habit, and that no one will listen if she goes public, but she decides that Dobbs will believe her.

Traveling to Washington and impersonating an FBI agent, Eleanor explains to Dobbs that she was recently fired by Delacroy, but he is pulled away before she can explain the election results. He tries to contact her by calling Delacroy's headquarters, and Hemmings explains she was fired due to a drug problem.

Eleanor figures out the flaw in Delacroy's system: regardless of the actual results, the system declares the winner as the name with double letters, in alphabetical order, so that Do"bb"s beats Kello"gg," which beats Mi"ll"s. She calls Dobbs, who whisks her off to a Thanksgiving celebration with his friends. Smitten with her, he says that he already knows about her drug problem, which Eleanor denies and, before leaving, tells him that the election result was wrong.

Dobbs calls Eleanor, telling her that he will break the news the next day. She calls Danny, who informs Stewart, who preempts Dobbs' public announcement by announcing that Eleanor was caught attempting to manipulate the election for Dobbs, but that her efforts had no impact on the polls. Dobbs' team turns against Eleanor, except for Dobbs. She becomes increasingly concerned for her safety when she sees Delacroy agents break into her motel room and take her computer.

Eleanor flees to a crowded mall but is followed and apprehended by a Delacroy agent. She escapes and calls Dobbs from a pay phone but another agent drives his truck into the phone booth. Dobbs goes to the scene and talks with the injured Eleanor in her ambulance, where she convinces him of the truth. Dobbs' friends encourage him to remain president, with polls showing that 60% of the nation wants him in office.

That night, invited onto the Weekend Update segment of Saturday Night Live, Dobbs announces that the Delacroy vote system was flawed, that Eleanor told her bosses but they covered it up and silenced her and that he will not run in the new election that must now take place. President Kellogg wins a second term, Dobbs returns to hosting his satirical news program, with Eleanor as his producer, and later his wife, and the Delacroy executives are arrested. Time chooses Dobbs as Man of the Year.

== Cast ==
- Robin Williams as Tom Dobbs
- Christopher Walken as Jack Menken
- Laura Linney as Eleanor Green
- Lewis Black as Eddie Langston
- Jeff Goldblum as Stewart
- David Alpay as Danny
- Rick Roberts as James Hemmings
- Karen Hines as Alison McAndrews
- Linda Kash as Jenny Adams
- David Nichols as President Kellogg
- David Ferry as Senator Mills
- Jacqueline Pillon as Security Tech

Tina Fey and Amy Poehler make cameo appearances as themselves as part of the Weekend Update segment on Saturday Night Live.

== Production ==
=== Casting ===
Director Barry Levinson originally wanted Howard Stern for the starring role of Tom Dobbs, which would have been his second movie role after starring as himself in Private Parts. Scheduling conflicts with Stern's debut on Sirius radio prevented him from taking on the part.

== Release ==
Universal Pictures theatrically released Man of the Year on October 13, 2006. The film debuted at #3 at the box office in its opening weekend. It grossed $37.3 million in North America and $3.9 million in other territories, for a total worldwide gross of $41.2 million.

Universal Studios Home Entertainment released it on DVD on February 20, 2007, from which it grossed another $25.1 million in sales. Sony Pictures Home Entertainment released it on Blu-ray on November 3, 2020.

== Reception ==
On the review aggregator website Rotten Tomatoes, 22% of 145 critics' reviews are positive, with an average rating of 4.5/10. The website's consensus reads: "Weakened by second-half attempts at thriller and romance, this presidential comedy also fails to hit any sharp political notes, resulting in a confused and unsatisfying mess." Metacritic, which uses a weighted average, assigned the film a score of 39 out of 100, based on 30 critics, indicating "generally unfavorable" reviews. Audiences polled by CinemaScore gave the film an average grade of "B+" on an A+ to F scale.

Stephanie Zacharek of Salon wrote: "It's a comedy, a political thriller, a love story: Barry Levinson's Man of the Year tries to be all things to all people and fails on every count – a little like the generic, ineffectual politicians it's pretending to excoriate." James Berardinelli of ReelViews felt it "makes telling points and has a lot to say, but it loses its voice along with its consistency around the mid-way point". Josh Larsen of the Sun Publications line of newspapers asked straight out: "What is it about Robin Williams that he often appears in these wild misfires, pictures that are so full of promise yet so disastrous in execution?"

Frank Lovece of Film Journal International placed the well-regarded Levinson's challenge and failure within a larger context: "If satire is what dies on a Saturday night, then political-satire movies are what die on Fridays. Maybe we're used to the TV topicality of The Daily Show with Jon Stewart or Real Time with Bill Maher, whereas movies are months in the making, turning their current events into history. Yet successful satire needn't be topical – witness Network, Election, Dr. Strangelove – because some verities are timeless. Since when, after all, hasn't there been a populist saying, 'Throw the rascals out'?"

The film would later be seen as prescient, with the election of TV comedians to the presidency of both Guatemala (Jimmy Morales in 2017) and Ukraine (Volodymyr Zelenskyy in 2019) and TV star Donald Trump in 2016 as well as the attempts to overturn the 2020 United States presidential election due to alleged computer fraud.

== See also ==
- Pat Paulsen, comedian who ran for president
- Vermin Supreme, comedian and perennial candidate
- Donald Trump, television personality who became President of the United States
- Stephen Colbert presidential campaign, 2008
- Servant of the People (2015 TV series), Ukrainian TV series where Volodymyr Zelenskyy played a fictional president, before becoming president himself
