= The Daily Show: Indecision 2006 =

The Daily Show with Jon Stewart's Indecision 2006 was Stewart's coverage of the 2006 general elections. It extended for most of the campaign period for that election, but grew especially intensive toward the actual date of the election on November 7.

In particular, the Indecision 2006 coverage extended to the Midwest Midterm Midtacular, which was a special of The Daily Show that aired from October 30, 2006 through November 2, 2006. It was filmed in Columbus, Ohio at Roy Bowen Theater on the campus of Ohio State University.

The Midtacular chose to film in Ohio due to that state's highly contested and critical role in the outcomes of both the midterm elections held on November 7, 2006 and in the 2004 Presidential election (another possible reason is that Ohio is located in the Midwest/middle of the United States, in keeping with the "middle" centric theme). Featured candidates from Ohio were the successful Ohio Governor's election candidate Ted Strickland and opponent Ken Blackwell and successful Democratic Ohio Senate election candidate Sherrod Brown who went on to defeat incumbent Republican Mike DeWine.

It was the fifth time that The Daily Show traveled outside New York City for its Indecision campaign. Philadelphia, Los Angeles, Washington, DC, and Boston (for the 2004 Democratic National Convention) have also been featured.

== First episode ==
The first episode of the special was covered from various Applebee's restaurants in Youngstown, Cincinnati, and Shaker Heights as well as a Bob Evans restaurant in Chillicothe. In addition, Samantha Bee covered a segment from Columbus—filming at the Ohio Statehouse and the Columbus Hooters. The first guest on the special was Cleveland Cavaliers star LeBron James.

The crowd showed strong vocal support for successful Democratic candidates Brown and Strickland. They booed at footage where Blackwell suggested Strickland had been a member of the North American Man/Boy Love Association and cheered when LeBron James claimed he would have attended Ohio State University had he not been able to enter the NBA at 18.

== Second episode ==
The second episode featured specials on voting changes made by Ken Blackwell that restricted voting by minorities in 2004. It was said that, "this was the first time a black man was able to disenfranchise someone in this country." It also featured the tight races in Ohio, Pennsylvania, Montana, and Tennessee. Also, the political commercials that have been featured across the nation were parodied. Stewart's guest was The Ohio State University political science professor John Mueller who wrote the book Overblown.

== Midterm Midtacular Election Day Special ==
The Midtacular culminated in a live, hour-long episode on the night of Election Day, November 7, 2006. The episode was a joint venture with The Colbert Report and its host, former Daily Show correspondent Stephen Colbert. Former CBS news anchor Dan Rather also joined as a special correspondent. Guests included Robert Wexler and Eleanor Holmes Norton.

== See also ==
- The Daily Show: Indecision 2000
- The Daily Show: Indecision 2004
- Comedy Central's Indecision 2008
- The Daily Show: Indecision 2010
