= Comedy Central's Indecision 2008 =

Comedy Central's Indecision 2008 was the special coverage of the United States presidential election provided by several programs on the Comedy Central network.

Unlike the previous "Indecision" specials, presented only by The Daily Show (or The Daily Show and The Colbert Report, in the case of Indecision 2006 Midterm Midtacular), two Comedy Central programs were involved. Lil' Bush was originally going to be the third show involved, but after the show's second season finale on May 15, 2008, it entered an indefinite hiatus that had not ended by the time of the election.

== Clusterf@#k to the White House ==
During 2007, The Daily Show's coverage of early events in the election has been named Clusterf@#k to the White House, alluding to the many candidates that had entered the election race.

On April 9, 2007, the show revealed its new election set, in the style of network news stations like CNN, NBC, and Fox News.

On August 26, coverage of the 2008 Democratic National Convention began, and The Daily Show moved temporarily to Denver, Colorado, interviewing members of the convention. The following week The Daily Show traveled to St. Paul, Minnesota to cover and attend the Republican National Convention.

== Don't F@#k This Up America ==
The Colbert Report has named its coverage of the 2008 election campaign Indecision 2008: Don't F@#k This Up America.

=== Doritos sponsorship ===
From October 18, 2007, The Colbert Report started calling its coverage of Stephen Colbert's own presidential campaign the Hail to the Cheese Stephen Colbert Nacho Cheese Doritos 2008 Presidential Campaign Coverage. The Doritos sponsorship was a result of Colbert's character finding out that he was not allowed to use the Doritos corporate sponsorship to fund his own presidential campaign and thus diverted the funds to sponsor the election coverage segments of his show.

On March 17, 2008, Stephen kicked off a preview for his visit to Philadelphia to cover the primary between Barack Obama and Hillary Clinton, entitled "Stephen Colbert's Doritos Spicy Sweet Pennsylvania Campaign Coverage, Live from Chiladelphia: The City of Brotherly Crunch!"

== The "Indecision 2008: America's Choice" ==
On the night of November 4, 2008, The Daily Show and The Colbert Report teamed up for a 40-minute coverage of the elections called "Indecision 2008: America's Choice Live Election Special (A.K.A. The Final Endgame Go Time Alpha Action Lift-Off Decide-icidal Hungry Man's Extreme Raw Power Ultimate Voteslam Smackdown '08 No Mercy: Judgement Day '08)." Two guests appeared: Steve Forbes, former GOP candidate in the U.S. Presidential primaries in 1996 and 2000, and Charles Ogletree, Jr., teacher of both Barack and Michelle Obama (Michelle Robinson at the time) when they were both students at Harvard Law School. In between reporting results from various electoral votes in selected states, correspondents from The Daily Show reported "updates" from the respective headquarters of both presidential candidates, as well as "reactions" from the international community, particularly from Pakistan.

During the final segment of the show, Jon Stewart announced that Barack Obama had won the election. The entire team went through withdrawal, finally exiting onto the roof of The Daily Show studio, remarking on the world "without George Bush", before Colbert brought them back to reality by saying that Bush still has two and a half months left as president.

Many jokes in the show were based on the discomfort of Colbert, who was attempting to ignore Obama's apparent victory by distracting the show with methods such as inviting a cockatoo to sit on his shoulder and greeting fictional characters who recently celebrated their 100th birthdays.

== See also ==
- The Daily Show: Indecision 2000
- The Daily Show: Indecision 2004
- The Daily Show: Indecision 2006
- List of The Daily Show recurring segments
