= Comedy Central's Indecision 2000 =

Comedy Central's Indecision 2000 was a series of special episodes featured on The Daily Show with Jon Stewart spoofing the 2000 US presidential election. This series covered the primaries leading up to the general election between George W. Bush and Al Gore. The series featured "correspondents" at the Democratic National Convention as well as the Republican National Convention. At the conventions, the correspondents interviewed many politicians in the comedic style that has made The Daily Show famous. On the first episode after election night, Jon Stewart said that the name was a joke and he had not expected people to take it seriously, referring to the debacle in Florida.

This edition of Indecision also included a separate series called Lewis Black's World of Politics, aired during the Republican and Democratic national conventions and featuring Lewis Black. It was included on Black's DVD releases Lewis Black - Unleashed in 2003.

In 2000, Indecision 2000 won a Peabody Award.

== Impact on future episodes of The Daily Show ==
The "Indecision" title became a standard for mock election coverage of various kinds afterwards in regular versions of The Daily Show.

1. "A Spot of Indecision 2005" for the 2005 United Kingdom Parliamentary Elections,
2. "Indecision 5766" for the 2006 Israeli Knesset Elections, making a joke on the Hebrew calendar.
3. "Indecision/Indécision 2006" for the 2006 Canadian general election.
4. "Indecision 08" For the 2008 US Presidential elections
5. "Indecision-ski 08-avitch" for the Russian Presidential elections
6. "Indecision oh-eh?" In 2008, the leaders of the opposition parties of Canada formed a coalition to try overthrow the Prime Minister
7. In 2009, The Daily Show used the Indecision and added the letters "RA" in it to make "Irandecision 2009", covering the chaos of the 2009 Iran election.
8. The Daily Show's coverage of the South Sudanese independence referendum was branded as "Inde-Sudan 2011."

The 2008 Election has also been referred to on The Daily Show as "Clusterf@#k to the White House", due to the numerous presidential candidates at the beginning of the race.

The April 12, 2000 segment on five-time write-in candidate Charles R. Doty from Oklahoma was rebroadcast twice; the first on September 20, 2001, the first episode that taped after the September 11 attacks. After giving an emotional monologue, Stewart said that he hoped to make his audience smile by airing the clip about Doty, who he said "epitomized this sort of frontier American spirit of a man who believed in all things being possible." The clip rebroadcast again in June 2003 after Doty's death.

On September 11, 2007, Stephen Colbert announced he was beginning a new segment for the upcoming 14 months to the 2008 election, titling it "Indecision 2008: Don't F%#K this up America".

== Notes ==
Indecision 2000 was the first of the "Indecision" specials on The Daily Show although not the first for Comedy Central. (The "Indecision" brand was introduced during the 1992 Presidential Campaign, beginning with coverage of the 1992 Democratic National Convention hosted by Al Franken.) The next was The Daily Show: Indecision 2004 covering the 2004 Presidential Election.

== See also ==
- The Daily Show: Indecision 2004
- The Daily Show: Indecision 2006
- Comedy Central's Indecision 2008
- List of Peabody Award winners (2000-2009)
