= The Daily Show: Indecision 2004 =

- Directed by: Christian Santago
- Starring: Jon Stewart; Stephen Colbert; Rob Corddry; Ed Helms; Samantha Bee
- Distributed by: Paramount Pictures Home Entertainment
- Release date: June 28, 2005
- Running time: 299 minutes
- Country: United States
- Language: English

The Daily Show: Indecision 2004 is a DVD boxed set of several episodes of The Daily Show with Jon Stewart relating to the 2004 presidential election. The episodes were all filmed during 2004, and feature interviews with political candidates and parodies of the events during the general election campaign.

Disc one contains the full week of 2004 Democratic National Convention coverage while disc two focuses on the 2004 Republican National Convention. Disc three is the "extras" disc, including their election night coverage, the first presidential debate, and several segments from Daily Show correspondents. There are also several miscellaneous bonus materials, like the national anthem sung in "four correspondent harmony," Stephen Colbert doing "requiem for a show that was daily" and John Edwards declaring his candidacy on the show.

For this special series, The Daily Show was awarded the Peabody Award in 2004. Peabody Award sponsors awarded the show/program "for its unmatched wit and unorthodox approach in putting the 2004 Presidential Election in perspective without diminishing its importance." The George Foster Peabody Awards "recognize distinguished achievements and meritorious service by broadcasters, cable and webcasters, producing organizations, and individuals." Comedy Central's previous Indecision 2000 series also won a Peabody.
