= The Daily Show =

American late-night satirical news television program

- Also known as: TDS: The Daily Show with Craig Kilborn (1996–1998); The Daily Show with Jon Stewart (1999–2015); The Daily Show with Trevor Noah (2015–2022); The Daily Social Distancing Show with Trevor Noah (2020–2021)
- Genre: Late-night talk show; News/political satire
- Created by: Madeleine Smithberg; Lizz Winstead
- Written by: Several writers
- Directed by: David Paul Meyer (2018–present): Andy Barsh (1996–1997); Scott Preston (1997–2000); Chuck O'Neil (2000–2017); Paul Pennolino (2017–2020)
- Presented by: Craig Kilborn; Jon Stewart; Trevor Noah; Ronny Chieng; Jordan Klepper; Michael Kosta; Desi Lydic; Dulcé Sloan; Josh Johnson
- Starring: Several correspondents
- Theme music composer: Bob Mould
- Opening theme: "Dog on Fire", arranged by Vanacore Music (Note: Originally performed by Bob Mould from 1996 to early 1999, and later arranged by They Might Be Giants from later 1999 to 2015. Remixed by Timbaland and King Logan from 2016 to 2022.)
- Country of origin: United States
- No. of episodes: 4,169 (list of episodes)

Production
- Executive producer: Jill Katz (2015–present); Jen Flanz (2013–present); Jon Stewart (1999–2015, 2024–present); Other producers: Rory Albanese (2008–2013); Steve Bodow (2013–2019, 2024–present); Timothy Greenberg (2014–2016); Ben Karlin (2004–2006); David Javerbaum (2007–2008); Josh Lieb (2008–2010); Adam Lowitt (2013–2017); Madeleine Smithberg (1996–2003); Trevor Noah (2015–2022)
- Production location: NEP Studio 52, New York City (2005–2020, 2022–present): Hudson Hotel, New York City (1996–1998); NEP Studio 54, New York City (1998–2005); Noah's apartment, New York City (2020–2021); Paramount Global Headquarters, One Astor Plaza (2021–2022)
- Running time: 22 minutes (1996–2020; 2023); 45 minutes (2020–2022); 22 minutes (2024–2025 - Tuesday to Thursday); 45 minutes (2024–present - Monday); 25 minutes (2025–present - Tuesday to Thursday)
- Production companies: Comedy Partners (1996–present); MTV Entertainment Studios (2021–25); Paramount Television Studios (2025–present); Busboy Productions (1999–2015, (Note: Copyright only) 2024–present); Mad Cow Productions (1996–2002); Ark Angel (2015–2022)

Original release
- Network: Comedy Central (1996–present); Paramount+ (2021–present)
- Release: July 22, 1996 – present

Related
- The Jon Stewart Show; The Colbert Report; The Nightly Show with Larry Wilmore; The Opposition with Jordan Klepper; Last Week Tonight with John Oliver

The Daily Show is an American late-night talk and news satire television program. Launched in 1996, the half-hour show airs each Monday through Thursday on Comedy Central in the United States, with extended episodes released shortly after on Paramount+. The Daily Show draws its comedy and satire from recent news stories, political figures, and media organizations. It often uses self-referential humor. Jon Stewart hosts the Monday edition. The current team of hosting correspondents for Tuesdays through Thursdays are Ronny Chieng, Michael Kosta, Jordan Klepper, Desi Lydic, and Josh Johnson. Troy Iwata and Grace Kuhlenschmidt are non-hosting correspondents. Jen Flanz is showrunner.

The Daily Show is the longest-running program on Comedy Central and has won 26 Primetime Emmy Awards. It premiered on July 22, 1996, and was hosted by Craig Kilborn as The Daily Show until December 17, 1998. Stewart then hosted The Daily Show with Jon Stewart from January 11, 1999, until August 6, 2015; he turned the show away from Kilborn's pop-culture focus toward political and news satire. Stewart was succeeded by Trevor Noah, who hosted The Daily Show with Trevor Noah from September 28, 2015, until December 2022. After Noah left, the show was led by a rotating cast of guest hosts. On February 12, 2024, Stewart returned to host Monday shows while correspondents rotated hosting duties for the other weekdays. Stewart, who originally signed on to host through the fall 2024 elections, later extended his contract into 2028.

The program has been popular among young audiences. The Pew Research Center suggested in 2010 that 74% of regular viewers were between 18 and 49, and that 10% of the audience watched the show for its news headlines, 2% for in-depth reporting, and 43% for entertainment; compared with respectively 64%, 10% and 4%, who said the same of CNN. In 2015, The Daily Show's median age of viewership was 36 years old. Between 2014 and 2023, the show's ratings declined by 75%, and its average viewer age increased to 63. In 2023, the viewership for age range of 25–54-year-olds was 158,000 and the viewership for 18–34-year-olds was 30,000.

== Format ==
=== Opening segment ===
During Jon Stewart and Trevor Noah's tenures as host, each episode began with announcer Drew Birns announcing the date and the introduction, "From Comedy Central's World News Headquarters in New York, this is The Daily Show with Jon Stewart/Trevor Noah". Previously, the introduction was "This is The Daily Show, the most important television program, ever." The host then opens the show with a monologue drawing from current news stories and issues. Previously, the show had divided its news commentary into sections known as "Headlines", "Other News", and "This Just In"; these titles were dropped from regular use on October 28, 2002, and were last used on March 6, 2003. Some episodes will begin with a 1–3-minute intro on a small story (or small set of stories) before moving to the main story of the night. Currently, the segment is simply called "Headlines".

=== Correspondent segments ===
The monologue segment is often followed by a segment featuring an exchange with a correspondent, either at the anchor desk with the host or reporting from a false location in front of a greenscreen showing stock footage. They typically present absurd or humorously exaggerated takes on current events against the host's straight man. Some correspondent segments involve the show's members travelling to different locations to file comedic reports on current news stories and conduct interviews with people related to the featured issue.

Correspondents are typically introduced as the show's "senior" specialist in the story's subject, and can range from relatively general (such as Senior Political Analyst) to absurdly specific (such as Senior Religious Registry Correspondent). The cast of correspondents is quite diverse, and many often sarcastically portray extreme stereotypes of themselves to poke fun at a news story, such as "Senior Latino Correspondent", "Senior Youth Correspondent" or "Senior Black Correspondent".

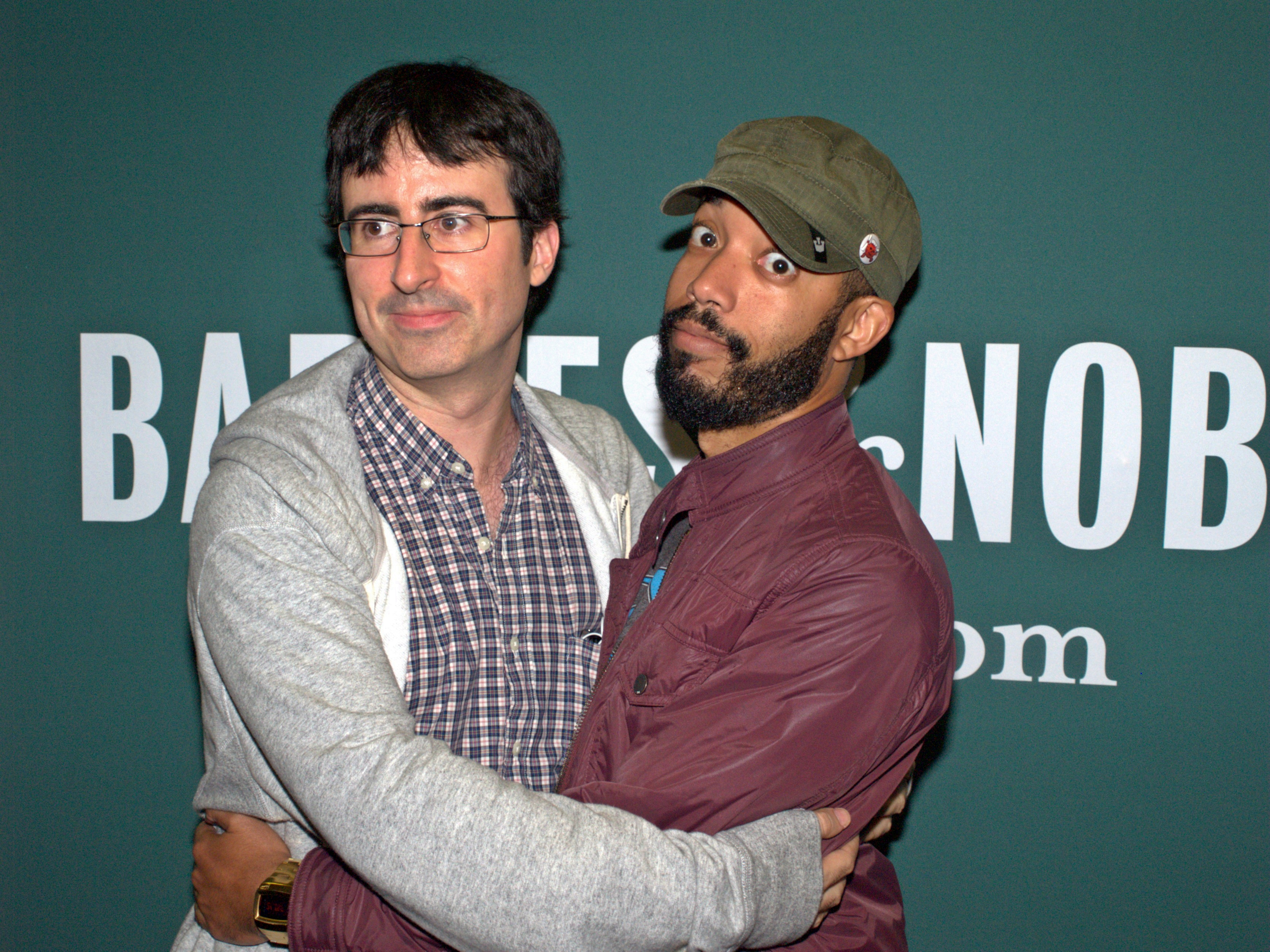
Former correspondents John Oliver and Wyatt Cenac at the launch of Earth (The Book): A Visitor's Guide to the Human Race

While correspondents stated to be reporting abroad are usually performing in-studio in front of a greenscreen background, on rare occasions, cast members have recorded pieces on location. For instance, during the week of August 20, 2007, the show aired a series of segments called "Operation Silent Thunder: The Daily Show in Iraq" in which correspondent Rob Riggle reported from Iraq. In August 2008, Riggle traveled to China for a series of segments titled "Rob Riggle: Chasing the Dragon", which focused on the 2008 Beijing Olympics.

Jason Jones traveled to Iran in early June 2009 to report on the Iranian elections, and John Oliver traveled to South Africa for the series of segments "Into Africa" to report on the 2010 FIFA World Cup. In March 2012, Oliver traveled to Gabon, on the west African coast, to report on the Gabonese government's decision to donate $2 million to UNESCO after the United States cut its funding for UNESCO earlier that year. On July 19, 2016, Roy Wood Jr. reported live from the Republican National Convention and talked about Donald Trump's African-American support.

Topics have varied widely; during the early years of the show, they tended toward character-driven human interest stories such as Bigfoot enthusiasts. Since Stewart began hosting in 1999, the focus of the show has become more political and the field pieces have come to more closely reflect current issues and debates. Under Kilborn and the early years of Stewart, most interviewees were either unaware or not entirely aware of the comedic nature of The Daily Show. However, as the show began to gain popularity — particularly following its coverage of the 2000 and 2004 presidential elections — most of the subjects now interviewed are aware of the comedic element.

=== Recurring segments ===
Some segments have recurred periodically throughout different tenures, such as "Back in Black" (segments hosted by comedian Lewis Black) and "Your Moment of Zen," which is credited to Madeleine Smithberg, and reportedly inspired by her cat's fascination with CBS Sunday Morning. Since the 2003 invasion of Iraq, a common segment of the show has been dubbed "Mess O' Potamia", focusing on the United States' policies in the Middle East, especially Iraq. Elections in the United States were a prominent focus in the show's "Indecision" coverage throughout Stewart & Noah's time as host (the title "InDecision" is a parody of NBC News' "Decision" segment). Since 2000, under Stewart's tenure, the show went on the road to record week-long specials from the cities hosting the Democratic and Republican national conventions. For the 2006 U.S. midterm elections, a week of episodes was recorded in the contested state of Ohio. The "Indecision" & "Democalypse" coverage of the 2000, 2002, 2004, 2006, 2008, 2010, 2012, 2014, 2016 elections all culminated in live Election Night specials.

With Noah as host, one new recurring segment has been "What the Actual Fact", with correspondent Desi Lydic examining statements made by political figures during speeches or events. Under Noah, the continuation of "Democalypse" and "Indecision" also took place with live shows after the Republican National Convention and Democratic National Convention. For the first time, under Noah, the show also went live after all three U.S. presidential debates in 2016.

=== Interviews ===
In the show's third act, the host conducts an interview with a celebrity guest. Guests come from a wide range of cultural sources, and include actors, musicians, authors, athletes, pundits, policy experts and political figures. During Stewart's tenure, the show's guests tended away from celebrities and more towards non-fiction authors and political pundits, as well as many prominent elected officials. In the show's earlier years it struggled to book high-profile politicians. (In 1999, for an Indecision 2000 segment, Steve Carell struggled to talk his way off Republican candidate John McCain's press overflow bus and onto the Straight Talk Express). However its rise in popularity, particularly following the show's coverage of the 2000 and 2004 elections, made Stewart according to a Rolling Stone (2006) article, "the hot destination for anyone who wants to sell books or seem hip, from presidential candidates to military dictators". Newsweek labeled it "the coolest pit stop on television".

Prominent political guests have included former U.S. Presidents Joe Biden, Jimmy Carter, Bill Clinton and Barack Obama, former British Prime Ministers Tony Blair and Gordon Brown, former Pakistani President Pervez Musharraf, former Liberian President Ellen Johnson Sirleaf, former Bolivian President Evo Morales, Jordanian King Abdullah II, former Estonian Prime Minister Taavi Roivas, Canadian Prime Minister Justin Trudeau and former Mexican President Vicente Fox.

The show has played host to former and current members of the administration and Cabinet as well as members of Congress. Numerous presidential candidates have appeared on the show during their campaigns, including John McCain, John Kerry, Barack Obama and Hillary Clinton.

=== Closing segment ===
In a closing segment, there is a brief segue to the closing credits in the form of the host introducing "Your Moment of Zen", a humorous piece of video footage without commentary that has been part of the show's wrap-up since the series began in 1996. The segment often relates to a story covered earlier in the episode, but occasionally is merely a humorous or ridiculous clip. Occasionally, the segment is used as a tribute to someone who has died.

Sometimes, before the "Your Moment of Zen", this segment is used for quick promotions. The host might promote the show that follows right after their broadcast, such as promoting the show @midnight. This time has also been used to promote films, books or stand-up specials that are affiliated with the host.

In October 2005, following The Colbert Report's premiere, a new feature (sometimes referred to as the toss) was added to the closing segment in which Stewart would have a short exchange with "our good friend, Stephen Colbert at The Colbert Report", which aired immediately after. The two would have a scripted comedic exchange via split-screen from their respective sets. In 2007, the "toss" was cut back to twice per week, and by 2009 was once a week before gradually being phased out. It was used on the 2014 mid-term election night and again just before the final episode of The Colbert Report on December 18, 2014, and returned upon the premiere of The Nightly Show with Larry Wilmore. Stewart then regularly tossed to Wilmore at the end of his Monday night episodes. Under Noah, the "toss" has been used for The Opposition with Jordan Klepper and Lights Out with David Spade.

== Studio ==
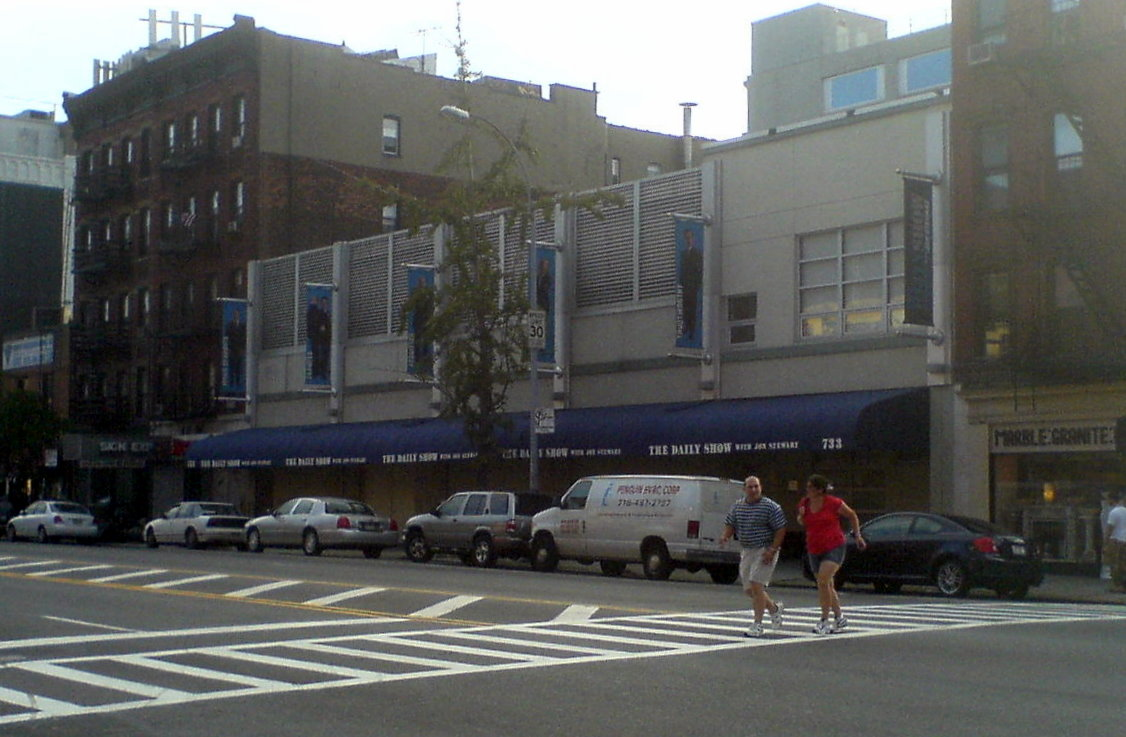
Outside of the Daily Show studio, pictured in 2007, during Stewart's tenure

The host sits at his desk on the elevated island stage in the style of a traditional news show. The show initially used New York PBS station WNET's facilities until late 1998, when it moved a few blocks to NEP Studio 54. The Colbert Report would claim NEP Studio 54 in 2005. On July 11, 2005, the show premiered in its new studio, NEP Studio 52, at 733 11th Avenue, a few blocks west of its former location. The set of the new studio was given a sleeker, more formal look, including a backdrop of three large projection screens. The traditional guests' couch, which had been a part of the set since the show's premiere, was done away with in favor of simple upright chairs. The change was initially not well-received, spawning a backlash among some fans and prompting a "Bring Back the Couch" campaign. The campaign was mentioned on subsequent shows by Stewart and supported by Daily Show contributor Bob Wiltfong. The couch was eventually featured in a sweepstakes in which the winner received the couch, round-trip tickets to New York, tickets to the show, and a small sum of money.

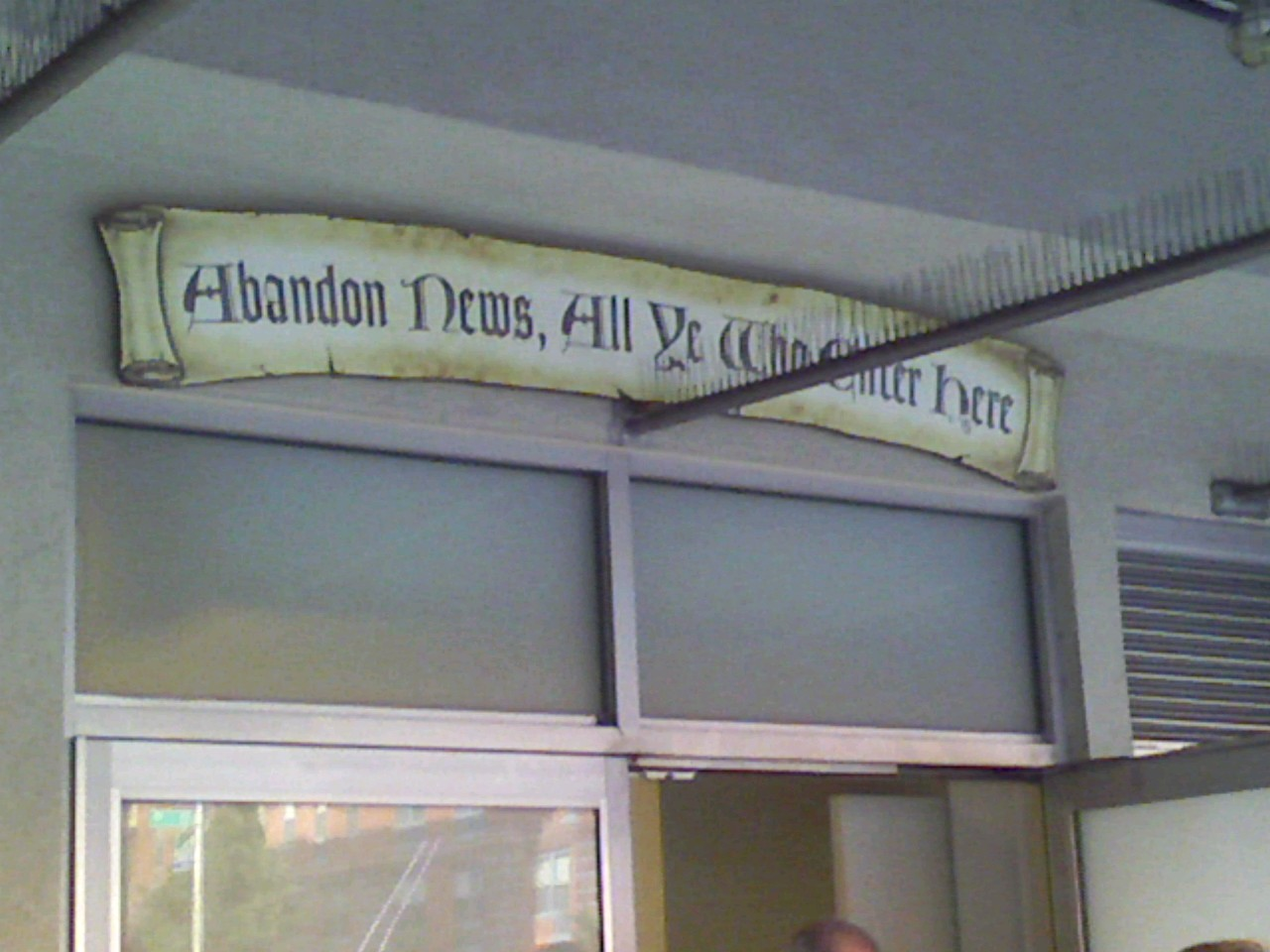
The sign over the entryway of the current Daily Show studio

On April 9, 2007, the show debuted a new set. The projection screens were revamped (with one large screen behind Stewart, while the smaller one behind the interview subject remained the same), a large, global map directly behind Stewart, a more open studio floor, and a J-shaped desk supported at one end by a globe. The intro was also updated; the graphics, display names, dates, and logos were all changed.

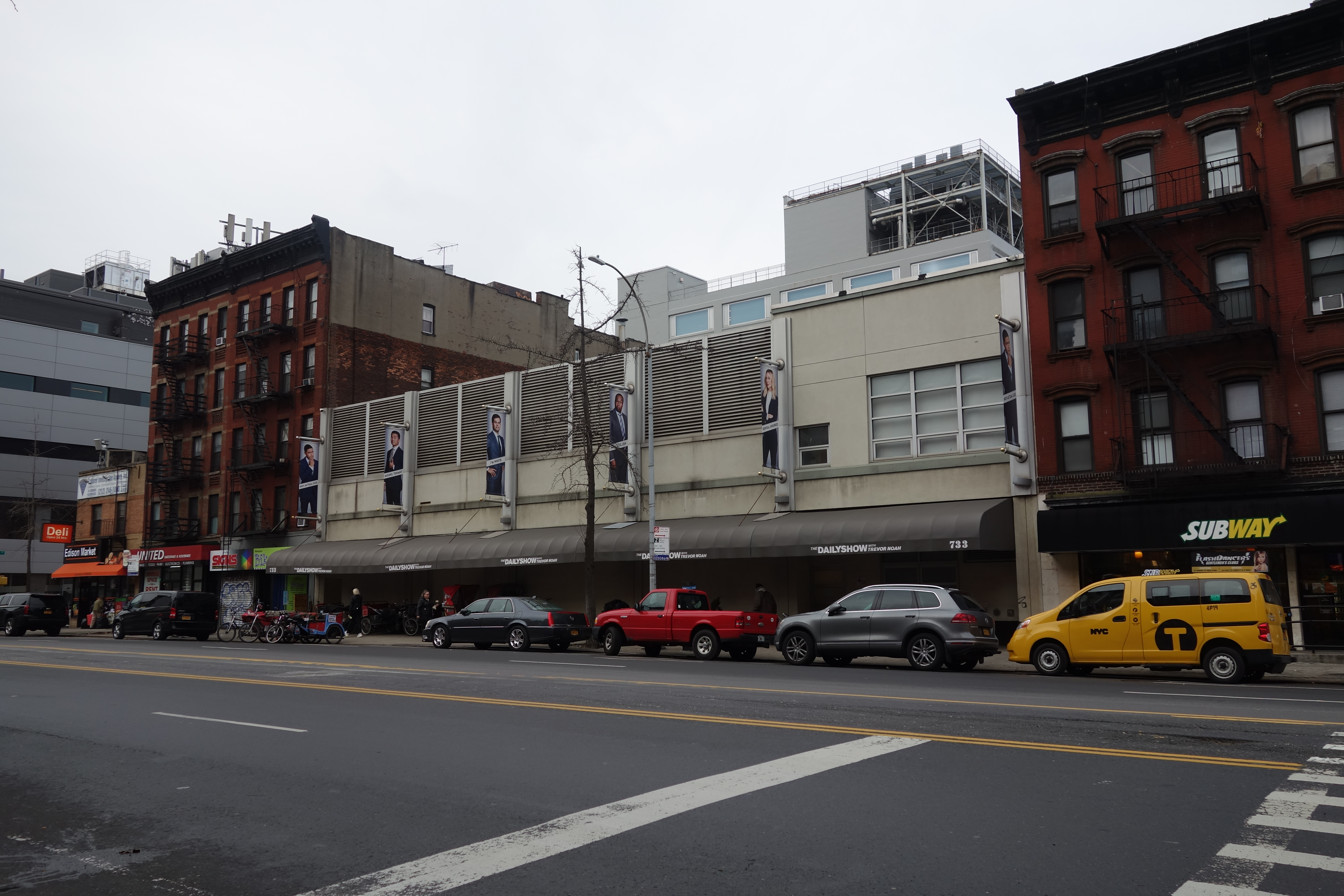
Outside of the Daily Show studio, pictured in 2019, during Noah's tenure

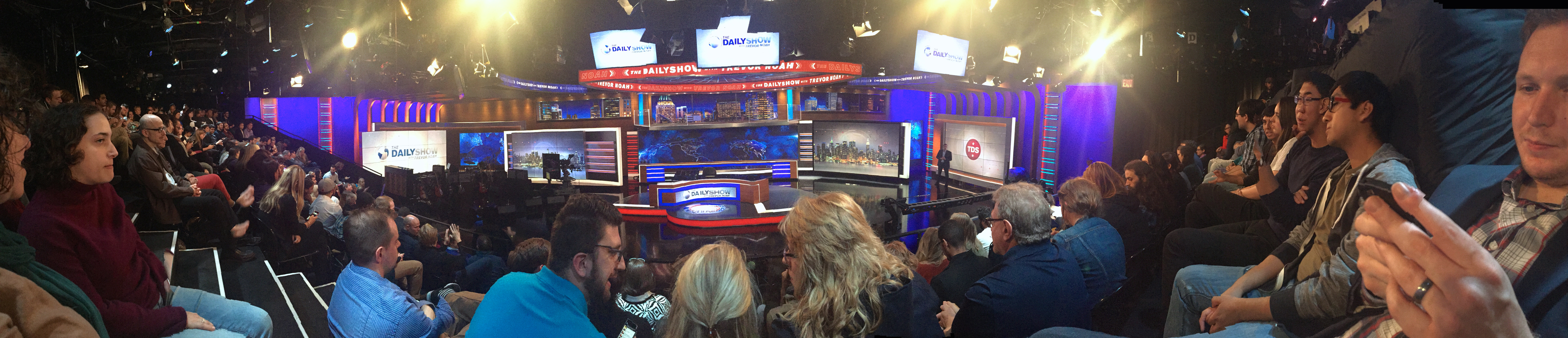
Behind the scenes of The Daily Show with host Trevor Noah

On September 28, 2015, the show debuted a new set alongside the debut of Trevor Noah's tenure. According to Larry Hartman, Noah took a lot of inspiration from Stewart's set. A second on-stage 'jumbo-tron' was added and the colours of the set were made lighter. The graphics, intro, theme music, lower thirds, logo, etc. were also all revamped. On July 19, 2016, the set and graphics were given another change to reflect Democalypse 2016 and denote The Daily Show's RNC and DNC coverage (which was taped in the conventions' respective cities). The new temporary sets had a Washington theme, and was meant to show that Washington is "a little broke" and needs "repair". Though the studio was reverted to its former self after the election week in 2016, the changes to the graphics were kept.

After a stretch of episodes filmed from Trevor Noah's apartment due to the COVID-19 pandemic, the show returned to a smaller studio at One Astor Plaza, the corporate headquarters of ViacomCBS in Times Square. The new studio had no audience, and a smaller, more intimate atmosphere with muted colors. In April 2022, The Daily Show returned to NEP Studio 52 with a revamped set, combining elements of the Times Square studio with a revamped version of its previous layout.

== Production ==
Jen Flanz serves as showrunner. The show's writers begin each day with a morning meeting where they review material that researchers have gathered from major newspapers, the Associated Press, cable news television channels and websites, and discuss headline material for the lead news segment. Throughout the morning they work on writing deadline pieces inspired by recent news, as well as longer-term projects. By lunchtime, Noah — who describes his role as that of the captain of a team — has begun to review headline jokes. The script is submitted by 3 pm, and at 4:15 there is a rehearsal. An hour is left for rewrites before a 6 pm taping in front of a live studio audience.

The Daily Show typically tapes four new episodes a week, Monday through Thursday, forty-two weeks a year. The show is broadcast at 11 PM Eastern/10 PM Central, a time when local television stations show their news reports and about half an hour before most other late-night comedy programs begin to go on the air. The program used to be rerun several times the next day, including a 7:30 PM Eastern/6:30 PM Central prime time broadcast.

From 2007 to 2024, full archive clips from the show under Jon Stewart's tenure were available on the Comedy Central website. In June 2024, the Comedy Central website was shut down in favor of the Paramount+ streaming service, where full episodes going back to Jon Stewart's return in February 2024 are available. Clips dating from the beginning of Trevor Noah's tenure to the present are available on the show's YouTube channel.

== List of hosts ==
Host	Start date	End date	Tenure	Episodes
Craig Kilborn	July 22, 1996	December 17, 1998	3 years, 148 days	386
Jon Stewart	January 11, 1999	August 26, 2015	16 years, 207 days	2,131
Trevor Noah	September 28, 2015	December 8, 2022	7 years, 71 days	1,091
Weekly guest hosts	January 17, 2023	December 14, 2023	331 days	87
Jon Stewart (Mondays) and rotating correspondents	February 12, 2024	present	2 years, 283 days	347

== History ==
=== Craig Kilborn's tenure (1996–1998) ===
The Daily Show was created by Lizz Winstead and Madeleine Smithberg and premiered on Comedy Central on July 22, 1996, having been marketed as a replacement for Politically Incorrect (a successful Comedy Central program that had moved to ABC earlier that year). Madeleine Smithberg was co-creator of The Daily Show as well as the former executive producer. A graduate of Binghamton University, she was an executive producer of Steve Harvey's Big Time and a talent coordinator for Late Night with David Letterman.

Aiming to parody conventional newscasts, it featured a comedic monologue of the day's headlines from anchor Craig Kilborn (a well-known co-anchor of ESPN's SportsCenter), as well as mockumentary style on-location reports, in-studio segments and debates from regular correspondents Winstead, Brian Unger, Beth Littleford, and A. Whitney Brown.

==== Common segments ====
Common segments included "This Day in Hasselhoff History" and "Last Weekend's Top-Grossing Films, Converted into Lira", in parody of entertainment news shows and their tendency to lead out to commercials with trivia such as celebrity birthdays. Another commercial lead-out featured Winstead's parents, on her answering machine, reading that day's "Final Jeopardy!" question and answer. In each show, Kilborn would conduct celebrity interviews, ending with a segment called "Five Questions" in which the guest was made to answer a series of questions that were typically a combination of obscure fact and subjective opinion. These are highlighted in a 1998 book titled The Daily Show: Five Questions, which contains transcripts of Kilborn's best interviews. Each episode concluded with a segment called "Your Moment of Zen" that showed random video clips of humorous and sometimes morbid interest such as visitors at a Chinese zoo feeding baby chickens to the alligators. Originally the show was recorded without a studio audience, featuring only the laughter of its own off-camera staff members. A studio audience was incorporated into the show for its second season, and has remained since.

==== Differences between Kilborn and Stewart versions ====
The show was much less politically focused than it later became under Jon Stewart, having what Stephen Colbert described as a local news feel and involving more character-driven humor as opposed to news-driven humor. Winstead recalls that when the show was first launched there was constant debate regarding what the show's focus should be. While she wanted a more news-driven focus, the network was concerned that this would not appeal to viewers and pushed for "a little more of a hybrid of entertainment and politics". The show was slammed by some reviewers as being too mean-spirited, particularly towards the interview subjects of field pieces; a criticism acknowledged by some of the show's cast. Describing his time as a correspondent under Kilborn, Colbert says, "You wanted to take your soul off, put it on a wire hanger, and leave it in the closet before you got on the plane to do one of these pieces." One reviewer from The New York Times criticized the show for being too cruel and for lacking a central editorial vision or ideology, describing it as "bereft of an ideological or artistic center ... precocious but empty."

==== Kilborn's departure ====
There were reports of backstage friction between Kilborn and head writer Lizz Winstead. Winstead had not been involved in the hiring of Kilborn, and disagreed with him over what direction the show should take. "I spent eight months developing and staffing a show and seeking a tone with producers and writers. Somebody else put him in place. There were bound to be problems. I viewed the show as content-driven; he viewed it as host-driven", she said. In a 1997 Esquire magazine interview, Kilborn made a sexually explicit joke about Winstead. Comedy Central responded by suspending Kilborn without pay for one week, and Winstead quit soon after.

In 1998, Kilborn left The Daily Show to replace Tom Snyder on CBS's The Late Late Show. He claimed the "Five Questions" interview segment as intellectual property, disallowing any future Daily Show hosts from using it in their interviews. Correspondents Brian Unger and A. Whitney Brown left the show shortly before him, but the majority of the show's crew and writing staff stayed on. Kilborn's last show as host aired on December 17, 1998, ending a 386-episode tenure. Reruns were shown until Jon Stewart's debut four weeks later. Kilborn made a short appearance on Jon Stewart's final edition of the Daily Show saying "I knew you were going to run this thing into the ground."

=== Jon Stewart's tenure (1999–2015) ===
==== Shift in content ====
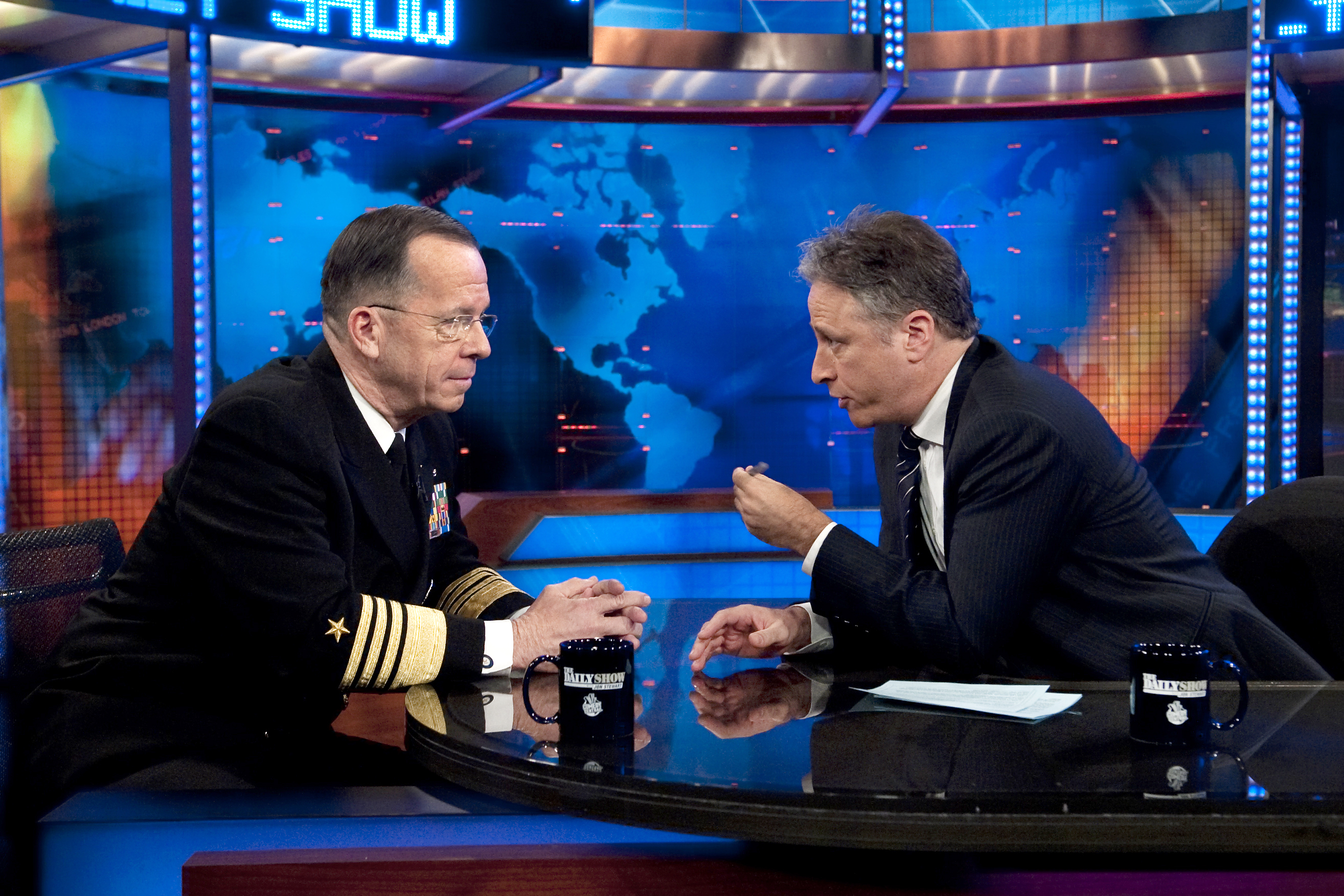
Jon Stewart (right) hosting an episode of The Daily Show in 2010 with Admiral Michael Mullen

Comedian Jon Stewart took over as host of the show, which was retitled The Daily Show with Jon Stewart, on January 11, 1999. Stewart had previously hosted Short Attention Span Theater on Comedy Central, two shows on MTV (You Wrote It, You Watch It and The Jon Stewart Show), as well as a syndicated late-night talk show, and had been cast in films and television. In taking over hosting from Kilborn, Stewart initially retained much of the same staff and on-air talent, allowing many pieces to transition without much trouble, while other features like "God Stuff", with John Bloom presenting an assortment of actual clips from various televangelists, and "Backfire", an in-studio debate between Brian Unger and A. Whitney Brown, evolved into the similar pieces of "This Week in God" and Stephen Colbert and Steve Carell's "Even Stevphen". After the change, a number of new features were developed. The ending segment "Your Moment of Zen", previously consisting of a random selection of humorous videos, was diversified to sometimes include recaps or extended versions of news clips shown earlier in the show. The show's theme music, "Dog on Fire" by Bob Mould, was re-recorded by They Might Be Giants after Stewart joined the show.

Stewart served not only as host but also as a writer and executive producer of the series. He recalls that he initially struggled with the Kilborn holdover writers to gain control of the show and put his own imprint on the show's voice, a struggle that led to the departure of a number of the holdover writers. Instrumental in shaping the voice of the show under Stewart was former editor of The Onion Ben Karlin who, along with fellow Onion contributor David Javerbaum, joined the staff in 1999 as head writer and was later promoted to executive producer. Their experience in writing for the satirical newspaper, which uses fake stories to mock real print journalism and current events, would influence the comedic direction of the show; Stewart recalls the hiring of Karlin as the point at which things "[started] to take shape". Describing his approach to the show, Karlin said, "The main thing, for me, is seeing hypocrisy. People who know better saying things that you know they don't believe."

Logo used for Stewart's tenure

Under Stewart and Karlin The Daily Show developed a markedly different style, bringing a sharper political focus to the humor than the show previously exhibited. Then-correspondent Stephen Colbert recalls that Stewart specifically asked him to have a political viewpoint, and to allow his passion for issues to carry through into his comedy. Colbert says that whereas under Kilborn the focus was on "human interest-y" pieces, with Stewart as host the show's content became more "issues and news driven", particularly after the beginning of the 2000 election campaign with which the show dealt in its "Indecision 2000" coverage. Stewart himself describes the show's coverage of the 2000 election recount as the point at which the show found its editorial voice. "That's when I think we tapped into the emotional angle of the news for us and found our editorial footing," he says. Following the September 11th attacks, The Daily Show went off the air for nine days. Upon its return, Stewart opened the show with a somber monologue, that, according to Jeremy Gillick and Nonna Gorilovskaya, addressed both the absurdity and importance of his role as a comedian. Commented Stewart:

They said to get back to work, and there were no jobs available for a man in the fetal position. ...We sit in the back and we throw spitballs – never forgetting the fact that it is a luxury in this country that allows us to do that. ...The view from my apartment was the World Trade Center. Now it's gone. They attacked it. This symbol of American ingenuity and strength and labor and imagination and commerce and it is gone. But you know what the view is now? The Statue of Liberty. The view from the south of Manhattan is now the Statue of Liberty. You can't beat that.

— Jon Stewart, The Daily Show, September 20, 2001

Gillick and Gorilovskaya point to the September 11 attacks and the beginning of the wars in Afghanistan and Iraq as the point at which Stewart emerged as a trusted national figure. Robert Thompson, the director of the Bleier Center for Television and Popular Culture at Syracuse University, recalled of this period, "When all the news guys were walking on eggshells, Jon was hammering those questions about WMDs."

==== Broadening the role of the correspondent ====
During Stewart's tenure, the role of the correspondent broadened to encompass not only field segments but also frequent in-studio exchanges. Under Kilborn, Colbert says that his work as a correspondent initially involved "character driven [field] pieces—like, you know, guys who believe in Bigfoot." However, as the focus of the show has become more news-driven, correspondents have increasingly been used in studio pieces, either as experts discussing issues at the anchor desk or as field journalists reporting from false locations in front of a green screen. Colbert says that this change has allowed correspondents to be more involved with the show, as it has permitted them to work more closely with the host and writers.

==== Popularity and critical respect ====
The show's 2000 and 2004 election coverage, combined with a new satirical edge, helped to catapult Stewart and The Daily Show to new levels of popularity and critical respect. Since Stewart became host, the show has won 23 Primetime Emmy Awards and three Peabody Awards, and its ratings steadily increased. In 2003, the show was averaging nearly a million viewers, an increase of nearly threefold since the show's inception as Comedy Central became available in more households. By September 2008, the show averaged nearly two million viewers per night. Senator Barack Obama's interview on October 29, 2008, pulled in 3.6 million viewers.

==== In the political spectrum ====
The move towards greater involvement in political issues and the increasing popularity of the show in certain key demographics have led to examinations of where the views of the show fit in the political spectrum. Adam Clymer, among many others, argued in 2004 that The Daily Show was more critical of Republicans than Democrats under Stewart. Rory Albanese called the audience of the show "very left-wing", and the show have also been described several times as generally left-leaning, but a study have not find signs of left-wing or liberal bias in the show, and Albanese noted that the show deliberately did not follow the expectations of the audience. Stewart, who voted Democratic in the 2004 presidential election, acknowledged that the show had a more liberal point of view, but that it was not "a liberal organization" with a political agenda and its duty first and foremost was to be funny. He acknowledged that the show is not necessarily an "equal opportunity offender", explaining that Republicans tended to provide more comedic fodder because "I think we consider those with power and influence targets and those without it, not." In an interview in 2005, when asked how he responded to critics claiming that The Daily Show is overly liberal, Stephen Colbert, also a self-proclaimed Democrat, said in an interview during the Bush administration, when the Republicans held a majority in the House and Senate: "We are liberal, but Jon's very respectful of the Republican guests, and, listen, if liberals were in power it would be easier to attack them, but Republicans have the executive, legislative and judicial branches, so making fun of Democrats is like kicking a child, so it's just not worth it."

Stewart was critical of Democratic politicians for being weak, timid, or ineffective. He said in an interview with Larry King, prior to the 2006 elections, "I honestly don't feel that [the Democrats] make an impact. They have forty-nine percent of the vote and three percent of the power. At a certain point you go, 'Guys, pick up your game.'" He has targeted them for failing to effectively stand on some issues, such as the war in Iraq, describing them as "incompetent" and "unable... to locate their asses, even when presented with two hands and a special ass map."

Karlin, then the show's executive producer, said in a 2004 interview that while there is a collective sensibility among the staff which, "when filtered through Jon and the correspondents, feels uniform," the principal goal of the show is comedy. "If you have a legitimately funny joke in support of the notion that gay people are an affront to God, we'll put that motherfucker on!"

On September 15, 2003, Senator John Edwards became the first candidate to announce that they were running for president on the show, causing Stewart to jokingly inform him that their show was "fake" and he might have to re-announce elsewhere. On November 17, 2009, Vice President Joe Biden appeared on the show, making him the first sitting vice president to do so. On October 27, 2010, President Barack Obama became the first sitting U.S. president to be interviewed on the show, wherein Obama commented he "loved" the show. Obama took issue with Stewart's suggestion that his health care program was "timid."

On December 16, 2010, after the United States Senate failed to pass and the media failed to cover the James Zadroga 9/11 Health and Compensation Act, which would provide health monitoring and financial aid to sick first responders of the September 11 attacks, Stewart dedicated the entire Daily Show broadcast that day to the issue. During the next week, a revived version of the bill gained new life, with the potential of being passed before the winter recess. Stewart was praised by both politicians and affected first responders for the bill's passage. According to Robert J. Thompson, Syracuse University professor of television, radio and film, "Without him, it's unlikely it would've passed. I don't think Brian Williams, Katie Couric or Diane Sawyer would've been allowed to do this."

==== Writers' strike ====
Due to the 2007–08 Writers Guild of America strike, the show went on hiatus on November 5, 2007. Although the strike continued until February 2008, the show returned to air on January 7, 2008, without its staff of writers. In solidarity with the writers, the show was referred to as A Daily Show with Jon Stewart rather than The Daily Show with Jon Stewart, until the end of the strike. As a member of the Writers Guild of America, Stewart was barred from writing any material for the show himself which he or his writers would ordinarily write. As a result, Stewart and the correspondents largely ad-libbed the show around planned topics.

In an effort to fill time while keeping to the strike-related restrictions, the show aired or re-aired some previously recorded segments, and Stewart engaged in a briefly recurring mock feud with fellow late-night hosts Stephen Colbert and Conan O'Brien. The strike officially ended on February 12, 2008, with the show's writers returning to work the following day, at which point the title of The Daily Show was restored.

==== Stewart's absence in 2013 ====
Starting in June 2013, Jon Stewart took a twelve-week break to direct Rosewater, a drama about a journalist jailed by Iran for four months. Correspondent John Oliver replaced Stewart at the anchor desk for two months, to be followed by one month of reruns. Oliver received positive reviews for his hosting, leading to his departure from the show in December 2013 for his own show Last Week Tonight with John Oliver, which debuted April 27, 2014, on HBO.

==== Stewart's departure ====
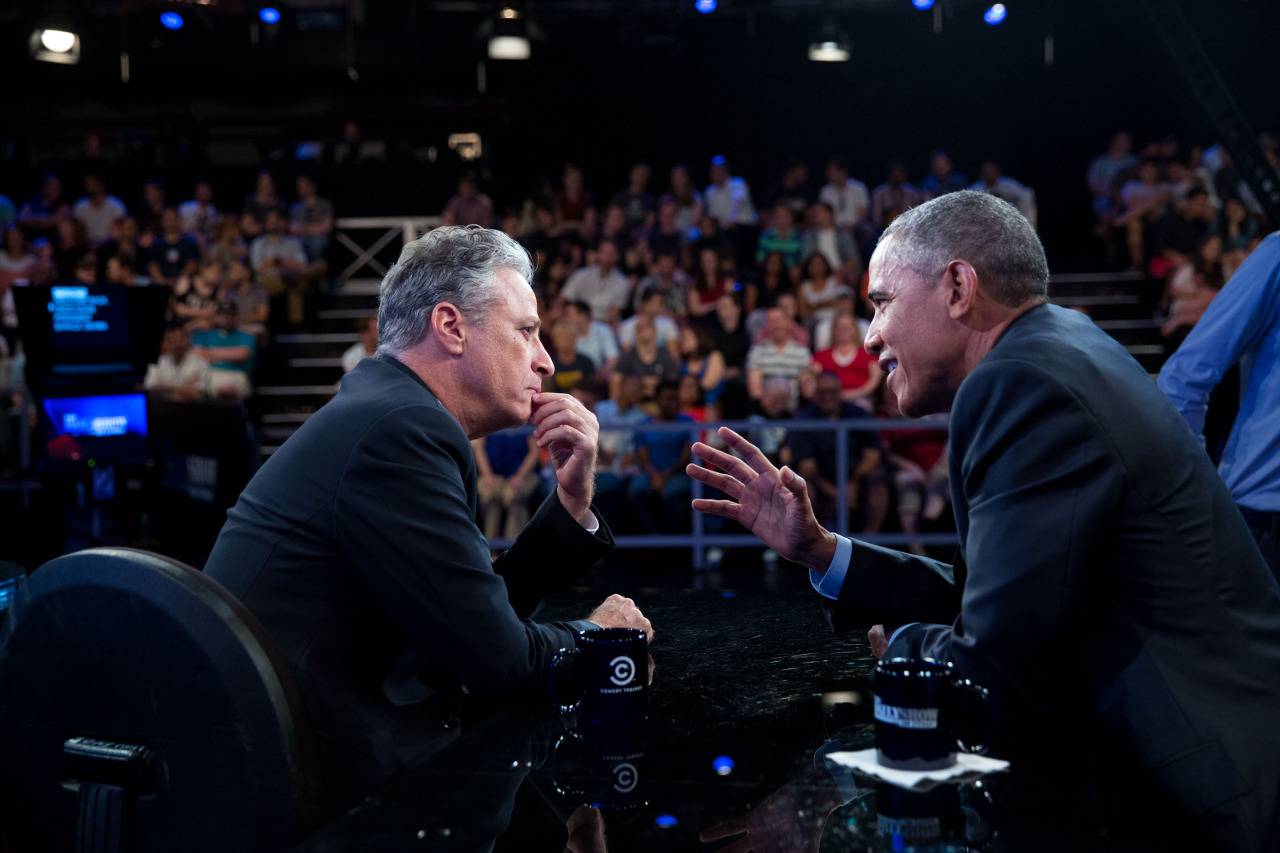
Barack Obama made his final appearance on the show with Jon Stewart as host on July 21, 2015.

On February 10, 2015, Stewart announced that he would be leaving the show later in the year. Comedy Central indicated in a statement that The Daily Show would continue without Stewart, saying it would "endure for years to come".

Stewart's final episode aired on August 6 as an hour-long special in three segments. The first featured a reunion of a majority of the correspondents and contributors from throughout the show's history as well as a pre-recorded "anti-tribute" (mocking Stewart) from several frequent guests and "friends" of the show. This included Bill O'Reilly, Hillary Clinton, John McCain, Lindsey Graham, Chris Christie, John Kerry, and Chuck Schumer. The second segment featured a pre-recorded tour of the Daily Show production facility and studio introducing all of the show's staff and crew. The final segment featured a short farewell speech from Stewart followed by the final "Moment of Zen" (being 'his own' moment of zen): a performance of "Land of Hope and Dreams" and "Born to Run" by Bruce Springsteen and the E Street Band.

=== Trevor Noah's tenure (2015–2022) ===
First logo used for Noah's tenure until September 2021

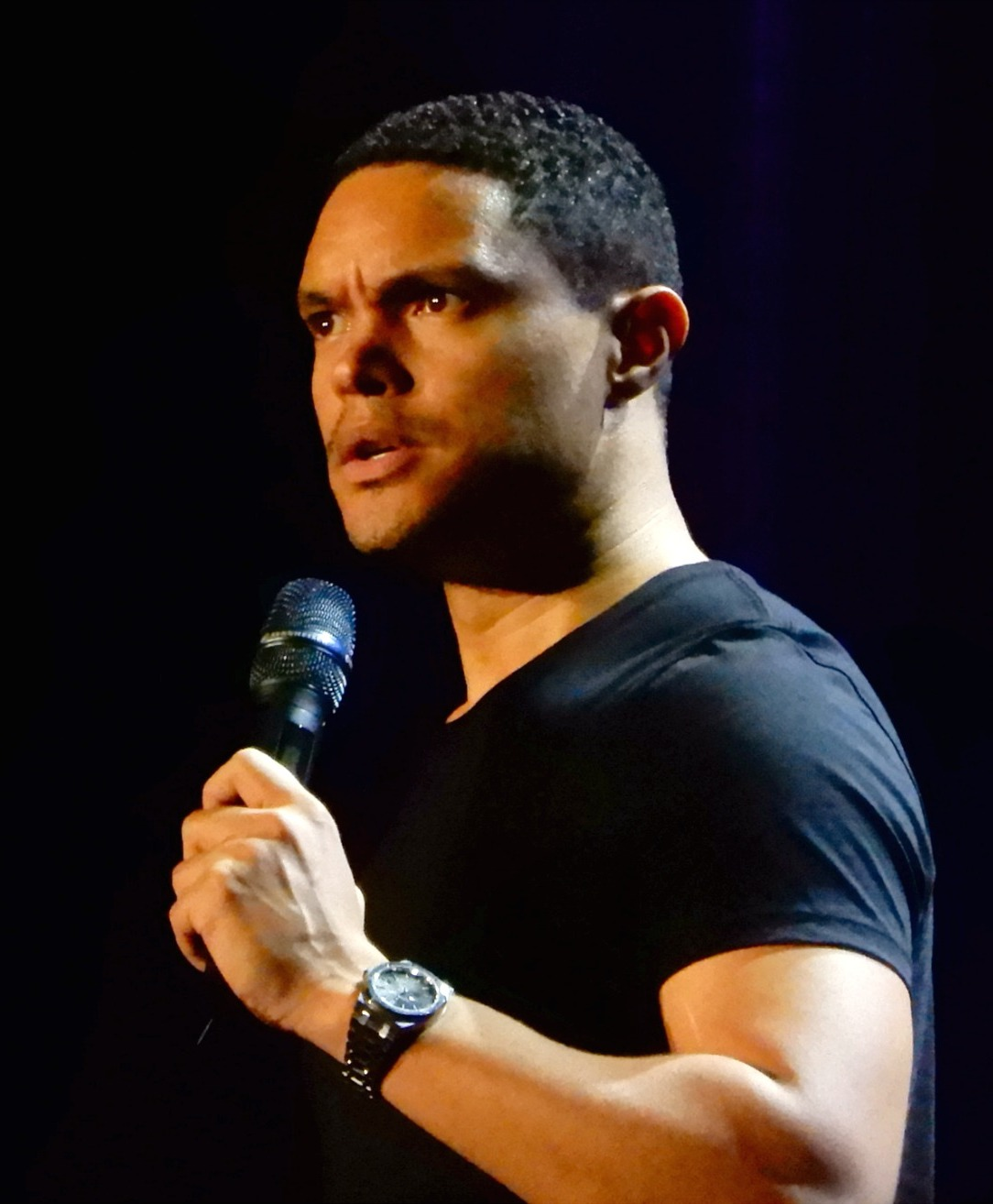
Trevor Noah was the show's host from 2015 until 2022.

On March 30, 2015, it was announced that South African comedian Trevor Noah would replace Stewart as host of The Daily Show. Shortly after his announcement, it was revealed that Amy Schumer, Louis C.K., Amy Poehler, and Chris Rock were all considered for the job. His first show was on September 28, 2015, with comedian Kevin Hart as his first guest. Noah's premiere episode was simulcast by Viacom on Comedy Central, the Nick at Nite block on Nickelodeon, Spike, MTV, MTV2, mtvU, VH1, VH1 Classic, BET, Centric, CMT, TV Land, Logo TV, and the NickMom block (last program to air) on the Nick Jr. Channel.

On September 14, 2017, it was announced that Comedy Central had extended Noah's contract as host of The Daily Show for five years, through 2022.

Ratings declined by about 37 percent at the beginning of Noah's tenure. They gradually increased from there, only to fall to the lowest ratings in 15 years in 2020. Some of the musicians that have been on the shows as guests performed their music as well. Starting in 2020 until the end of Noah's tenure, the show expanded to a 45-minute time slot.

On September 29, 2022, during a taping of the show, Noah announced that he would step down as the host of The Daily Show so he could focus on his stand-up career and touring. On October 2, 2022, it was confirmed that the show would continue on Comedy Central following Noah's departure. On October 12, 2022, it was announced that Noah's final episode would air on December 8. On October 18, 2022, it was announced that Comedy Central may replace Noah with more than one comedian.

==== Differences between Stewart and Noah versions ====
In addition to changes in the tone of the show, Noah also implemented stylistic changes to the show, with an updated set, new graphics and his monologue sometimes taking place while standing in front of a screen as opposed to sitting at the desk. Noah also increased the usage of more Millennial-based references, impersonations and characterizations for his comedy on the show, due to his younger demographic and his ability to speak in different accents and eight languages.

The debut of The Daily Show with Trevor Noah brought along three new correspondents: Roy Wood Jr., Desi Lydic and Ronny Chieng.

Additional correspondents were added in 2017. Michael Kosta became the Senior Constitutional Correspondent and Senior American Correspondent on July 11, 2017. Dulcé Sloan became the Senior Fashion Correspondent on September 7, 2017.

In January 2016, The Daily Show with Trevor Noah started to use a modified version of the show's previous theme, remixed by Timbaland and King Logan.

Noah also avoided talking enough about Fox News, as Stewart was previously known for. "The Daily Show was based on an emerging 24 hour news cycle, that's everything it was, that's what inspired The Daily Show. Now you look at news and it's changed. It's no longer predicated around 24 hour news. There are so many different choices. Half of it is online now. Now you've got the Gawkers, the BuzzFeeds. The way people are drawing their news is soundbites and headlines and click-bait links has changed everything. The biggest challenge is going to be an exciting one I'm sure is how are we going to bring all of that together looking at it from a bigger lens as opposed to just going after one source—which was historically Fox News," Noah said at a press conference before the show's debut.

==== Stewart visits The Daily Show with Trevor Noah; Jordan Klepper guest hosts ====
On December 8, 2015, former host Jon Stewart returned to The Daily Show for the first time in an extended-length show to return attention to extending the James Zadroga 9/11 Health and Compensation Act, otherwise referred to as 9/11 First Responders Bill, which Stewart explained had been blocked by Paul Ryan and Mitch McConnell for political reasons. On October 20, 2016, Noah was unable to host a scheduled taping of The Daily Show due to illness, so correspondent Jordan Klepper guest hosted.

On November 16, 2017, Stewart once again returned to The Daily Show, in part as a parody of the robocalls of fake Washington Post reporter "Bernie Bernstein" and to promote Night of Too Many Stars on HBO.

==== The Daily Social Distancing Show, expansion, move to Times Square ====
In March 2020 due to the COVID-19 pandemic, the show suspended production. On March 18, 2020, Comedy Central began to release webisodes of The Daily Show produced remotely from Noah's home, entitled The Daily Social Distancing Show. This format moved to television beginning March 23. Following the cancellation of Lights Out with David Spade, the Daily Show expanded into a 45-minute format beginning April 27, 2020. In July 2020, Comedy Central head Chris McCarthy told Vulture that there were plans to possibly extend the show to an hour-long format by the end of the year.

In May 2020, The Daily Show won the 2020 Webby Award for Humor in the category Social.

Second logo used for Noah's tenure until December 2022

The at-home format continued until June 2021, when the show went on an extended hiatus for the summer. The Daily Show returned on September 13, 2021, with the show re-located to studios at ViacomCBS's headquarters at One Astor Plaza in Times Square (its existing studio was being occupied by fellow Comedy Central program Tha God's Honest Truth). Comedy Central stated that the show planned to preserve the "intimacy and creative elements" of the home-based episodes. The program continued to be filmed with no studio audience; while there were plans to reinstate an audience, this was delayed due to concerns regarding Omicron variant.

In March 2022, it was announced that The Daily Show would go on a hiatus from March 18 to accommodate Noah's hosting of the Grammy Awards on April 3. On April 11, the show returned to Studio 52 with an audience and a redesigned studio.

=== Weekly guest hosts (2023) ===
On December 6, 2022, Comedy Central announced that until the next iteration of the show, The Daily Show would feature weekly celebrity guest hosts including Al Franken, Wanda Sykes, Leslie Jones, Hasan Minhaj, Sarah Silverman, Chelsea Handler, John Leguizamo, Marlon Wayans, Kal Penn, and D.L. Hughley, as well as both current and former correspondents. The show returned from hiatus on January 17 with Leslie Jones guest hosting through January 19. Jones was followed by Sykes, Hughley, Handler, and Silverman, each hosting a week through February 16. Correspondent Dulcé Sloan had her first and last guest hosting gig of this era on May 1, 2023, when it was cut short by the 2023 Writers Guild of America strike, bumping originally announced guest hosts Michael Kosta, Charlamagne tha God, Michelle Wolf, Ronny Chieng, Lewis Black, and Desus Nice.

On August 1, 2023, Variety reported that Minhaj was the primary possibility of a permanent replacement host. A day later, The Wrap reported that Penn was also a top candidate. The New Yorker reported that Minhaj had embellished details from his personal life in his stand-up material, which many believe led to a reconsideration of giving him the hosting job.

On September 27, 2023, following the 148-day strike, Comedy Central announced the show would return on October 16 with guest hosts and would not name a permanent host until 2024. The extension of the search for a permanent host has been attributed to the New Yorker article alleging factual inaccuracies in Minhaj's comedy routines.

=== Jon Stewart returns and correspondents (2024–present) ===
On January 24, 2024, it was announced that Jon Stewart would return as host for Monday night shows, while the remainder of the week would be hosted by the senior correspondents, beginning on February 12. Stewart accepted the single day a week contract deal as his initial run left him feeling exhausted. The producers of the show hope that Stewart will serve to cultivate and attract new talent to fill a full host role. In May 2024, it was announced that Stewart would additionally begin hosting The Weekly Show, an original podcast from Comedy Central. The senior correspondents began to regularly rotate as hosts. However, although Dulcé Sloan was a senior correspondent, she only hosted one week in this duty, and no longer lived in New York.

On July 14, 2024, in the wake of the attempted assassination of Donald Trump, Comedy Central announced that The Daily Show would not air live from Milwaukee, the host city for the 2024 Republican National Convention, and would preempt the Monday evening broadcast for July 15. The show returned to air on July 16, 2024, from its New York studio. In late October, it was announced that Stewart has extended his contract to host through 2025. In November 2025, he again extended his contract to host through 2026.

In October 2025, Stewart expressed support for Zohran Mamdani, a socialist politician who was running as the mayor of the New York City on a Democratic platform, during an interview episode of the show with him. In the course of the interview, Stewart called the attacks on Mamdani "Islamophobic" and called Mamdani's critics being "9/11" on him.

Since Stewart's return, the show has experienced ratings growth throughout the entire week. The show is even attracting younger viewers who have largely abandoned traditional TV.

On July 22, 2026, the show celebrated 30 years to the date since its first episode by airing a nearly 17-minute montage of chronological clips covering the major news stories during that time.

In October 2026, Stewart extended his contract to host through the 2028 elections.

== Correspondents, contributors and staff ==
The show's correspondents have two principal roles: experts with satirical senior titles that the main host interviews about certain issues, or hosts of field reporting segments which often involve humorous commentary and interviews relating to a current issue. The current team of hosting correspondents collectively known as "The Best F**king News Team" (formerly known as "The World's Fakest News Team" and previously "The Best F#@king News Team Ever") are Ronny Chieng, Michael Kosta, Jordan Klepper, Desi Lydic, and Josh Johnson. Troy Iwata and Grace Kuhlenschmidt are non-hosting correspondents. Contributors appear on a less frequent basis, often with their own unique recurring segment or topic. Current contributors include Lewis Black and Charlamagne tha God. Ben Karlin says that the on-air talent contribute in many ways to the material they perform, playing an integral role in the creation of their field pieces as well as being involved with their scripted studio segments, either taking part early on in the writing process or adding improvised material during the rehearsal.

The show has featured a number of well-known comedians throughout its run and is notable for boosting the careers of several of these. In 2006, The Onion editor-in-chief Scott Dikkers described it as a key launching pad for comedic talent, saying that "I don't know if there's a better show you could put on your resume right now." Steve Carell, who was a correspondent between 1999 and 2005 before moving on to a movie career and starring television role in The Office, credits Stewart and The Daily Show with his success. In 2005, the show's longest-serving correspondent, Stephen Colbert, became the host of the spin-off The Colbert Report, earning critical and popular acclaim. Colbert would host the program until he was chosen to replace David Letterman as host of CBS's Late Show in 2015. Ed Helms, a former correspondent from 2002 to 2006, also starred on NBC's The Office and was a main character in the 2009 hit The Hangover.

After filling in as host during Stewart's two-month absence in the summer of 2013, John Oliver went on to host his own show on HBO, Last Week Tonight with John Oliver. In 2016, former correspondent Samantha Bee launched her own late-night talk show Full Frontal with Samantha Bee. Bee's husband Jason Jones, also a former correspondent, served as executive producer for the show. Hasan Minhaj, the last correspondent hired during Stewart's tenure as host, left the show in 2018 to host Patriot Act with Hasan Minhaj on Netflix.

In June 2010, actress-comedian Olivia Munn began a tryout period on the show as a correspondent. Her credentials were questioned by Irin Carmon of the website Jezebel, who suggested that Munn was better known as a sex symbol than as a comedian. Carmon's column was denounced by Munn and the Daily Show's female writers, producers, and correspondents, 32 of whom posted a rebuttal on the show's website in which they asserted that the description of the Daily Show office given by the Jezebel piece was not accurate. Munn appeared as a Daily Show correspondent in 16 episodes, from June 2010 to September 2011.

Wyatt Cenac had a tumultuous tenure on the show, revealing in a July 2015 interview on WTF with Marc Maron, that his departure stemmed in part from a heated argument he had with Jon Stewart in June 2011 over a bit about Republican presidential candidate Herman Cain. However, Cenac did return for Stewart's final episode to bid him farewell and the two exchanged an intentionally awkward conversation.

=== Guest hosts ===
- Stephen Colbert, 11 episodes (January 24, 2001, Feb 20 & 22, 2001, Mar. 26–27, 2001, Apr 3 & 5, 2001, May 2–3, 2001, March 6, 2002, and July 6, 2004)
- Steve Carell, 7 episodes (February 21, 2001, Mar. 27–29, 2001, Apr 2 & 4, 2001, and May 1, 2001)
- Nancy Walls, 2 episodes (February 21, 2001, and March 29, 2001)
- Vance DeGeneres, 2 episodes (Feb. 26–27, 2001)
- Mo Rocca, 1 episode (February 27, 2001)
- Rob Corddry, 1 episode (February 9, 2006)
- John Oliver, 33 episodes (June 10, 2013 to August 15, 2013, and November 13, 2014)
- Samantha Bee and Jason Jones, 1 episode (October 7, 2014)
- Jordan Klepper, 5 episodes (October 20, 2016 and April 17–20, 2023; see also below)

After Trevor Noah's departure from The Daily Show at the end of 2022, the program engaged a series of guest hosts beginning in January 2023, each of which hosted four episodes. A permanent replacement was not named as of March 2024 until the show transitioned to a format with a Monday show led by Jon Stewart and the News Team rotating hosting from Tuesday through Thursday.

- Leslie Jones, 8 episodes (January 16–19 and November 13–16, 2023)
- Wanda Sykes, 4 episodes (January 23–26, 2023)
- D. L. Hughley, 4 episodes (January 30 – February 2, 2023)
- Chelsea Handler, 4 episodes (February 6–9, 2023)
- Sarah Silverman, 8 episodes (February 13–16 and November 6–9, 2023)
- Hasan Minhaj, 4 episodes (February 27 – March 2, 2023)
- Marlon Wayans, 4 episodes (March 6–9, 2023)
- Kal Penn, 8 episodes (March 13–16 and December 11–14, 2023)
- Al Franken, 4 episodes (March 20–23, 2023)
- John Leguizamo, 4 episodes (March 27–30, 2023)
- Roy Wood Jr., 4 episodes (April 3–6, 2023)
- Jordan Klepper, 6 episodes (April 17–20, November 16 and November 22, 2023)
- Desi Lydic, 5 episodes (April 24–27 and November 22, 2023)
- Dulcé Sloan, 2 episodes (May 1 and November 20, 2023)
- Michael Kosta, 4 episodes (October 16–20, 2023)
- Ronny Chieng, 2 episodes (October 19 and November 21, 2023)
- Desus Nice, 4 episodes (October 23–26, 2023)
- Charlamagne tha God, 8 episodes (October 30 – November 2 and December 4–7, 2023)
- News Team Takeover, 3 episodes (November 20–22, 2023)
- Michelle Wolf, 4 episodes (November 27–30, 2023)

== Reception ==
=== Ratings ===
Season	Nielsen rank	Nielsen rating	Tied with	
1995–96	7	0.1		
1996–97	9	0.2		
1997–98	9	0.3		
1998–99	7	0.4		
1999–2000	7	0.5		
2000–01	7	0.6		
2001–02	7	0.8		
2002–03	7	0.9		
2003–04	7	1.0		
2004–05	7	1.3		
2005–06	6	1.5	Last Call with Carson Daly	
2006–07	6	1.5		
2007–08	6	1.4		
2008–09	5	1.7	Jimmy Kimmel Live!	
2009–10	5	1.5	Late Night with Jimmy Fallon	The Colbert Report
2010–11	6	1.5		
2011–12	4	1.7	Late Night with Jimmy Fallon	
2012–13	5	1.6		
2013–14	5	1.5		
2014–15	6	1.3		

Television ratings from 2008 show that the program generally drew 1.45 to 1.6 million viewers nightly, a high figure for cable television. By the end of 2013 The Daily Show's ratings hit 2.5 million viewers nightly. In demographic terms, the viewership is skewed to a relatively young and well-educated audience compared to traditional news shows. A 2004 Nielsen Media Research study commissioned by Comedy Central put the median age at 35. During the 2004 U.S. presidential election, the show received more male viewers in the 18- to 34-year-old age demographic than Nightline, Meet the Press, Hannity & Colmes and all of the evening news broadcasts.

For this reason, commentators such as Howard Dean and Ted Koppel posited that Stewart served as a real source of news for young people, regardless of his intentions. In 2016, a New York Times study of the 50 TV shows with the most Facebook Likes found that The Daily Show was "most popular in cities and other more liberal-leaning areas along the coasts. Peak popularity is in San Francisco; it's least popular in Alabama".

From January 2014 to January 2023, The Daily Show lost 75% of its audience, averaging 570,000 nightly viewers, down from 2.2 million. During the same period, the average age of its viewership increased from 48.2 to 63.3, with only 30,000 viewers in the coveted 18–34 demographic per broadcast.

=== As a news source ===
The show's writers reject the idea that The Daily Show has become a source of news for young people. Stewart argues that Americans are living in an "age of information osmosis" in which it is close to impossible to gain one's news from any single source, and says that his show succeeds comedically because the viewers already have some knowledge about current events. "Our show would not be valuable to people who didn't understand the news because it wouldn't make sense," he argues. "We make assumptions about your level of knowledge that... if we were your only source of news, you would just watch our show and think, 'I don't know what's happening.'"

A 2006 study published by Indiana University tried to compare the substantive amount of information of The Daily Show against prime time network news broadcasts, and concluded that when it comes to substance, there is little difference between The Daily Show and other news outlets. The study contended that, since both programs are more focused on the nature of "infotainment" and ratings than on the dissemination of information, both are broadly equal in terms of the amount of substantial news coverage they offer.

As the lines between comedy show and news show have blurred, Jon Stewart has come under pressure in some circles to engage in more serious journalism. Tucker Carlson and Daily Show co-creator Lizz Winstead have chastised Stewart for criticizing politicians and newspeople in his solo segments and then, in interviews with the same people, rarely taking them to task face-to-face. In 2004, Winstead expressed a desire for Stewart to ask harder satirical questions, saying, "When you are interviewing a Richard Perle or a Kissinger, if you give them a pass, then you become what you are satirizing. You have a war criminal sitting on your couch—to just let him be a war criminal sitting on your couch means you are having to respect some kind of boundary." She has argued that The Daily Show's success and access to the youth vote should allow Stewart to press political guests harder without fearing that they will not return to the show. In 2010, Winstead had changed her views, commenting that since 2004, Stewart did some of the hardest-hitting interviews on TV. Stewart said in 2003 that he does not think of himself as a social or media critic and rejects the idea that he has any journalistic role as an interviewer.

During Stewart's 2004 appearance on CNN's Crossfire, Stewart criticized that show and said that it was "hurting America" by sensationalizing debates and enabling political spin. When co-host Carlson argued that Stewart himself had not asked John Kerry substantial questions when Kerry appeared on The Daily Show, Stewart countered that it was not his job to give hard-hitting interviews and that a "fake news" comedy program should not be held to the same standards as real journalism. "You're on CNN!" Stewart said, "The show that leads into me is puppets making crank phone calls! What is wrong with you?" Media critic Dan Kennedy says that Stewart came off as disingenuous in this exchange because "you can't interview Bill Clinton, Richard Clarke, Bill O'Reilly, Bob Dole, etc., etc., and still say you're just a comedian."

A 2004 study into the effect of The Daily Show on viewers' attitudes found that participants had a more negative opinion of both President Bush and then Democratic presidential nominee John Kerry. Participants also expressed more cynical views of the electoral system and news media. Political scientists Jody Baumgartner and Jonathan Morris, who conducted the study, state that it is not clear how such cynicism would affect the political behavior of the show's viewers. While disillusionment and negative perceptions of the presidential candidates could discourage watchers from voting, Baumgartner and Morris say it is also possible that discontent could prompt greater involvement and that by following the show, viewers may potentially become more engaged and informed voters, with a broader political knowledge.

Rachel Larris, who has also conducted an academic study of The Daily Show, disputes the findings of Baumgartner and Morris. Larris argues that the study measured cynicism in overly broad terms, and that it would be extremely hard to find a causal link between viewing The Daily Show and thinking or acting in a particular way. Bloggers such as Marty Kaplan of The Huffington Post argue that so long as Stewart's comedy is grounded in truth, responsibility for increased cynicism belongs to the political and media figures themselves, not the comedian who satirizes them.

Stewart himself says that he does not perceive his show as cynical. "It's so interesting to me that people talk about late-night comedy being cynical," he says. "What's more cynical than forming an ideological news network like Fox and calling it 'fair and balanced'? What we do, I almost think, is adorable in its idealism." Stewart has said that he does not take any joy in the failings of American government, despite the comedic fodder they provide. "We're not the guys at the craps table betting against the line," he said on Larry King Live. "If government suddenly became inspiring... we would be the happiest people in the world to turn our attention to idiots like, you know, media people, no offense."

In July 2009, Time magazine held an online poll entitled "Now that Walter Cronkite has passed on, who is America's most trusted newscaster?" Jon Stewart won with 44% of the vote, 15 points ahead of Brian Williams in second place with 29%. Stewart downplayed the results on the show, describing himself as the "none of the above" option.

In June 2013, the Writers Guild of America ranked The Daily Show with Jon Stewart #17 on their list of the 101 Best Written TV Series.

In December 2013, TV Guide ranked it #53 on its list of the 60 Best Series of All Time.

Stewart's return to the show in February 2024 initially attracted controversy due to the fact that Stewart devoted the majority of his first episode to criticizing Joe Biden and Donald Trump's age rather than focusing on policy differences between the candidates, calling both "vibrant" and "capable" and seemingly downplaying the overall significance of who won the election. This attracted significant criticism from a number of media figures, including Mary Trump, who accused Stewart of encouraging political apathy among voters with these statements.

=== Effectiveness ===
In late 2004, the National Annenberg Election Survey at the University of Pennsylvania ran a study of American television viewers and found that fans of The Daily Show had a more accurate idea of the facts behind the 2004 presidential election than most others, including those who primarily got their news through the national network evening newscasts and through reading newspapers. However, in a 2004 campaign survey conducted by the Pew Research Center those who cited comedy shows such as The Daily Show as a source for news were among the least informed on campaign events and key aspects of the candidates' backgrounds while those who cited the Internet, National Public Radio, and news magazines were the most informed. Even when age and education were taken into account, the people who learned about the campaigns through the Internet were still found to be the most informed, while those who learned from comedy shows were the least informed.

In a survey released by the Pew Research Center in April 2007, viewers who watch The Daily Show tend to be more knowledgeable about news than audiences of other news sources. Approximately 54% of The Daily Show viewers scored in the high knowledge range, followed by Jim Lehrer's program at 53% and Bill O'Reilly's program at 51%, significantly higher than the 34% of network morning show viewers. The survey shows that changing news formats have not made much difference on how much the public knows about national and international affairs, but adds that there is no clear connection between news formats and what audiences know. The Project for Excellence in Journalism released a content analysis report suggesting that The Daily Show comes close to providing the complete daily news.

== Awards and nominations ==
Under host Jon Stewart, The Daily Show rose to critical acclaim. It has received two Peabody Awards for its coverage of the 2000 and 2004 presidential elections. Between 2001 and 2024, it has been awarded 26 Primetime Emmy Awards in the categories of Outstanding Variety, Music, or Comedy Series (winner for 10 consecutive years from 2003 to 2012) and Outstanding Writing for a Variety, Music, or Comedy Program, and a further seven nominations. The show has also been honored by GLAAD, the Television Critics Association, and the Satellite Awards. America (The Book): A Citizen's Guide to Democracy Inaction, the 2004 bestseller written by Stewart and the writing staff of The Daily Show, was recognized by Publishers Weekly as its "Book of the Year", and its abridged audiobook edition received the 2005 Grammy Award for Best Comedy Album.

In September 2010, Time magazine selected the series as one of "The 100 Best TV Shows of All-TIME". In 2015, the show received its third Peabody Award for the show's "lasting impact on political satire, television comedy and even politics itself."

== Global editions ==
The Daily Show airs on various networks worldwide; in addition, an edited version of the show called The Daily Show: Global Edition was produced each week specifically for overseas audiences until mid-2020. It used to air outside of the United States on CNN International and other overseas networks beginning in September 2002. This edition ran for a half-hour and contained a selection of segments, including one guest interview from the preceding week's shows, usually from the Monday or Tuesday episode. Stewart provided an exclusive introductory monologue in front of an audience, usually about the week's prevalent international news story, and closing comments without an audience present. When aired on CNN International, the broadcast was prefaced by a written disclaimer: "The show you are about to watch is a news parody. Its stories are not fact checked. Its reporters are not journalists. And its opinions are not fully thought through." Since February 27, 2017, The Daily Show with Trevor Noah has been regularly simulcast on Black Entertainment Television.

Between 2001 and 2006, Westwood One broadcast small, ninety-second portions of the show to various radio stations across America.

In Canada, The Daily Show was aired on CTV Comedy Channel in simulcast with the Comedy Central airing. However, it was dropped in 2023, leaving the program without a Canadian television home, and exclusive to Paramount+. In August 2024, Corus Entertainment acquired the linear television rights to The Daily Show, with the program scheduled to move to Slice beginning on September 9, 2024.

In the United Kingdom and Ireland, the digital television channel More4 used to broadcast episodes of The Daily Show Tuesday through Friday evenings with the Global Edition, which is uncensored, airing on Mondays; regular episodes air the evening following their American airing. More4 was the first international broadcaster to syndicate entire Daily Show episodes, though they made edits to the program due to content, language, length or commercial references. The program was also available to watch via the internet video on demand service 4oD. However, the "toss" to The Colbert Report was usually included even though it was aired on FX, another channel. In addition, the placement of commercial breaks followed the British format, with one break midway through the show rather than several short breaks at various points. When The Daily Show was on hiatus, either re-runs or alternative content were aired. Since January 2011, only the Global Edition is broadcast. In July 2012 Comedy Central announced that The Daily Show would be shown on Comedy Central Extra in the same format as previously on More4, with episodes shown 24 hours after airing in the United States. The show aired on the channel from July 2012 to April 2015.

The Global Edition of the week of July 20, 2011, was not aired in the UK as it included a segment mocking Rupert Murdoch's appearance before the House of Commons Culture, Media and Sport Committee in relation to the News International phone hacking scandal. Parliamentary rules ban parliamentary proceedings from being broadcast in a satirical context. Stewart dedicated a segment of the show on August 2, 2011, to lampooning the censorship of the episode in Britain. In May that year, The Daily Show mocked the ban on using footage of the Royal Wedding in a satirical context with an animated video that showed Paddington Bear, Gollum and Adolf Hitler as guests at the wedding, and depicted its attendants engaging in various forms of violent and sexual behavior. Stewart later discussed the ban with guest Keira Knightley.

The Daily Show used to be aired in India on Comedy Central India.

The Daily Show aired on Australian Pay TV channel, The Comedy Channel, weeknights at 6:30pm. Free-to-air digital channel ABC2 began broadcasting the show without commercial breaks in March 2010, but discontinued in January 2011 when The Comedy Channel obtained exclusive rights; episodes were also available on the network's online service ABC iView shortly after airing. The Comedy Channel (as well as ABC2 during 2010) used to air the show together with The Colbert Report, and air both the Global Edition on Mondays and the regular edition Tuesday through Friday. The Global Edition was previously shown weekend late nights on SBS One before moving to Network TEN. The show now airs on 10 Shake (owned by Comedy Central parent ViacomCBS).

In North Africa and the Middle East, the Daily Show was broadcast on Showtime Arabia starting in 2008 and ending in 2015. When the show transitioned under Noah, OSN decided to wait a bit before airing the new show. Now, the Global Edition of Noah's show is broadcast on OSN's Comedy Central HD channel. Episodes are often edited if they contain topics deemed inappropriate for the region.

Episodes of the American version are also available online the next day at Comedy Central's official Daily Show website, although this service is not available in all countries. However, clips for UK and Ireland viewers became available on the UK Comedy Central website in December 2011.

=== The Daily Show: Nederlandse Editie ===
An official Dutch version of the show called The Daily Show: Nederlandse Editie (The Daily Show: Dutch Edition) premiered on the Dutch Comedy Central on January 31, 2011. The program is similar to the original, except with Dutch news and a Dutch view on international news. The show is hosted by comedian Jan-Jaap van der Wal, who was a team captain on Dit was het nieuws, the Dutch edition of Have I Got News for You. The first episode featured a guest appearance by Jon Stewart (recorded at the New York studio), who gave his official blessing for the show. This is also the first and still only franchise of The Daily Show. The 'Dutch Edition' didn't make it past the test run of 12 episodes due to lack of viewers.

== Spin-offs ==
=== The Colbert Report ===
A spin-off, The Colbert Report, was announced in early May 2005. The show starred former correspondent Stephen Colbert, and served as Comedy Central's answer to the programs of media pundits such as Bill O'Reilly. Colbert, Stewart, and Ben Karlin developed the idea for the show based on a series of faux television commercials that had been created for an earlier Daily Show segment. They pitched the concept to Comedy Central chief Doug Herzog, who agreed to run the show for eight weeks without first creating a pilot. The Colbert Report premiered on October 17, 2005, and aired following The Daily Show for nine years. Initial ratings satisfied Comedy Central and less than three weeks after its debut the show was renewed for a year. The Colbert Report was produced by Jon Stewart's production company, Busboy Productions.

In 2014, it was announced that Colbert would leave Comedy Central to host The Late Show with Stephen Colbert on CBS in 2015, following the retirement of David Letterman. The final episode of The Colbert Report aired on December 18, 2014.

=== The Nightly Show with Larry Wilmore ===
On May 9, 2014, it was announced that Larry Wilmore had been selected to host a show on Comedy Central to serve as a replacement for The Colbert Report. On January 19, 2015, Wilmore began hosting The Nightly Show with Larry Wilmore, a late-night panel talk show. It was produced by Busboy Productions. On August 15, 2016, Comedy Central announced that Wilmore's show had been cancelled. The show ended on August 18, 2016, with a total of 259 episodes.

=== The Opposition with Jordan Klepper ===
On April 4, 2017, Comedy Central announced a brand-new spinoff to occupy the 11:30 p.m. time slot which had not had an original show since the canceling of The Nightly Show with Larry Wilmore. The Daily Show's senior correspondent Jordan Klepper was enlisted as host, with Klepper, Stuart Miller, and Trevor Noah serving as executive producers. The show intends to "satirize the hyperbolic, conspiracy-laden noise machine that is the alternative-media landscape on both the right and left."

The show aired from September 25, 2017, to June 28, 2018. Comedy Central announced that Klepper would be hosting a new primetime weekly talk show, Klepper, which debuted in 2019.

=== The Daily Show: Ears Edition ===
In February 2018, The Daily Show: Ears Edition podcast was launched as companion piece to the main program, often featuring extended information and additional interviews. It replaced The Daily Show Podcast without Jon Stewart. In December 19, Comedy Central launched a 5-episode mini-series podcast called The Daily Show Podcast Universe.

=== Books ===
- The Daily Show's Five Questions from Comedy Central, published in 1998, is a book written by Craig Kilborn and other writers of The Daily Show that contains new material from the "Five Questions" segment.
- America (The Book): A Citizen's Guide to Democracy Inaction, published in 2004, is a book written by Jon Stewart and other writers of The Daily Show that parodies and satirizes American politics and worldview.
- Earth (The Book): A Visitor's Guide to the Human Race, published in 2010, is a book written by Jon Stewart and other writers of The Daily Show and is similar in style to America (The Book), but focuses on planet and human culture instead of the history of America.
- The Daily Show (The Book): An Oral History as Told by Jon Stewart, the Correspondents, Staff and Guests, published in 2016, is a book written by Chris Smith, a contributing editor at New York Magazine, and other members of the Daily Show family. The book chronicles the 16 years of The Daily Show with Jon Stewart.
- The Donald J. Trump Presidential Twitter Library, published in 2018, is a book written by Trevor Noah and other writers of The Daily Show that parodies and satirizes President Donald Trump's usage of his Twitter account.

== Influence ==
The Daily Show's satirical format has inspired international versions unaffiliated with Comedy Central.

- In Algeria, The Daily Show, broadcast on Comedy Central Algeria, was presented by Algerian comedian Abdelkarim Derraji. It premiered in June 2021.
- In Iran, the Persian-language satire program Parazit (meaning "static") was directly inspired by The Daily Show with the hosts even making a guest appearance on the January 20, 2011, episode of The Daily Show. Parazit was later succeeded by OnTen debuting on May 11, 2012.
- In Germany, the heute-show has aired on ZDF since 2009. The name is derived from the main ZDF news program heute (which means "today").
- In Egypt, the show Al Bernameg was modeled after The Daily Show as well. Host Bassem Youssef even imitated Jon Stewart's mannerisms, such as using his mug as a comedic prop. Youssef has appeared as a guest on The Daily Show multiple times.
- In India, On Air With AIB was modeled after The Daily Show, SNL, and Last Week Tonight.
- In Indonesia, Republik Mimpi was modeled after The Daily Show and Spitting Image
- In Iraq, Albasheer Show is a reduced version (with no celebrity interviews) and is hosted by the Iraqi journalist and comedian Ahmad Al-Basheer; commenting and criticizing local political issues.
- In Israel, the Daily Show was one of the main inspirations for Eretz Nehederet, a popular Israeli satire.
- In Portugal, during the 2009 legislative election campaign, Portuguese comedy group Gato Fedorento hosted Gato Fedorento Esmiúça os Sufrágios, a satirical news show modeled after The Daily Show's election coverage segments, which attracted immediate public attention after securing the key political candidates as guests.
- In Croatia, Montirani proces, a short-lived satirical program, heavily inspired by The Daily Show, ran for only six episodes in 2016, before being controversially cancelled by the newly appointed conservative administration of Croatian Radiotelevision.
- In Armenia: ArmComedy is a comedy show first aired in March 2012. It is aired thrice a week on ArmNews TV channel. Started as a satirical news website it later evolved into a web series on CivilNet Internet TV channel. After two years creators of the show were invited to expand to network television. ArmComedy became the "first satiric news show in Armenia dripped in political humor and wit, reporting the real news with a different perspective.". Every episode of ArmComedy is written and hosted by Armenian comedians Narek Margaryan and Sergey Sargsyan. It has been dubbed in press as "Armenia's version of The Daily Show".
- In Ukraine, ChistoNEWS is a comedy show that first aired in March 2012.
- In Belgium, De ideale wereld to be hosted by Ella Leyers.

== See also ==
- Comedy Central's Indecision 2000
- The Daily Show: Indecision 2004
- The Daily Show: Indecision 2006
- Comedy Central's Indecision 2008
- Jon Stewart–Jim Cramer conflict
- Inside Washington
- List of The Daily Show episodes
- List of The Daily Show writers
- The Mash Report hosted by Nish Kumar, a British news comedy show
- Real Time with Bill Maher
- Washington Week
- Who Made Huckabee?
- The ½ Hour News Hour
