= Iranian Canadians =

Canadians of Iranian descent

Iranian Canadians ایرانیان کانادایی
Total population
- 280,805 (2021 census) (Note: Total population with "Iranian" (200,465 persons) and "Persian" (80,340 persons) ethnic or cultural origin responses on the 2021 census.); 0.8% of the total Canadian population (2021); 262,625 (Persian-speaking Canadians); 0.7% of the total Canadian population (2021)

Regions with significant populations
- Richmond Hill, Toronto, North Vancouver, Montreal, Ottawa

Languages
- Persian, Canadian English, Canadian French Azerbaijani, Armenian, Kurdish, Mandaic, and other languages of Iran.

Religion
- Predominantly Shia Islam and Irreligion; Minorities include Agnosticism, Baháʼí Faith, Christianity (Protestantism and Catholicism), Judaism, Sunni Islam, Zoroastrianism and Mandaeism

Related ethnic groups
- Iranian diaspora (Iranians of UAE • Ajam of Bahrain • Ajam of Qatar • Ajam of Iraq • 'Ajam of Kuwait • Iranians of Canada • Iranians of America • Iranians of UK • Iranians of Germany • Iranians of Israel • Iranians in Turkey) Iranian Peoples (Lurs, Achomis, Baluchs, Kurds, Iranian Azeris), Turkic peoples (Qashqai, Azerbaijanis), Huwala

Iranian Canadians or Persian Canadians are Canadians of Iranian origin. From the 2016 Canadian census, the main communities can be found in Southern Ontario, British Columbia, and Quebec. As of 2016 a total of 97,110 Iranians reside in the Greater Toronto Area, 46,255 in the Greater Vancouver Area, and 23,410 in the Greater Montreal Area, with the remainder spread out in the other major cities of Canada, based on the 2016 Canadian Census. These numbers represent the people who stated "Iranian" as their single or joint ethnic origin in the census survey.

== Terminology ==
Iranian-Canadian is used interchangeably with Persian-Canadian, partly due to the fact that, in the Western world, Iran was known as "Persia". On the Nowruz of 1935, Reza Shah Pahlavi asked foreign delegates to use the term Iran, the endonym of the country used since the Sasanian Empire, in formal correspondence. Since then the use of the word "Iran" has become more common in the Western countries. This also changed the usage of the terms for Iranian nationality, and the common adjective for citizens of Iran changed from "Persian" to "Iranian". In 1959, the government of Mohammad Reza Pahlavi, Reza Shah Pahlavi's son, announced that both "Persia" and "Iran" could officially be used interchangeably. However the issue is still debated today.

While the majority of Iranian-Canadians come from Persian backgrounds, there is a significant number of non-Persian Iranians such as Azeris and Kurds within the Iranian-Canadian community, leading some scholars to believe that the label "Iranian" is more inclusive, since the label "Persian" excludes non-Persian minorities. The Collins English Dictionary uses a variety of similar and overlapping definitions for the terms "Persian" and "Iranian".

== Demography ==
=== Population ===
Iranian-Canadian Population History
Year	Pop.	±%
1981	5,600	—
1986	15,745	+181.2%
1991	43,210	+174.4%
1996	64,405	+49.1%
2001	88,220	+37.0%
2006	121,505	+37.7%
2011	163,290	+34.4%
2016	210,405	+28.9%
2021	280,805	+33.5%
Source: Statistics Canada

=== Immigration ===
The first known Iranian immigrant to Canada was Hakob Melik Vartanian (Persian: هاکوب ملیک وارتانیان) of Miandoab who was naturalised in Montreal, QC on 2 October 1905.

In 2021, there were 213,160 individuals in Canada who had been born in Iran, of which 70,395 had immigrated to Canada since 2011.

=== Religion ===
Among all Iranian-Canadians, 103,560 (49%) identified as Muslim. Among immigrants since 2011, about 39,860 (57%) identified as Muslim while most of the rest did not identify with any religion.

Iranian Canadian demography by religion
Religious group	2021 (Note: Religious breakdown proportions based on "Iranian" and "Persian" ethnic or cultural origin responses on the 2021 census.)		2001 (Note: Religious breakdown proportions based on "Iranian" ethnic or cultural origin responses on the 2001 census.)	
Religious group	Pop.	%	Pop.	%
Islam	123,045	43.82%	59,700	67.67%
Irreligion	120,250	42.82%	11,630	13.18%
Christianity	18,270	6.51%	6,565	7.44%
Judaism	1,235	0.44%	455	0.52%
Hinduism	240	0.09%	95	0.11%
Buddhism	220	0.08%	60	0.07%
Sikhism	150	0.05%	105	0.12%
Indigenous spirituality	35	0.01%	—N/a	—N/a
Other (primarily Zoroastrianism)	17,350	6.18%	9,610	10.89%
Total Iranian Canadian population	280,805	100%	88,220	100%

Iranian/Persian Canadian demography by Christian sects
Religious group	2021		2001	
Religious group	Pop.	%	Pop.	%
Catholic	5,100	27.91%	2,775	42.27%
Orthodox	870	4.76%	460	7.01%
Protestant	3,040	16.64%	1,765	26.88%
Other Christian	9,260	50.68%	1,565	23.84%
Total Iranian/Persian Canadian christian population	18,270	100%	6,565	100%

Religious demography of Canadian immigrants (Note: Does not those who don't have permanent residency (e.g study permit holder)) born in Iran
Period of immigration	Total	Islam		Irreligion		Christianity	
Period of immigration	Total	Pop.	%	Pop.	%	Pop.	%
Before 1980	2,320	505	22%	915	39%	350	15%
1980 to 1990	16,670	4,915	29%	7,010	42%	1,755	11%
1991 to 2000	41,215	16,120	39%	20,440	50%	1,990	5%
2001 to 2010	52,340	26,000	50%	22,135	42%	1,560	3%
2011 to 2015	44,740	24,985	56%	17,020	38%	1,265	3%
2016 to 2021	25,655	14,875	58%	8,765	34%	1,500	6%
Total	182,935	87,410		76,290		8,420	

Iranian Canadian demography by religion and gender (2021 census)
Religious group	Men		Women	
Religious group	Pop.	%	Pop.	%
Islam	59,920	42.14%	63,120	45.54%
Irreligion	63,745	44.83%	56,505	40.77%
Christianity	8,950	6.29%	9,325	6.73%
Total	142,205	50.64%	138,610	49.36%

== Geographical distribution ==
=== Provinces & territories ===
Iranian Canadians by province and territory (2001−2021)
Province/Territory	2021		2016		2011		2006		2001	
Province/Territory	Pop.	%	Pop.	%	Pop.	%	Pop.	%	Pop.	%
Ontario	155,855	1.11%	117,065	0.88%	92,635	0.73%	70,595	0.59%	51,775	0.46%
British Columbia	68,545	1.39%	47,985	1.05%	39,285	0.91%	29,265	0.72%	21,910	0.57%
Quebec	34,010	0.41%	25,530	0.32%	17,825	0.23%	12,370	0.17%	9,535	0.13%
Alberta	15,185	0.36%	13,925	0.35%	9,215	0.26%	5,835	0.18%	3,130	0.11%
Manitoba	2,010	0.15%	1,885	0.15%	1,265	0.11%	1,485	0.13%	630	0.06%
Saskatchewan	1,825	0.17%	1,340	0.13%	795	0.08%	630	0.07%	525	0.05%
Nova Scotia	1,640	0.17%	1,405	0.15%	1,240	0.14%	805	0.09%	390	0.04%
New Brunswick	845	0.11%	670	0.09%	445	0.06%	380	0.05%	185	0.03%
Newfoundland and Labrador	535	0.11%	215	0.04%	180	0.04%	60	0.01%	35	0.01%
Prince Edward Island	270	0.18%	295	0.21%	335	0.24%	15	0.01%	25	0.02%
Northwest Territories	45	0.11%	60	0.15%	55	0.13%	45	0.11%	20	0.05%
Nunavut	20	0.05%	20	0.06%	0	0%	10	0.03%	10	0.04%
Yukon	20	0.05%	15	0.04%	20	0.06%	10	0.03%	45	0.16%
Canada	280,805	0.77%	210,405	0.61%	163,290	0.5%	121,505	0.39%	88,220	0.3%

==== British Columbia ====
- North Vancouver (District)
- North Vancouver (City)
- West Vancouver
- Burnaby
- Coquitlam

==== Ontario ====
- Richmond Hill
- Vaughan
- Markham
- Thornhill

== Islamic republic politicians/sympathizers ==
In 2022, Canada banned ten thousand IRGC seniors and officers from entry. Iranian celebrities and government former ministers and officials are often mentioned in the news residing or traveling in Canada as well.

During the 2025–2026 Iranian protests and the ensuing massacres and diaspora protests, it was reported on 4 February 2026 that human rights advocates in Canada urged the RCMP to investigate the IRGC officials living in Canada who are linked to the repression of protesters and crimes against humanity. The Canadian Senate held a hearing on 10 February and discussed Islamic Republic agents and affiliates living freely in Canada.

== Notable Canadians of Iranian descent ==
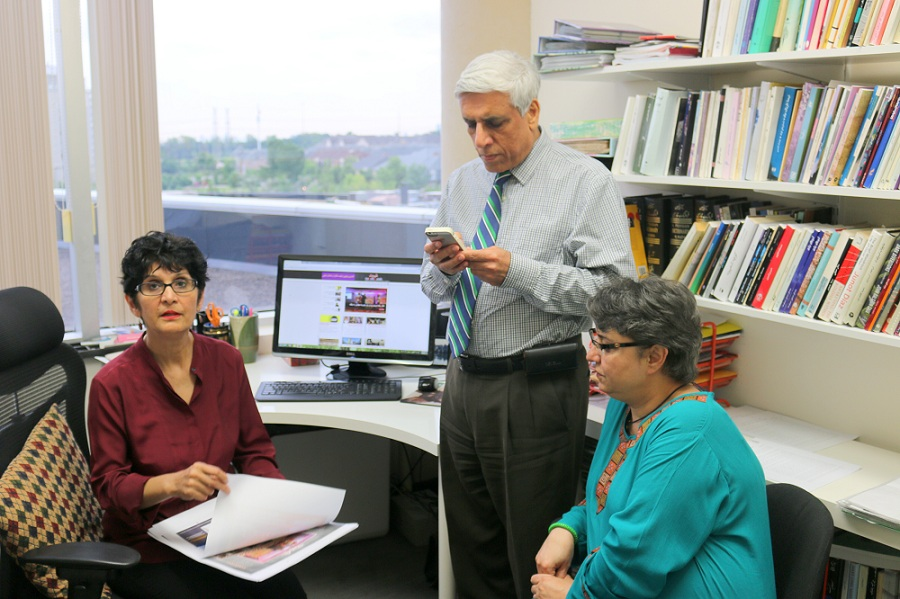
Editorial team of Shahrvand weekly in Toronto, the largest Persian newspaper in Canada

=== Academia ===
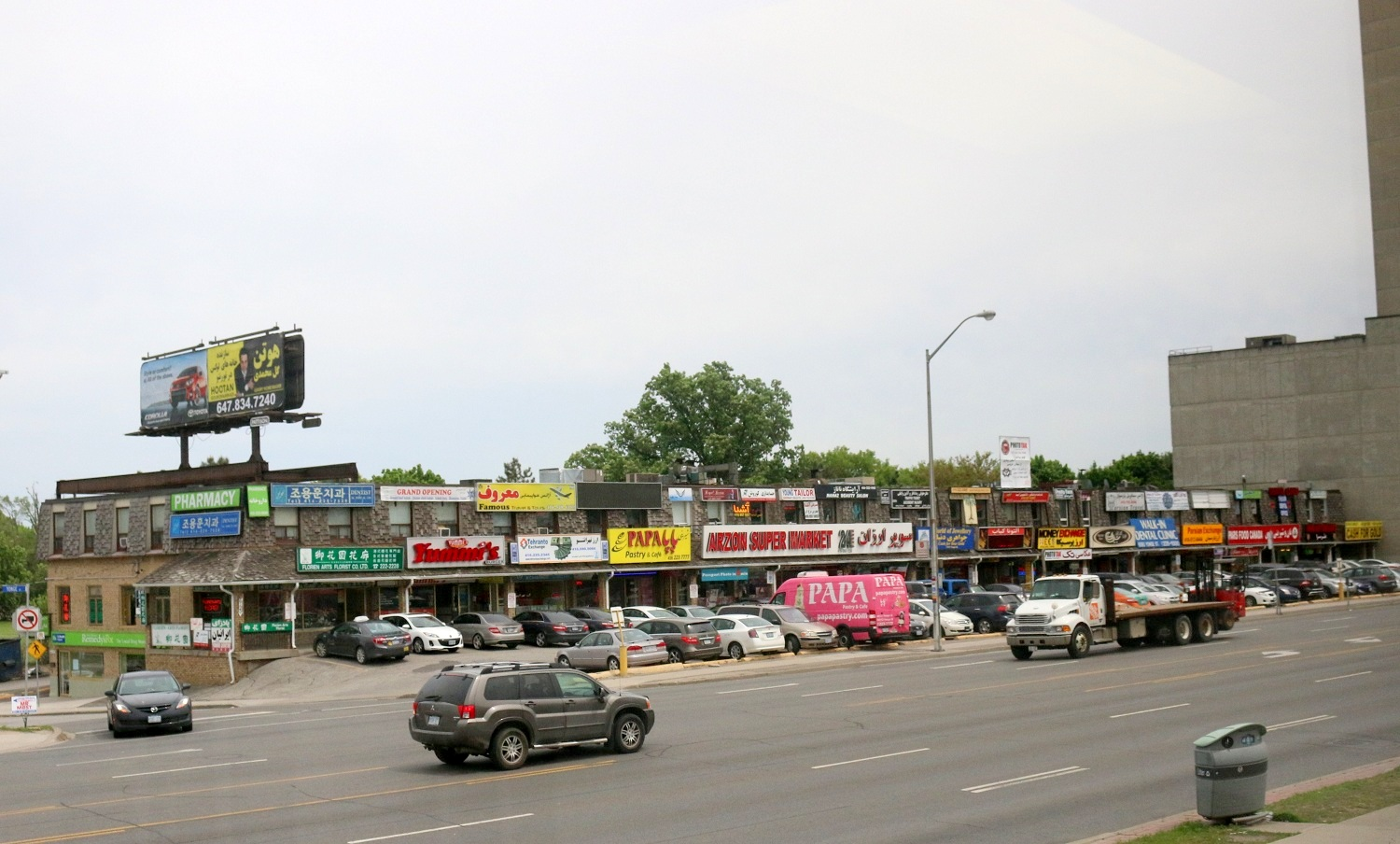
Little Persia on Yonge Street at North York, 2014

- Payam Akhavan, pioneer in international criminal law and leading human rights advocate; McGill University
- Kaveh Farrokh, historian
- Ramin Jahanbegloo, philosopher and university professor
- Ali Khademhosseini, Associate Professor of Medicine; Harvard-MIT Division of Health Sciences and Technology
- Shahrzad Mojab, Professor of Leadership, Higher and Adult Education; University of Toronto
- Reza Zadeh, computer scientist; Stanford University

=== Art and literature ===
- Anahita Akhavan, painter
- Hossein Amanat, architect, urban designer
- Reza Baraheni, novelist, poet, critic, and political activist
- Marjan Farsad, animator, illustrator, singer, and songwriter
- Ila Firouzabadi, artist and screenwriter
- Hollay Ghadery, writer
- Jian Ghomeshi, member of Moxy Früvous; former host of CBC's play; former host of Q on CBC Radio 1
- Siamak Hariri, architect
- Nazanine Hozar, writer
- Ramin Karimloo, West End performer, playing the lead role in Andrew Lloyd Webber's The Phantom of the Opera and the sequel Love Never Dies
- Mostafa Keshvari, director and writer
- Navid Khonsari, video game, film and graphic novel creator, writer, director and producer
- Fariborz Lachini, music composer
- Nima Mazhari, painter, photographer and husband of ex-Olympic biathlete Myriam Bédard, convicted and sentenced in June 2007 for stealing paintings from the late painter Ghitta Caiserman
- Sanaz Mazinani, photographer and curator
- Sirak Melkonian, painter
- Kaveh Nabatian, musician and filmmaker
- Marina Nemat, author
- Roza Nozari, writer and artist
- Ghazal Omid, nonfiction political writer, nonfiction children's book writer, speaker, NGO executive
- Fariborz Sahba, architect
- Bardia Sinaee, poet
- Parviz Tanavoli, sculptor and painter

=== Beauty pageants ===
- Nazanin Afshin-Jam, Miss Canada 2003, first runner-up of Miss World 2003, actress, singer-songwriter, human rights activist; wife of former Canadian Defence Minister Peter MacKay
- Ramona Amiri, Miss World Canada 2005, semifinalist of Miss World 2005
- Samantha Tajik, Miss Universe Canada 2008

=== Business ===
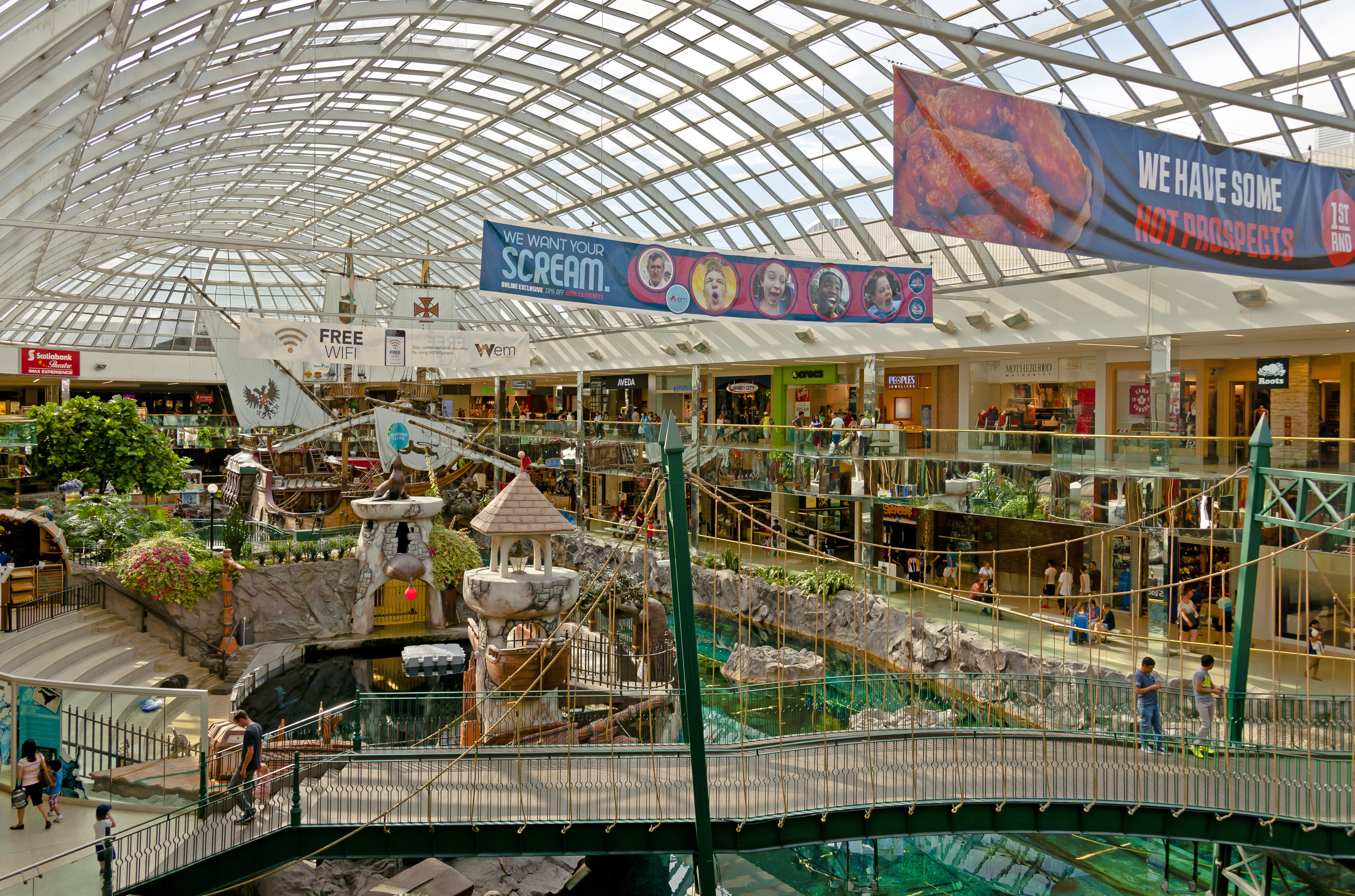
The Ghermezians, an Iranian-Canadian family, own the West Edmonton Mall.

- Shahin Assayesh, publisher
- Ghermezian family, billionaire shopping mall developers
- Karim Hakimi, founder of Hakim Optical
- Hassan Khosrowshahi, founder of Future Shop
- Michael Latifi, founder of Sofina Foods Ltd and owner of Nidala (BVI) Limited which holds a share in the McLaren Group.
- Sam Mizrahi, real estate developer
- Shahrzad Rafati, founder of BroadbandTV Corp

=== Crime ===
- Omid Tahvili, kingpin and international fugitive

=== Entertainment ===
- Izad Etemadi, actor, playwright and comedian
- Alireza Kazemipour, screenwriter
- Shervin Kermani, film director
- Alireza Khatami, filmmaker
- Pirouz Nemati, actor and screenwriter (Universal Language)
- Mehdi Sadaghdar, YouTube personality, electrical engineer
- Ava Maria Safai, film director
- Mani Soleymanlou, actor and playwright

=== Journalism ===
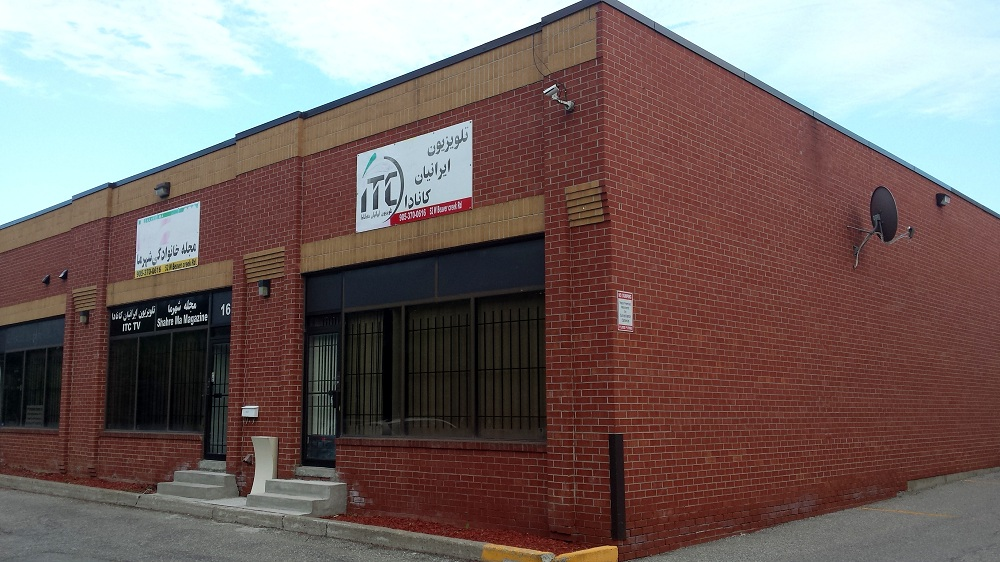
ITC TV, one of the Persian-language TV stations in Toronto

Various Persian-language media (including TV and newspapers) are active in Canada, including Shahrvand and Salam Toronto, which cover local events as well.

- Maziar Bahari, journalist
- Farid Haerinejad, CBC former producer, documentary maker, and editor-in-chief of Radio Zamaneh
- Shaya Goldoust, journalist, podcaster, radio host
- Zahra Kazemi, photojournalist
- Nikahang Kowsar, cartoonist
- Touka Neyestani, cartoonist

=== Politicians ===
- Ali Ehsassi, Federal Liberal MP for Willowdale, lawyer
- Goldie Ghamari, Progressive Conservative Former Ontario Provincial MP for Carleton
- Majid Jowhari, Federal Liberal MP for Richmond Hill, engineer
- Amir Khadir, Québec solidaire Former MNA for Mercier, microbiologist
- Reza Moridi, Ontario Liberal Former MPP for Richmond Hill, physicist, engineer

=== Sport ===
- Nicholas Latifi, Formula One driver for Williams Grand Prix Engineering
- Khashayar Farzam, Powerlifter and Physician

=== Technology ===
- Behdad Esfahbod, programmer and creator of the HarfBuzz text shaping engine

== See also ==
- Azerbaijani Canadians
- Armenian Canadians
- Canadian Society of Iranian Engineers and Architects-Ottawa
- Iranian diaspora
- Kurds in Canada
- Middle Eastern Canadians
- West Asian Canadians
