= Forced Confessions =

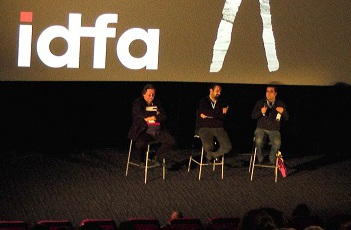
- World Premiere of Forced Confessions in Amsterdam
- Directed by: Maziar Bahari
- Screenplay by: Maziar Bahari
- Produced by: Maziar Bahari for Off-Centre Productions
- Cinematography: John Templeton
- Edited by: James Mullett
- Music by: Nainita Desai; Malcolm Laws
- Release date: 2012
- Running time: 58 minutes
- Country: England
- Languages: English and Persian

Forced Confessions (Persian: اعترافات اجباری, Eterafate-e Ejbari) is a 2012 documentary film by the Persian Canadian journalist and filmmaker Maziar Bahari about the forced confessions in Iran obtained from a suspect through torture.

The film premiered at the 25th International Documentary Film Festival Amsterdam (IDFA) in November 2012. The short version of the film was aired by BBC Persian TV simultaneously.

== Synopsis ==
In 2009, filmmaker Maziar Bahari, a guest of honor at IDFA 2007, claimed he was forced to make a false confession that he had been collaborating with the West and committed espionage. The story is told via the director's voice-over and interviews with other Iranians who have gone through similar experiences of forced confessions.
