= Young Journalists Club =

Iranian state media outlet

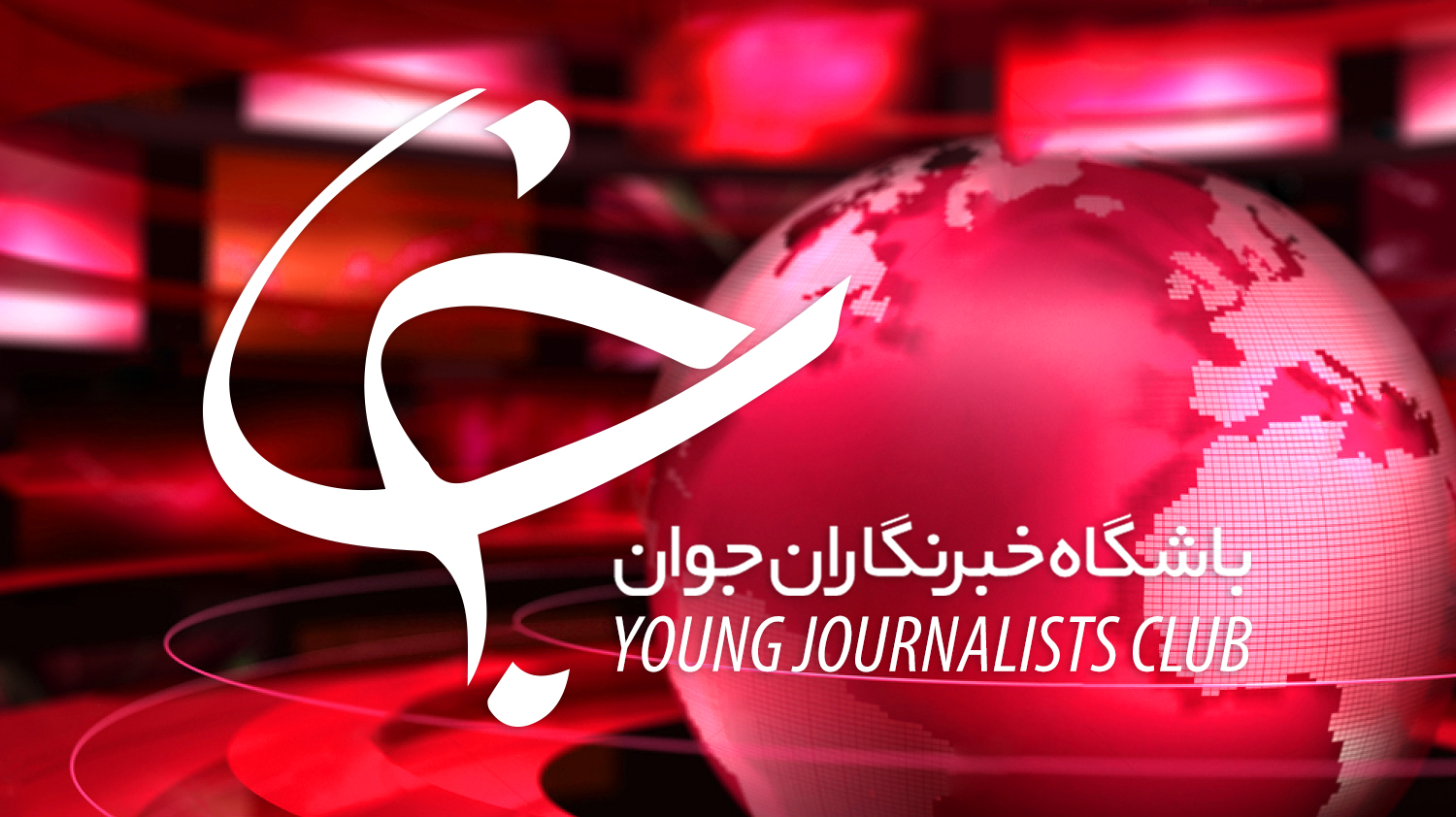
- Type: News agency
- Founded: 1999
- Headquarters: Tehran, Iran
- Key people: Mohammad Saleh Meftah (president)
- Website: yjc.ir

Young Journalists Club (YJC) (Persian: باشگاه خبرنگاران جوان) is an Iranian news agency affiliated with the Islamic Republic of Iran Broadcasting (IRIB) state broadcaster.

== History and management ==
Young Journalists Club was founded in 1999 and operates in all provinces of Iran under IRIB's political bureau. The outlet trains journalists and functions as an incubator for IRIB television and radio. Young Journalists Club's president has in recent years been appointed by IRIB's deputy political director; the current president is Mohammad Saleh Meftah, who was appointed in October 2024. According to RFE/RL in 2021, the outlet's managers had ties to the Islamic Revolutionary Guard Corps.

In 2022, it was reported that Young Journalists Club would be dissolved and merged into other IRIB departments, however this did not occur, with Young Journalists Club stating the claim was based on a misconception of its standing within IRIB.

== Content ==
Young Journalists Club has been involved in producing and airing forced confessions, as well as content for domestic security services. In 2012, Human Rights Watch criticized the outlet for publishing personal attacks against BBC Persian employees. In 2019, it along with some other Iranian news agencies was suspended from Twitter due to alleged coordinated harassment of Baháʼí practitioners; Young Journalists Club blamed the British government for supposedly pressuring Twitter over their reporting of Iran seizing a British-flagged tanker.

In 2018, it was among the top five most popular news sites in Iran according to Alexa rankings.
