= Paint the Change =

Paint the Change is a public art organisation that raises social issues through creativity and community engagement. The organisation has produced more than 50 murals and workshops on every continent. Today it works with schools, cultural institutions, city councils, creative agencies and corporations to promote social justice through art.

One of the project's latest murals is a four-storey crowdsourced mural celebrating the UK's National Health Service – featuring more than 200 flowers drawn by members of the public – in partnership with Rich Mix cultural foundation and community hub in the London Borough of Tower Hamlets, at 35-47 Bethnal Green Road, London E1 6LA. The mural was designed by the French street artist Matt "ATMA" Dufour. The organisation is also producing a large mural in Nairobi, Kenya, tackling COVID-19 and vaccine disinformation.

A previous project, featuring a monumental piece in Shoreditch, East London, displaying a poem by Ben Okri and art by Ben Eine to commemorate the victims and survivors of the Grenfell Tower fire in London, was produced in 2017.

The project was started by the Iranian-Canadian journalist, Maziar Bahari, whose story was told by Jon Stewart in the 2014 film Rosewater, to raise awareness of the denial of higher education to the Baháʼí religious minority in Iran.
