= Then They Came for Me =

2011 memoir by Maziar Bahari

- Author: Maziar Bahari
- Language: English
- Subject: memoir, imprisonment, Iran
- Genre: Biography
- Publisher: Random House
- Publication date: 2011
- Publication place: Canada
- Pages: 384
- ISBN: 978-1-4000-6946-0

Then They Came for Me: A Family's Story of Love, Captivity, and Survival is a memoir by Iranian Canadian journalist Maziar Bahari with Aimee Molloy, chronicling Bahari's family history, and his arrest and 118-day imprisonment following the controversial 2009 Iran presidential election. It was published by Random House in 2011.

It was developed into a film called Rosewater in 2014.

== Content ==
Iranian-born but living in the West since college, Bahari is in Iran to cover the 2009 presidential election and staying with his elderly mother in Tehran. He witnesses the massive support, enthusiasm and optimism of the reformist presidential campaign; the outrage and protest of reformist voters after the election results shows their candidate(s) losing by an improbably large margin; and the often brutal crackdown of the regime against the protesters and sometimes innocent bystanders.

Bahari is anxious to get back to London to be with his pregnant fiancée, Paola (who tells him "Come home, Mazi. We need you"), but not worried about running afoul of the Islamic regime as (he thinks) he has all the necessary accreditations and has taken all the recommended precautions to avoid trouble. From his father he has heard harrowing tales of prison torture and misery under the Shah, and he has visited his sister in prison in the 1980s during the early years of the Ayatollah Khomeini regime. When he is arrested on June 21 at his mother's house, Bahari first believes it must be a mistake and he will soon be released.

=== Imprisonment ===
Bahari is taken to Tehran's notorious Evin Prison, given a small, bare cell which he leaves only for short exercise periods and much longer interrogation sessions. His arrester and regular interrogator (whom Bahari nicknames "Rosewater" for his fragrance of choice), is a large man who explodes into rage without warning, slapping and beating Bahari, sometimes aggravating his migraine headaches until it feels like his "head was going to explode." Using psychological or "white" torture, Rosewater threatens Bahari with the possibility of "every tactic necessary" to make him talk, including interrogation up to fifteen hours a day for four to six years. Bahari is told he will rot in prison (until the jailers "put your bones in a bag and throw it at your mother's doorstep!"), or is soon to be executed as an example to others (I will make sure you die before Ramadan, Mazi, ... but I will also make sure that I smash your handsome face first). Bahari is assured he was "forgotten" and serving time for people who are laughing at you.' ("There are campaigns for everyone in this prison – even the most unknown of the prisoners – but nothing for you" he laughed). When this turns out not to be the case and he is allowed to call his wife, Rosewater listens in and mocks Bahari's declarations of love to his wife.

These threats and beatings are sometimes combined with blandishments, such as offers of Nescafé instant coffee and fruit, and promises that "we are going to be friends". On a couple of occasions his jailers proudly proclaim their "Islamic kindness," and on another he is asked rhetorically after weeks of beatings by Rosewater, "have I ever tortured you?" (obviously expecting "no" for an answer). Occasionally Bahari would be startled by his interrogators' ignorance of politics and culture outside the Islamic Republic. He is accused of being an agent of four foreign intelligence organizations: CIA, MI6, Mossad, and Newsweek. Rosewater is fixated on the American state of New Jersey as "famous". Following the premise that mixing of the sexes must inevitably lead to illicit sex, Rosewater spends much time hoping to shame Bahari by forcing him to list women he had worked with.

Compounding Bahari's suffering was the guilt he felt not only over his pregnant fiancée alone in London, but also over the suffering of his 80+ year old widowed mother who lived alone and whose daughter had died five months earlier. All these facts his jailers reminded him of:

We do not want to harm you. We do not want your wife to raise the child alone. I do not want your child to grow up an orphan. Is it a boy or a girl? ... And you have a mother who has lost two children and her husband in the past four years.'

Beatings and interrogation alternate with stretches of solitary confinement in a windowless cell during which Bahri fears he is going crazy.

"I couldn't escape from the loneliness of solitary confinement, not even in sleep. I would dream about sitting in my cell alone for days, forgotten and abandoned. I would cry for help and try to open the door, but no one could hear me. My cries often woke me up, and seeing the locked metal door, I didn't know if I was awake or still trapped in the dream. This went on for days, and I prayed for Rosewater to call me, even to beat me. At least it was human contact."

During his ordeal Bahari carried on imaginary conversations with his dead father and sister, both former political prisoners. His father (i.e. his memory of his father) urging him to be courageous and offered advice on outsmarting the interrogator. One night Bahari dreams of a song of Leonard Cohen and later called the song his secret weapon against his interrogators:

"Oh the sisters of mercy, they are not departed or gone.

They were waiting for me when I thought that I just can't go on. And they brought me their comfort and later they brought me this song.

I don't know how long the dream lasted, but I didn't want it to end. I knew what emotions awaited me when I woke up – the fear, the shame, the hatred – and I wanted this feeling to last forever. I felt better. I felt safe. And, though only in my dream, I once again felt free."

Desperate to get out, Bahari agrees to video confessions of the wickedness of Western media, but holds out against "naming names", i.e. incriminating individual politicians or journalists, giving information that "would harm my contacts or the people close to me."

He is held on in prison to give these names, but as his interrogation leads nowhere, and pressure to release him from his wife, Newsweek magazine, and US Secretary of State Hillary Clinton mounts, Bahari is transferred to a far more comfortable group cell with other political prisoners. He promises his jailers he will help spy for the Revolutionary Guard (who arrested and interrogated him) after his release, and is given a "partial list" of dozens of journalists and opposition activists inside and outside Iran to monitor. With a three billion rials ($300,000) bail, a signed promise to report to the Guard every week about the activities of the "anti-revolutionary elements", and repeated threats that the Guard will bring him back to Iran "in a bag" if he reneges, Bahari is finally released on October 17, 2009 and flies back to London.

=== Epilogue ===
Back in London enjoying his newborn daughter and no longer suffering from nightmares of prison, Bahari begins a series of interviews for television, radio, print, emphasizing that

1. "I had made my confessions under duress, and
2. hundreds of innocent prisoners remained inside Iranian jails, enduring the same brutal ordeal I had."

The Guard respond with threats to his family, although his mother's resolute contempt for these ashghals (garbage) makes her a difficult target. Bahari is "tried" in absentia by a revolutionary court (no court session or information provided to his lawyer) and sentenced to thirteen and a half years' imprisonment plus 74 lashes.

Bahari ends by giving his thoughts on Supreme Leader Ali Khamenei (the one Iranian now blamed "for the rapes, tortures, and murders" rather than Mahmoud Ahmadinejad); non-violence (the only effective tactic against the regime); a possible US or Israel attack on Iran (a "nightmare scenario" that would destroy the democratic movement in Iran and damage Western interests); the two main weak points of the regime (information and the economy); whether the Iranian Green Movement is dead (no); and what he has learned from "friends and more than a few strangers with connections inside the government" who have contacted him in London. They tell him his arrest was part of a plan hatched by the Revolutionary Guards a year before the election to eliminate reformists by connecting them with Western powers – Bahari being an agent connecting "the evil Western media and the reformists," according to this plan. His brutal interrogator Rosewater is a colonel in the revolutionary guards from a traditional religious Isfahani family whose organizational name is "Javadi".

== Reception ==
Jon Stewart of The Daily Show commented on the book, "Your ability to connect the story to your family, and the nuances you pick up, even from your captor, is incredible."

"Mr. Bahari's ordeal, which he has chronicled in his moving and, at times, very funny book Then They Came for Me, is more than just a random event in Iran's spiral from authoritarianism into totalitarianism. His arrest in June 2009 was one of the first organized government responses to a wave of grassroots protest movements that would soon sweep across most of the Middle East and North Africa. Because of Mr. Bahari's superb personal knowledge of Iran’s government, he was able to produce an account of exactly how, and why, he was tormented, and the larger context of a fast-changing regime. It offers a number of lessons about the way Middle Eastern politics work." – Doug Saunders, The Globe and Mail.

"Bahari's account of his 118-day incarceration, Then They Came For Me, turns a lens not only on Iran's surreal justice system but on the history and culture that helped produce it... Bahari's book is a damning account of a nation run by paranoid, sexually frustrated conspiracy theorists." – Tara Bahrampour, Washington Post.

"Then They Came for Me is a gripping story that weaves his family's history of incarceration by Iranian rulers with his own." – Leslie Scrivener, The Toronto Star.

"While Bahari's vivid descriptions make for a good read, perhaps the most compelling aspect of Then They Came for Me is Bahari's ability to capture the frustration that many Iranians, at home and abroad, feel toward Iran's current government. Then They Came for Me is not only a fascinating, human exploration into Bahari's personal experience but it also provides insight into the shared experience of those affected by repressive governments everywhere." – Hamed Aleaziz, Mother Jones.

"Then They Came for Me is engaging and informative – a gripping tribute to human dedication and a cogent indictment of a corrupt regime." – Andrew Imbrie Dayton, The Washington Independent Review of Books.

"This harrowing memoir provides an illuminating glimpse into the security apparatus of one of the world's most repressive countries. … Especially timely given recent events throughout the Middle East, this book is recommended for anyone wishing to better understand the workings of a police state." – Kirkus Reviews.

== Film ==
A film titled Rosewater was released in November 2014, based on the book. It was filmed in June and July 2013 and was directed and written by Jon Stewart, with Gael García Bernal starring as Bahari. J. J. Abrams provided some scripting assistance for Stewart.

== See also ==
- "First they came ...", the 1946 poem to which the title alludes
