= Radio Ranginkaman =

LGBTQ radio station

Coordinates: 47.1486°N 29.3017°E

UK, US, Canada, Australia, Turkey
- Frequency: 7610 kHz

Programming
- Language: Persian, Dari
- Network: Yahsat satellite

History
- First air date: October 2012

Links
- Webcast: radioranginkaman.org

Radio Ranginkaman (Persian: رادیو رنگین‌کمان, lit. 'Radio Rainbow') is an international LGBTQ radio station located in Transnistria but broadcasting in Persian and Dari languages. It is the only radio station for LGBT people in Iran, Afghanistan and Tajikistan.

Radio Ranginkaman started in October 2012 as a 30 minute radio show for Iran’s LGBT community, produced by professional volunteers and contributors. Originally broadcast on shortwave radio as well as online, it now goes out weekly on shortwave, satellite and via the Internet to the region.

The government of Iran has harsh attitude towards LGBT people and bans any kind of information related to sexual orientation. Radio Ranginkaman tries to provide millions of listeners with essential information including health related and legal advice.

== Notable people associated with Radio Ranginkaman ==
- Shaya Goldoust
- Freeman Kashani
- Maida Malik of the Canadian band, Heterochrome
- Zainab Prophet Zadeh
