= Anahita Akhavan =

Iranian Canadian painter

Anahita Akhavan is an Iranian-Canadian painter based in Toronto. Her practice is influenced by Islamic artistic ornamentation and cultural signifiers.

== Education ==
Akhavan received a Bachelor of Fine Arts from the University of Tehran in 2013 and a Master of Fine Arts from the University of Saskatchewan in 2016.

As a graduate student, Akhavan was awarded the Interdisciplinary Centre for Culture and Creativity Graduate Catalyst Award. Meant to support students' experiential learning alongside faculty members, the award allowed Akhavan to travel to Athens, Greece to assist Professor Allyson Glenn during her residency at the Vorres Museum.

== Career ==
She has exhibited extensively in Canada, Iran, and the United States with notable solo shows including Re-entrant at United Contemporary (2022) and Unsettled at North York Arts (2021). She has participated in artist residencies in Spain and Greece. She has also been included in numerous group exhibitions, including Art Parkdale International at Gallery 1313 (2020) and Resilience; Redefined at Artscape Youngplace (2020). Akhavan has taught drawing and painting at both the Toronto School of Art and University of Saskatchewan College of Art and Sciences.

Akhavan has secured funding from a number of government agencies including the Ontario Art Council (2022) and the Toronto Arts Council (2021). She also received the Royal Bank of Canada Newcomer Arts Award in 2021.

== Collections ==
Akhavan's work is held in the following corporate and private collections:

- Scotiabank
- TD Bank
- Telus
- Capital One
- RBC Permanent Art Collection
