= CSIEA-Ottawa =

CSIEA-Ottawa stands for the Canadian Society of Iranian Engineers and Architects-Ottawa (Persian: کانون کانادايی مهندسين وآرشيتكت هاى ايرانی - مركز اتاوا, French: Société canadienne des ingénieurs et des architectes iraniens - Ottawa). As a volunteer base organization, CSIEA has been founded by a group of interested individuals in 2004 in Ottawa, Ontario, Canada. The Society has a non-religious, non-political agenda, and is registered in Ontario.

So far CSIEA has had four annual general meetings (October 2004, May 2005, May 2006, and May 2007). CSIEA's website is .

Since its early days, CSIEA-Ottawa has maintained close relationship with Mohandes which is a similar organizations, with similar agenda, serving Toronto, Ontario, Canada.

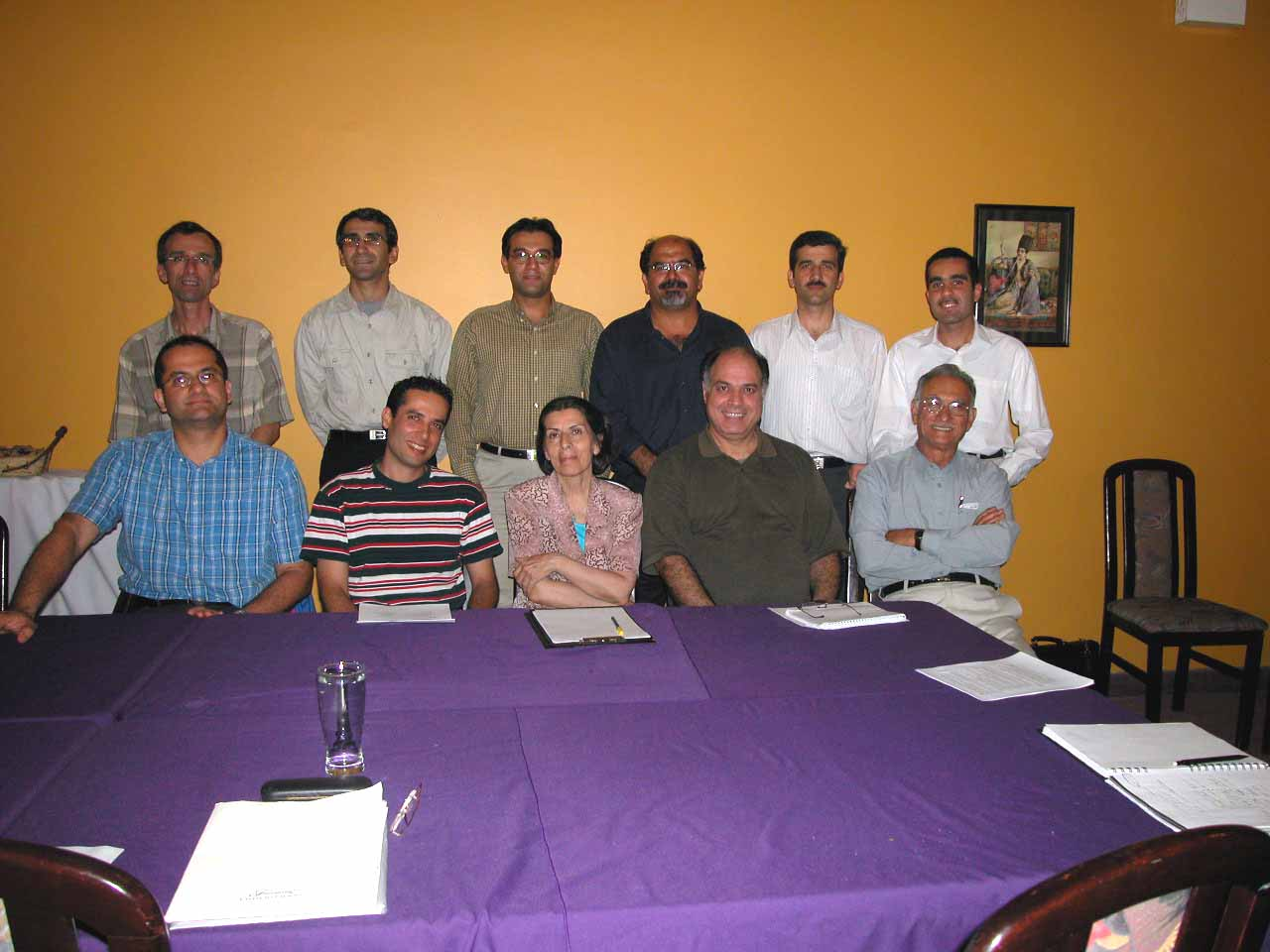
One of the first meetings with Mr. Khodabandeh (from Mohandes, Toronto), July 13, 2004, in Ottawa

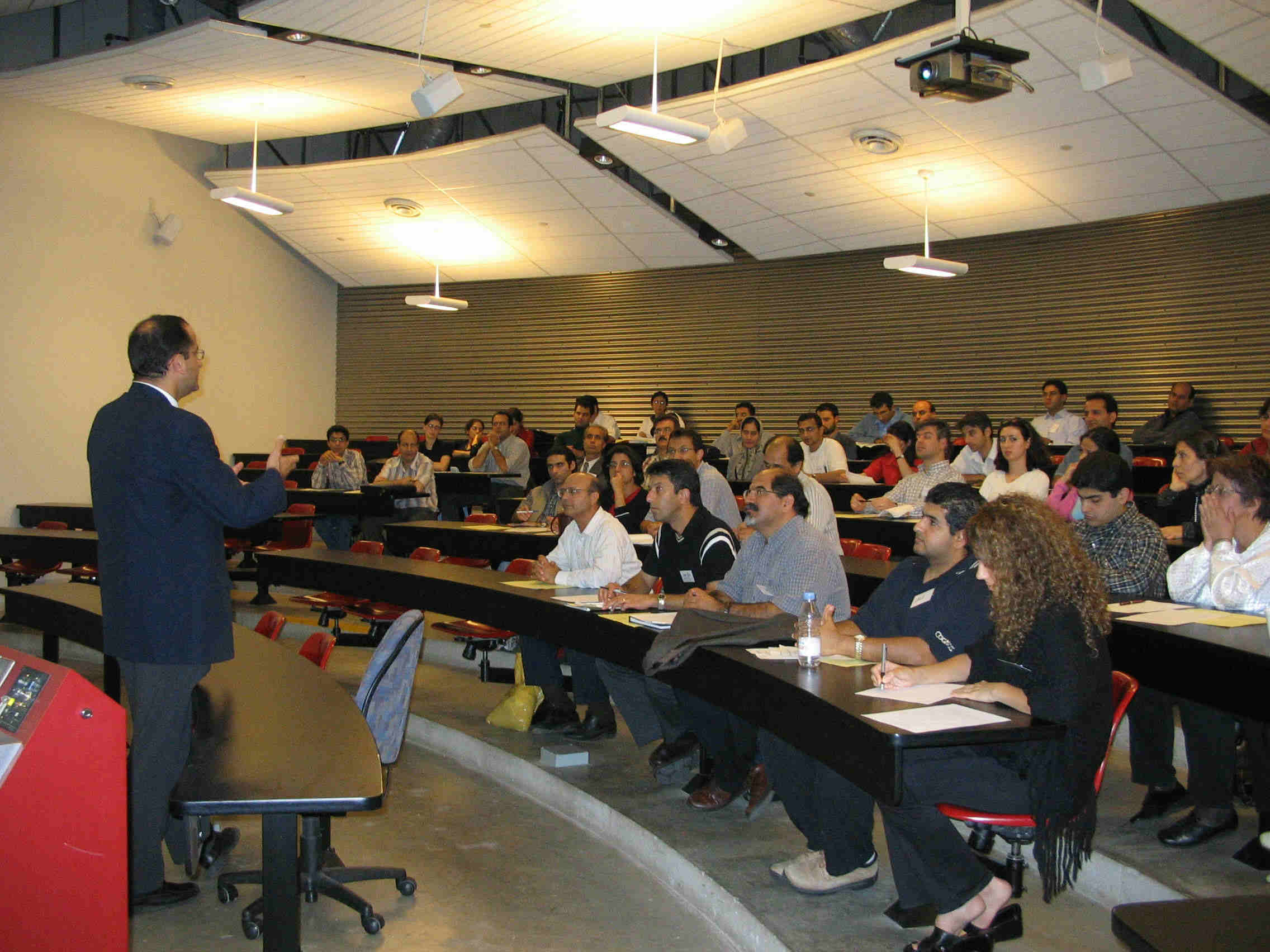
First Annual General Meeting, October 8, 2004

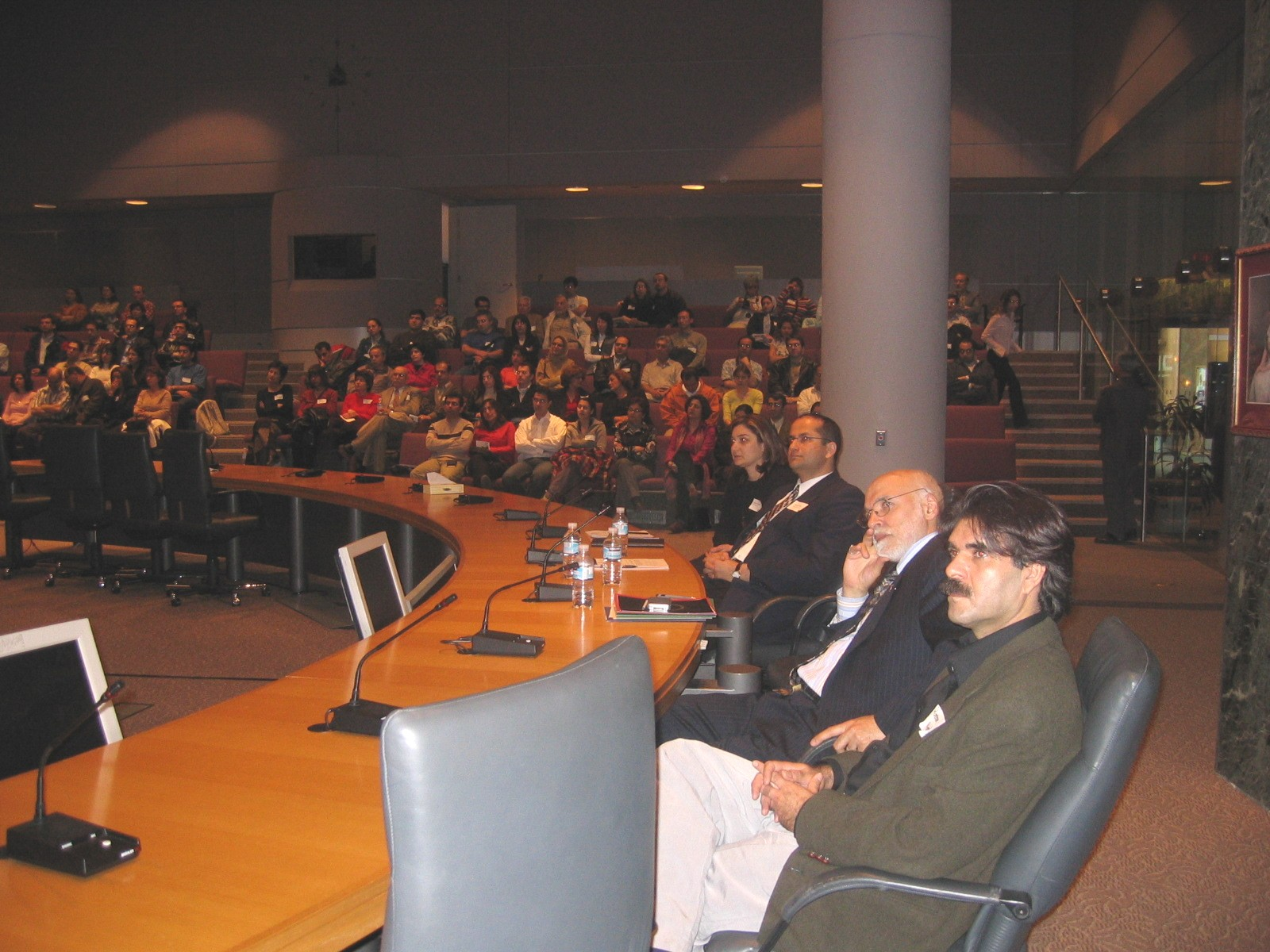
Seminar on 9/11 terrorist attacks & Bam reconstruction, on April 9, 2005

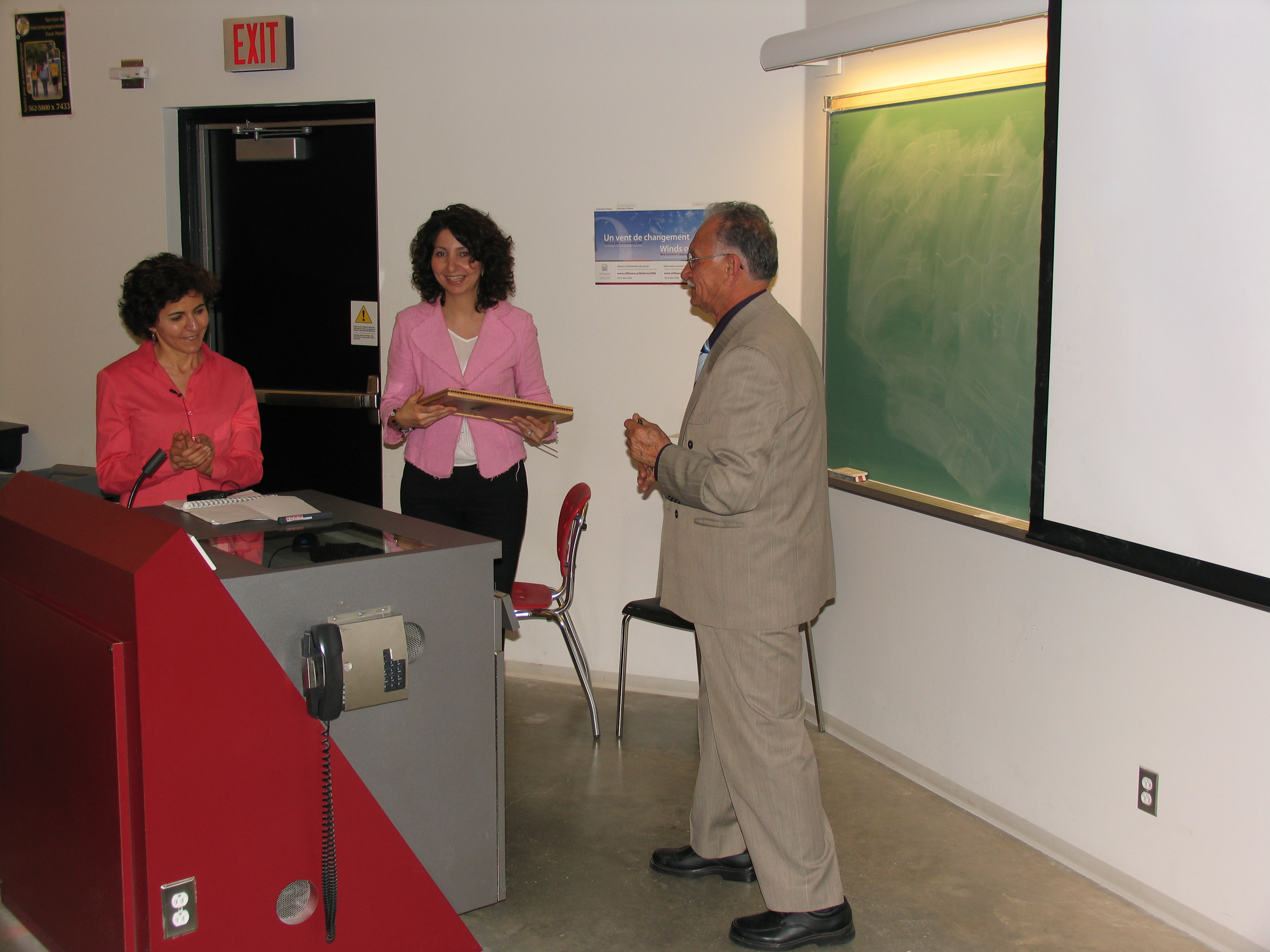
Cancer Awareness Session, on April 20, 2006

CSIEA organizes different events to facilitate its members' networking, and to promote knowledge, technology and science. It has also been involved in some community work, such as holding information session on cancer awareness for Persian speaking community in Ottawa, in collaboration with the Canadian Cancer Society.

== The pre-CSIEA era ==
The need for a professional association for Iranian engineers and architects was felt over the years, as many engineers and architects with Iranian background or ties with Iranian culture chose Ottawa as their permanent residence. This movement started in the 1980s and was intensified in the 1990s as Ottawa blossomed with private companies, universities and government institutions.

Before the inception of the CSIEA, Iranian engineers and architects met in different ways, mostly during private parties. Other events were organized by different groups, such as a slideshow on Bam and Kerman's architectural oeuvres in July 2002 and a group visit of the Canadian Museum of Science and Technology in November 2003.

A common characteristic of these pre-CSIEA events was that they were organized and managed by a relatively small number of people (in some instances only one person) and as a result, they lacked the generality in purpose and the continuity that a real association should demonstrate. Another weakness was the relatively small target audience of these events, which were mostly limited to friends and acquaintances.

== Few Milestones ==
So far, CSIEA has organized several seasonal events; annual general meetings; workshops; talks; and a number of outdoor events, helping many people to extend their networks of friends and colleagues.

Below is a table of CSIEA's major events:

| Event | Guest speaker(s) | Date | Attendance |
|---|---|---|---|
| Introduction to the IEEE; Better constructions against earthquake World without engineers! | Mr. Amir Ghavam, University of Ottawa; Mr. Behnam Shadravan , University of Ottawa; Dr. Bahram Zahir, University of Ottawa | November 20, 2004 | 80 |
| Two presentations on artificial organs | Dr. Toffy Mussivand, Ottawa Heart Institute | February 12, 2005 | 120 |
| Civil engineering aspects of the 9/11 terrorist attacks Bam reconstruction | Dr. Abolhassan Astaneh , University of California, Berkeley | April 19, 2005 | 140 |
| Workshop and a slideshow on Iranian architecture (Minaret) | Mrs. Alma Rahmani; Mrs. Houri Mashayekh | September 21, 2005 | 25 |
| Lecture on the subject Beyond Biology | Dr. Parham Aarabi, University of Toronto | January 28, 2006 | 50 |
| The Architectural Characteristics of North Dome in Isfahan's Jami Mosque; From Hormuz to Venice & Vice Versa | Mrs. Neda Ghannad, Carleton University; Dr. Frascari, Carleton University | March 18, 2006 | 150 |
| Exercise for Cancer Prevention | Dr. Neda Amani-Golshani | April 20, 2006 | 50 |
| Mining, Challenges and Sustainability | Dr. Faramarz Hasani , McGill University | September 16, 2006 | 40 |

== See also ==
- Iranian Canadians
