= ElectroBOOM =

Iranian-Canadian YouTuber and electrical engineer

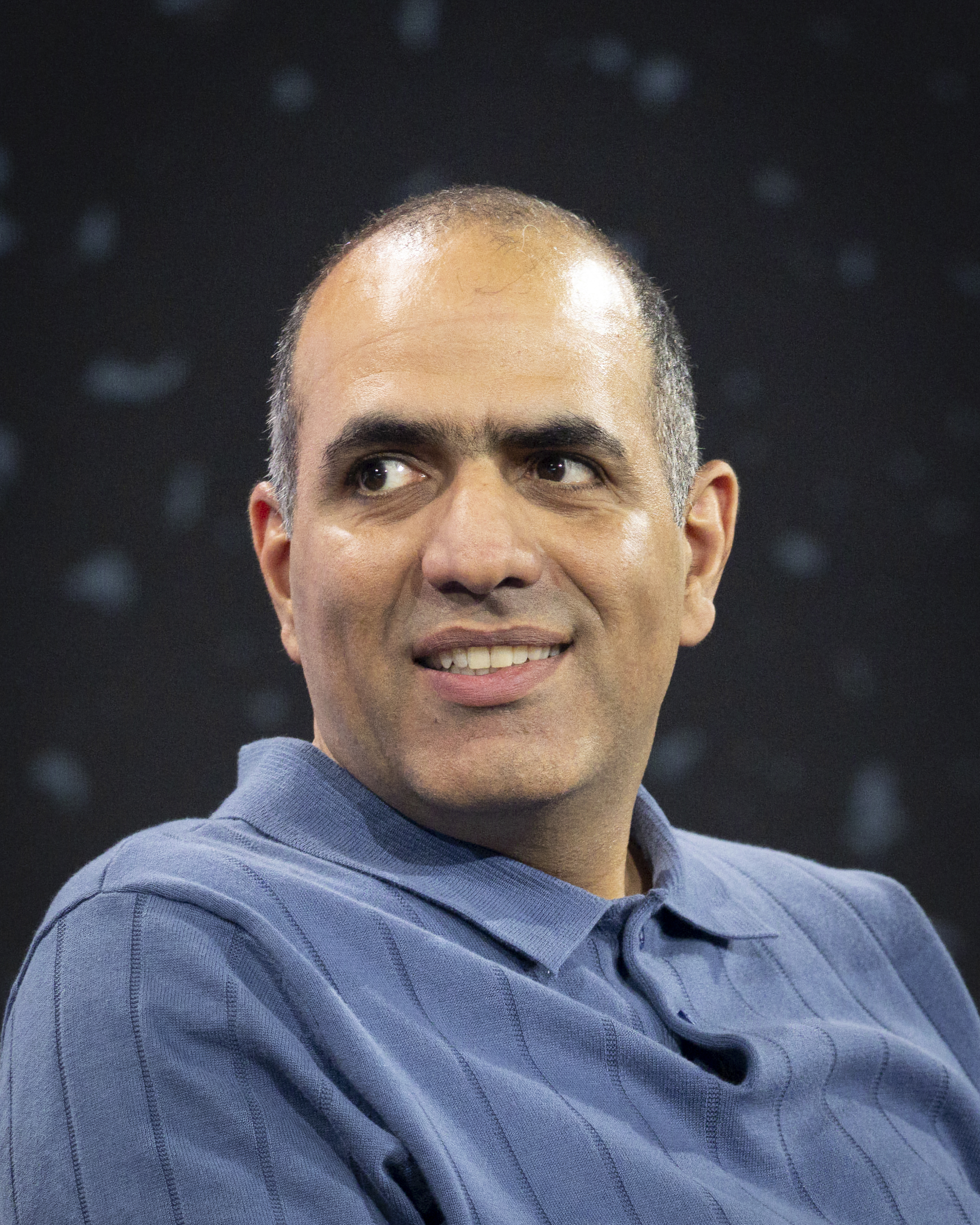
- Sadaghdar in 2026
- Born: Mehdi Sadaghdar; 13 January 1977 (age 49); Iran
- Education: University of Tehran (BASc); Simon Fraser University (MASc)
- Occupations: YouTuber; Electrical engineer
- Spouse: Safiya Nafisi (m. 1999)
- Children: 1

YouTube information
- Channel: ElectroBOOM
- Years active: 2007–present
- Genres: Electronics; Science; Comedy; Tutorials; DIY; Vlogging
- Subscribers: 8.83 million
- Views: 1.4 billion
- Last updated: 23 September 2026
- Website: electroboom.com

Mehdi Sadaghdar (Note: /ˈmɛdiː səˈdæɡˌdɑːr/ MEH-dee sə-DAG-dar; Persian: مهدی صدقدار, romanized: Mehdī Ṣadaqdār, IPA: [meɦd̪iː sæd̪æʁd̪ɒːɾ]) (born 13 January 1977), also known as ElectroBOOM, is an Iranian-Canadian electrical engineer and YouTube personality known for making educational comedy videos centered around electricity.

== Early life ==
Sadaghdar was born in Iran on 13 January 1977 and lives in Vancouver, British Columbia, Canada. He was conferred a Bachelor of Applied Science in Electronics/Telecommunications from the University of Tehran in 1999 and, after moving to Vancouver, a Master of Applied Science (Micro-Electronics) from Simon Fraser University in 2006. He married his wife, Safiya Nafisi, on 16 September 1999. They have a daughter together, Yona Sadaghdar, who is featured in some of his videos as a pianist or assistant, whom he refers to as ElectroCUTE.

== Career ==
Sadaghdar uploaded his first video in April 2012. His videos are mainly focused around comedic electronics tutorials and education. He often intentionally creates situations where a shock, fire or explosion (often caused by overloading electrolytic capacitors or using multimeters incorrectly) occurs for comedic effect, demonstrating the dangers of electricity when not properly handled. His most viewed video, "How NOT to Make an Electric Guitar (The Hazards of Electricity)", has over 22 million views and demonstrates the hazards of mains electricity.
