= Maziar Bahari =

Iranian journalist and filmmaker

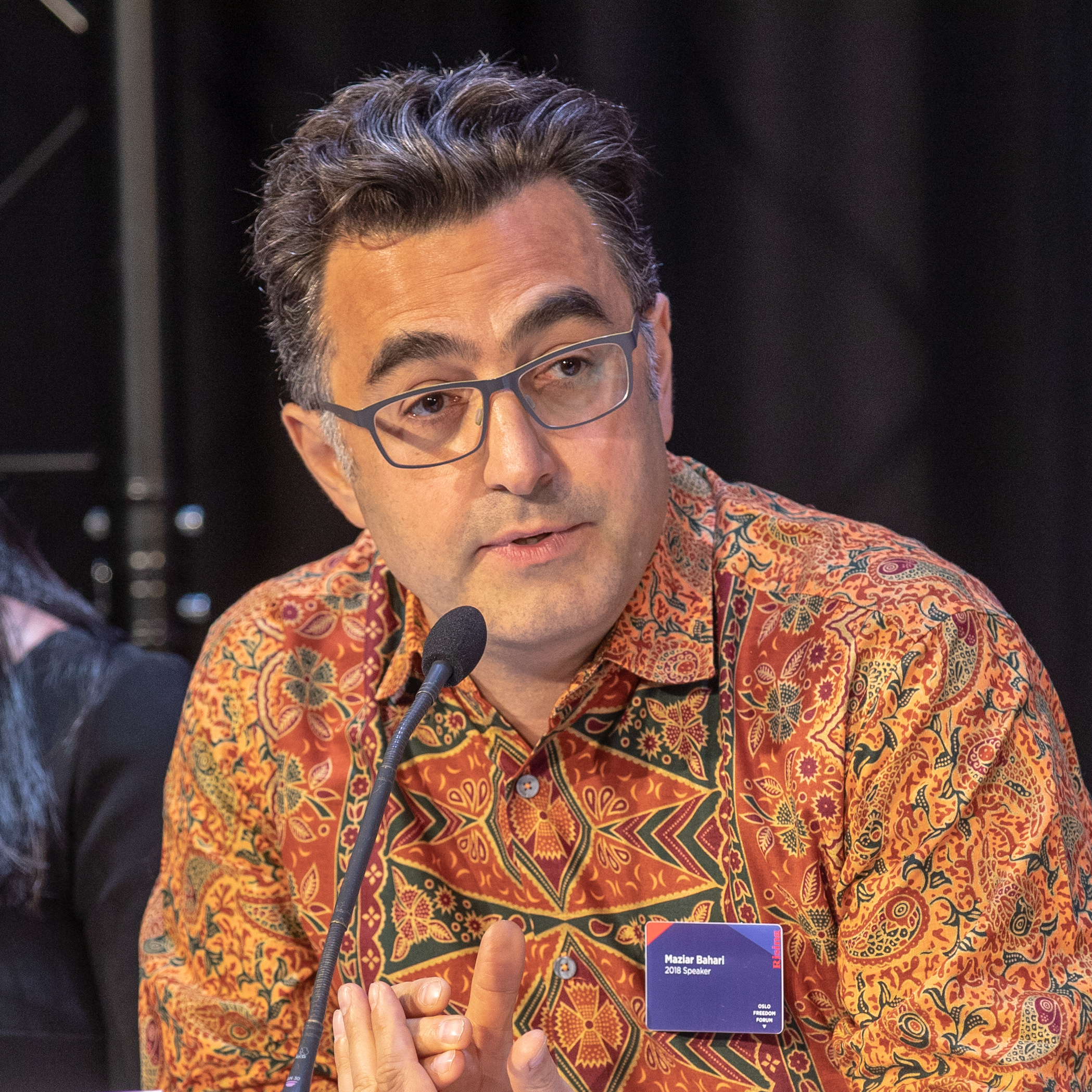
- Born: May 25, 1967 (age 59); Tehran, Imperial State of Iran
- Citizenship: Iranian; Canadian
- Education: Concordia University
- Occupations: Filmmaker, journalist
- Spouse: Paola Gourley
- Children: 1
- Website: www.maziarbahari.com

Maziar Bahari (Persian: مازیار بهاری; born May 25, 1967) is an Iranian-Canadian journalist, filmmaker and human rights activist. He was a reporter for Newsweek from 1998 to 2011. Bahari was incarcerated by the Iranian government from June 21, 2009 to October 17, 2009, and has written a family memoir, Then They Came for Me, a New York Times best seller. His memoir is the basis for Jon Stewart's 2014 film Rosewater. Bahari later founded the IranWire citizen journalism news site, the freedom of expression campaign Journalism Is Not A Crime and the education and public art organization Paint the Change.

== Family and education ==
Bahari was born in Tehran, Imperial State of Iran, but moved to Pakistan in 1987 before he immigrated to Canada in 1988 to study communications. His family has been involved in dissident politics in Iran: his father was imprisoned by the Shah's regime in the 1950s, and his sister Maryam under the revolutionary government of Ayatollah Khomeini in the 1980s. He is married to Paola Gourley, an Italian-English lawyer working in London, who gave birth to their first child in October 2009 shortly after his release from prison.

== Career ==
He graduated with a degree in communications from Concordia University in Montreal in 1993, before continuing some additional studies at the nearby McGill University. Soon after, Bahari made his first film, The Voyage of the Saint Louis, about the attempt by 937 German Jewish refugees to escape Nazi Germany on that ship in 1939, who were turned away by Cuba, the United States, and Canada, and ultimately forced to return to the Third Reich. In producing the film, Bahari became the first Muslim to make a film about the Holocaust. When asked what motivated him to make the film, he cited the courses he took at Concordia, where he:

studied the modern history of the Jews and I was fascinated by the history of the Jews in North America. I took a course on Freud and religion and the professor talked a lot about early 20th century anti-Semitism in the U.S. and Canada. I had no idea that even up until the 1950s Jews were discriminated against in North America, so I wanted to explore that further. As an immigrant, I was interested in the history of Jewish immigration from Europe to America. So I looked for a story to combine all these elements and came across the story of the St. Louis.

Later, while he was imprisoned in Iran the film "haunted" him, with his interrogators accusing him of being on a mission to work for Zionists.

In 1997 Bahari began reporting in Iran and making independent documentaries, and in 1998 he became Newsweek magazine's correspondent in Iran.

He has produced a number of other documentaries and news reports for Channel 4, BBC and other broadcasters around the world on subjects as varied as private lives of Ayatollahs, African architecture, Iranians' passion for football and contemporary history of Iran. In 2003, Harvard Film Archive praised Bahari's work:

"In a country known for neorealist fiction films that focus on small events in the lives of individuals, the work of Iranian director Maziar Bahari is somewhat anomalous. Employing a traditional documentary style to explore more far-reaching cultural events, Bahari's films provide a glimpse inside contemporary Iranian culture as they reveal the human element behind the headlines and capture cultural truths through the lens of individual experience. Representing a new generation of young Iranian filmmakers, Bahari's trenchant looks at social issues in his country have brought both controversy and international acclaim."

Bahari's films have won several awards and nominations including an Emmy in 2005. A retrospective of Bahari's films was organized in November 2007 by the International Documentary Film Festival Amsterdam. In September 2009, Bahari was nominated by Desmond Tutu for the Prince of Asturias Award for Concord, widely known as Spain's Nobel Prize. In 2020, US Holocaust Memorial Museum conferred its highest honor Elie Wiesel Award on Bahari for his exceptional courage in bringing the truth of the Holocaust to Iran and throughout the Middle East. The Museum praised Bahari for being a powerful voice against antisemitism.

== Arrest, imprisonment, release ==
On the morning of June 21, 2009, during the 2009 Iranian presidential election protests, Bahari was arrested at his family's home in Tehran and taken to Evin Prison. In July, while incarcerated, he appeared in a televised confession (broadcast internationally by PressTV) telling his interviewer that Western journalists worked as spies; that he had covered "illegal demonstrations" and "illegal gatherings", and was helping promote a "colour revolution".

His confession was dismissed by his family, his colleagues, and Reporters Without Borders, saying that it must have come under duress. Outside Iran, an international campaign to free him was headed by his wife and included petitions launched by Committee to Protect Journalists, Index on Censorship, International PEN, and groups of documentary filmmakers. Newsweek ran full-page advertisements in several major newspapers calling for his release. US Secretary of State Hillary Clinton spoke publicly of his case.

On October 17, after 118 days in jail and charged with 11 counts of espionage, Bahari was released on $300,000 bail. Bahari says he was asked to promise to spy on dozens of "anti-revolutionary elements" inside and outside Iran for the Revolutionary Guard and report to them weekly (a promise that he had no intention of keeping). He was allowed to leave the country and return to London days before the birth of his daughter.

== Post-imprisonment ==
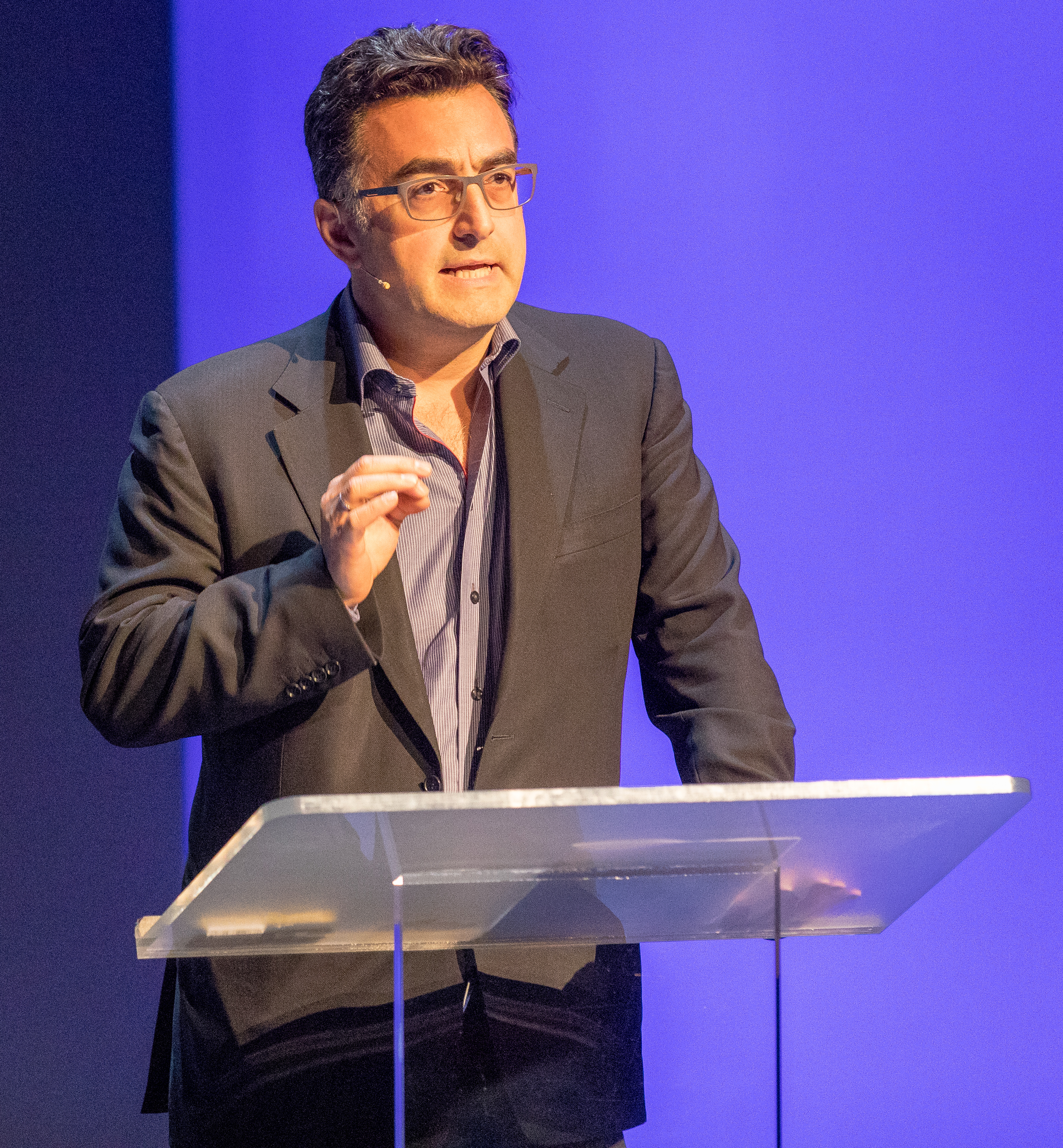
Bahari at Oslo Freedom Forum in 2018

After his release, Bahari recounted his time in prison in interviews and writings. He appeared on a segment of the television news program 60 Minutes and was the subject of an article in Newsweek. Bahari stated he confessed on television after physical and psychological torture. He was held in solitary confinement, interrogated daily (either blindfolded or made to face away from his interrogator), threatened with execution, and repeatedly slapped, kicked, punched, and hit with a belt by his interrogator. Bahari's interrogator told him they knew he (Bahari) "was working for four different intelligence agencies: the CIA, Mossad, MI6 and Newsweek." Bahari believes it was desperation to find "any evidence to prove I was a spy" that led his captors to believe his providing an American TV personality with a list of Iranians they could talk to in Iran, was evidence of his being a spy. (Bahari provided such a list shortly before he was interviewed by Jason Jones a "correspondent" of The Daily Show, who dressed up as a spy as a joke for the story.) He believes he was targeted to intimidate other international Iranian-born journalists, who can operate free of regime minders, blend in with crowds, and understand the cultural and linguistic nuances of the moves the regime makes (unlike foreign journalists).

In interviews Bahari stated that his interrogator told him not to talk about what happened to him in prison, as the Revolutionary Guards have "people all around the world and they can always bring me back to Iran in a bag". Bahari has stated that he will not be able to safely return to Iran until the Islamic Republic falls. In Iran he was tried in absentia by a revolutionary court, and sentenced to thirteen and a half years' imprisonment plus 74 lashes.

=== Campaign for other jailed journalists in Iran ===
Upon his release, Bahari launched a campaign in support of other jailed journalists in Iran. The name of the campaign, In an International Herald Tribune op-ed to launch the campaign Bahari wrote to Iran's Supreme Leader, Ayatollah Ali Khamenei,

"You may feel safe in your modest house, protected by thousands of revolutionary guards. But beyond them the world is changing. Iran is changing. In 1978, as the shah was doing his best to stifle his people, Ayatollah Khomeini promised that 'in an Islamic Iran the media will have the freedom to express all Iran's realities and events.' Hoping they could realize that promise, Iranians rose up and overthrew the shah. Ayatollah Khamenei, those who forget the lessons of history are doomed to repeat it."

=== IranWire ===
In 2013, Bahari launched IranWire, a "collaborative news website run by professional Iranian journalists in the diaspora and citizen journalists inside Iran," founded "in response to ongoing and brutal assaults on freedom of expression inside the Islamic Republic of Iran." Although the website is bilingual, only a fraction of the Persian articles are in English. IranWire works with a number of prominent Iranian journalists including Shima Shahrabi, Aida Ghajar, Shaya Goldoust, Ehsan Mehrabi and Masih Alinejad. The outlet formerly had a partnership with The Daily Beast, which ran from 2014 until 2020. IranWire's initial website was designed and developed by the Small Media Foundation, an organization founded in 2011 by Mahmood Enayat, General Manager of Iran International, which "works to support the free flow of information in politically closed societies," per its website. Small Media previously received over $2 million in grant funding from USAID.

IranWire is owned by Off-Centre Productions, a UK-based media and film production company founded in 2010 and owned by Bahari through parent company Gelsomina Holdings. Off-Centre has an affiliate relationship with the nonprofit Journalism for Change, founded by Bahari in 2014. Journalism for Change has historically paid Off-Centre over $1 million annually "for consulting and other expenses on grants and projects," with these payments reported as related party transactions in Journalism for Change's audited financials.

As of 2024, IranWire was largely funded through grants from the U.S. State Department, via Journalism for Change. Government grants made up about 98% of Journalism for Change's revenue in 2023, and about 94% in 2024, with nearly all of it from the U.S. State Department, either directly or through intermediary organizations such as the National Endowment for Democracy, Iran Human Rights, and the Small Media Foundation, among others.

IranWire is cited several times in the U.S. State Department, Office of International Religious Freedom's 2023 Report on International Religious Freedom for Iran. Its articles are also routinely cited by the Foundation for Defense of Democracies, a neoconservative, pro-Israel think tank supportive of regime change in Iran.

=== Press TV vs Maziar Bahari ===
After his release, Bahari launched a complaint against the Iranian government's English satellite channel, Press TV, for filming and airing an interview with him under duress. In May 2011, Ofcom upheld Bahari's three complaints against Press TV. In the summary, Ofcom said Press TV's presentation of Bahari was unfair because it "omitted material facts and was placed in a context in which inferences adverse to Mr Bahari could be drawn". The media regulator also said that Press TV failed to get his consent and this "contributed to the overall unfairness to Mr Bahari in the item broadcast". Ofcom added that filming and broadcasting the interview without consent "while he was in a sensitive situation and vulnerable state was an unwarranted infringement of Mr Bahari's privacy".

Upon the release of Ofcom's findings, Press TV launched a campaign against Bahari and Ofcom. Bahari was accused of being "an MI6 contact person". Press TV's failure to pay a £100,000 fine for showing Bahari's 'confession' was connected with the revocation of Press TV's licence to broadcast in the UK, via satellite, in January 2012.

== Awards and honors ==
- Oxfam Novib/PEN Award, nominated for an Emmy for his film

== Filmography ==
- Paint! No Matter What, 1999 (about artist Khosrow Hassanzadeh)
- Of Shames and Coffins (about Aids in South Africa)
- Mohammad and the Matchmaker (about an HIV+ man's search for love in Iran)
- Football, Iranian Style (about Iranian passion for soccer)
- And Along Came a Spider (about a serial killer in Iran)
- Targets: Reporters in Iraq (about post-traumatic stress disorder among journalists working in Iraq)
- Greetings from Sadr City (about life in the Baghdad suburb during the war)
- A Cult that would be an Army - Cult of the Chameleon (about the Mujaheddin Khalgh of Iran)
- The Fall of a Shah (about the history of the Iranian Revolution)
- An Iranian Odyssey (about the CIA-backed 1953 coup in Iran)
- Forced Confessions, 2012
- Rosewater, 2014 (about Bahari's 118 days of detention and torture in Iran's Evin Prison, screenwritten and directed by Jon Stewart, in which Bahari is portrayed by Gael García Bernal)
- To Light a Candle (about the persecution of Baháʼís in Iran and the Baháʼí Institute for Higher Education)
- The Cost of Discrimination, 2017
- 82 Names, 2012

== Then They Came for Me ==
Bahari wrote a prison memoir and family history, Then They Came for Me. The book became a New York Times Best Seller and has been called "incredible" by Jon Stewart of The Daily Show who worked with Bahari on his film based on the book. Doug Saunders of The Globe and Mail called the book "Moving and, at times, very funny", and said that it "offers a number of lessons about the way Middle Eastern politics work." Leslie Scrivener of The Toronto Star explained "Then They Came for Me is a gripping story that weaves his family's history of incarceration by Iranian rulers with his own." Mother Jones magazine wrote that "Then They Came for Me is not only a fascinating, human exploration into Bahari's personal experience but it also provides insight into the shared experience of those affected by repressive governments everywhere." Kirkus Reviews praised the book for "Providing an illuminating glimpse into the security apparatus of one of the world's most repressive countries. Especially timely given recent events throughout the Middle East, this book is recommended for anyone wishing to better understand the workings of a police state."

== See also ==
- List of foreign nationals detained in Iran
