= 20:30 =

20:30 is an evening prominent news program in Iranian IRIB TV2 that airs every night at 8:30 pm. The show is mostly notable because it has featured forced confessions they have conducted. The news main reporters over the years include Yazerlu,Mousavi, Amene Sadat Zabihi, Mohamed Delavari, Ali Rezvani, Yusuf Salami and Kamran Najafzade, some of whom are sanctioned by United States for Iranian regime breaching human rights. The program has been criticized by IRIB CEO for manipulating news.
