= Mohammad Saleh Meftah =

Iranian jurist, political activist, and journalist

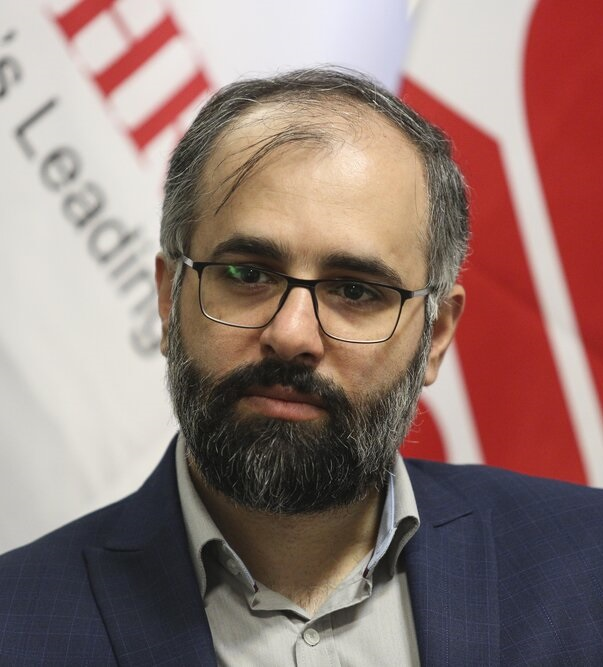

Chairman of the Political Committee Progress and Justice Population of Islamic Iran
- In office Right now

Expert Majlis Research Center
- In office 2021–2021

Deputy of Media, Culture and Education Iran's headquarters for enjoining the good and forbidding the evil
- In office 2019–2021

Member of the Central Council and Spokesperson Iranian Student Justice Movement
- In office 2008–2009

Personal details
- Born: 5 July 1985 (age 41) Estahban، Fars province
- Party: Iranian Student Justice Movement
- Spouse: Married
- Education: Imam Sadiq University
- Occupation: Jurist, Activism and journalist
- Profession: Public law، Islamic teachings
- Website: Official website

Mohammad Saleh Meftah (Persian: محمدصالح مفتاح; born 5 July 1985 in Estahban) is an Iranian jurist, political activist and journalist. He is the head of the Young Journalists Club. He was Secretary of the election headquarters of the Islamic Republic of Iran Broadcasting in Iran presidenal election in 2024.

He was a member of the Central Council and chairman of Progress and Justice Population of Islamic Iran. He is known as an activist of the Persian-language Twitter community and as someone who makes demands of the authorities. He was born in Estahban, Fars province, and lives in Tehran. He is known as a Principlist political figure and media activist, and he is a member of the Central Council of the Muslim Bloggers Association.

Three days after the appointment of Alireza Zakani as the mayor of Tehran, he complained about Zakani's illegal appointment and demanded the annulment of Zakani's verdict by the Minister of Interior.

== Life and education ==
He holds a Master of Laws in Public law and a Master of Islamic Studies from Imam Sadegh University.

== Activities ==
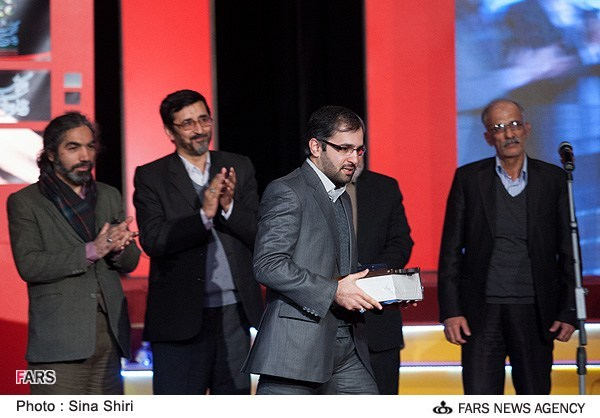
Awarding the second film award of Islamic Revolution Discourse

He started blogging in 2003 and from then on, he began making demands of officials. He established various blogs and received awards from people such as Mohammad-Reza Mahdavi Kani.

With the decline of the blogging era, he began contributing on social media and news agencies. He has received awards for establishing and managing news agencies. Because of his criticism, his website was filtered once for two months, and the IRGC complained about him.

He complained about Alireza Zakani's illegal appointment three days after Zakani was appointed mayor of Tehran, and called for the Interior Minister to annul Zakani's decree.

== Production ==
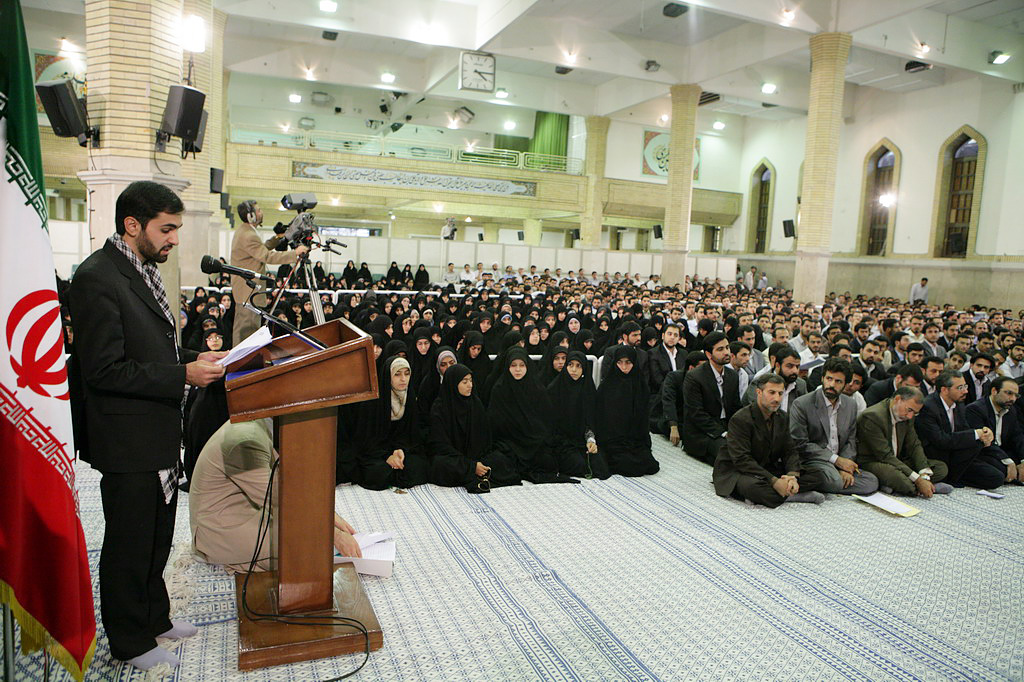
Lecture by Mohammad Saleh Meftah in the presence of Sayyed Ali Khamenei

=== Television ===
Year	Title	Role	Channel
2007	فانوس راه	Presenter	Jame Jam TV
2013	فانوس	Presenter	IRIB TV2
2020	جمهوریت	Presenter	IRIB Ofogh

=== Radio ===
Year	Title	Role	Channel
2018	بدون خط خوردگی	Expert provider	رادیو گفت‌وگو
2018	گفت‌وگوی اجتماعی	Expert provider	رادیو گفت‌وگو
2018–19	سیاست نامه	Expert provider	رادیو گفت‌وگو
2019	گفت‌وگوی سیاسی	Expert provider	رادیو گفت‌وگو
2019	گفت‌وگوی اجتماعی	Expert provider	رادیو گفت‌وگو
2019	فردای روشن	Expert provider	رادیو گفت‌وگو
2019	ارغنون	Expert provider	رادیو گفت‌وگو
2019	انعکاس	Expert provider	رادیو گفت‌وگو
2019	بحث روز	Expert provider	رادیو ایران
2021	منحصر به فرد	Producer and presenter	رادیو جوان

=== Documentary film ===
Year	Title	Role	Channel
2013	بی‌قرارگاه مهرآباد	Producer	Screening in cinemas
	روزنامه‌نگار تراز انقلاب اسلامی	Producer	IRIB Mostanad
	سریال داستانی اینترنتی سلام آقای رئیس جمهور	Producer	
