= Ghazal Omid =

Iranian-Canadian author

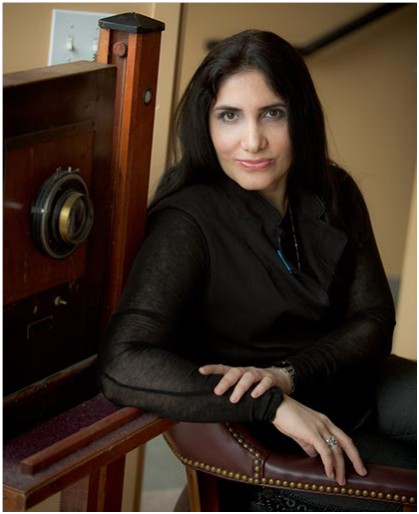
- Omid in 2011
- Born: Abadan, Iran
- Citizenship: Canada
- Occupations: Author, legal scholar
- Writing career
- Genre: Autobiography
- Notable work: Living in Hell

Ghazal Omid (Persian غزل امید) is an Iranian-Canadian author. She wrote an autobiographical work entitled Living in Hell: A True Odyssey of a Woman's Struggle in Islamic Iran Against Personal and Political Forces. She is known in the United States as an advocate for human rights and women's rights and is also a Shi'a legal scholar.

== Personal life ==
Omid was born in Abadan, Iran. Her father was a multi-millionaire who abandoned the family and sought refuge in the United States when she was a child. She grew up in Isfahan and was 8 years old when the Shah of Iran was overthrown by the Ayatollah Khomeini. Omid is a practicing Muslim and has made the religious pilgrimage to Mecca. In 1995, she fled Iran and moved to Canada. In 2008, she moved to Washington DC.

== Activism ==
Omid's autobiography, Living in Hell, is critical of Iran and the human rights abuses occurring there. Because of this, her book's website has been the focus of online abuse and threats from computer users in Iran, Turkey and Pakistan. Omid has criticized Iran for using books to teach martyrdom to children. She also wants Iranian books to stop referring to the United States as the "Great Satan". Omid is concerned that these books may be turning children into "ticking bombs".

Currently, Omid is the Executive Director for Iran & Its Future.org, a US-based 501(c)(3) nonprofit organization focused on advocating for the improvement of life in Iran. In 2014 she worked to bring children burned in a school fire in Iran to the US for medical treatment.

== Publications ==
- Living in Hell: A True Odyssey of a Woman's Struggle in Islamic Iran Against Personal and Political Forces (2005) Park Avenue Publishers ISBN 978-0-9759683-0-7 OCLC 60764503
- Omid, Ghazal (2012). Mr. Nightingale: A story adapted from the life of an Iranian child. ISBN 9781479313075. OCLC 876333397.
- Omid, Ghazal (2015). Maryam and Mr. Rabbi, Part I: Based on a true story about a Muslim and a Jewish family from Iran. ISBN 978-1519340245.
- Omid, Ghazal (2015). Maryam and Mr. Rabbi, Part II: Based on a true story about a Muslim and a Jewish family from Iran. ISBN 978-1519498250.
