= Hakim Optical =

Canadian optician and eyewear retail chain

Hakim Optical Lab Ltd.
- Industry: Retail Optical and Manufacturing
- Founded: 1967; 59 years ago Toronto, Ontario
- Founder: Karim Hakimi
- Headquarters: Toronto, Ontario, Canada
- Number of locations: 161
- Area served: Ontario; Nova Scotia; New Brunswick; Manitoba; Saskatchewan; Alberta; British Columbia
- Products: Prescription Eyeglasses; Prescription Lenses; Eyeglass Frames; Sunglasses; Safety Glasses; Contact Lenses
- Owner: Karim Hakimi
- Number of employees: 650
- Website: hakimoptical.ca

Hakim Optical Lab Ltd. is a Canadian optical chain, the largest privately owned optical chain in Canada. In 2016, it had about 160 stores.

== Founder ==
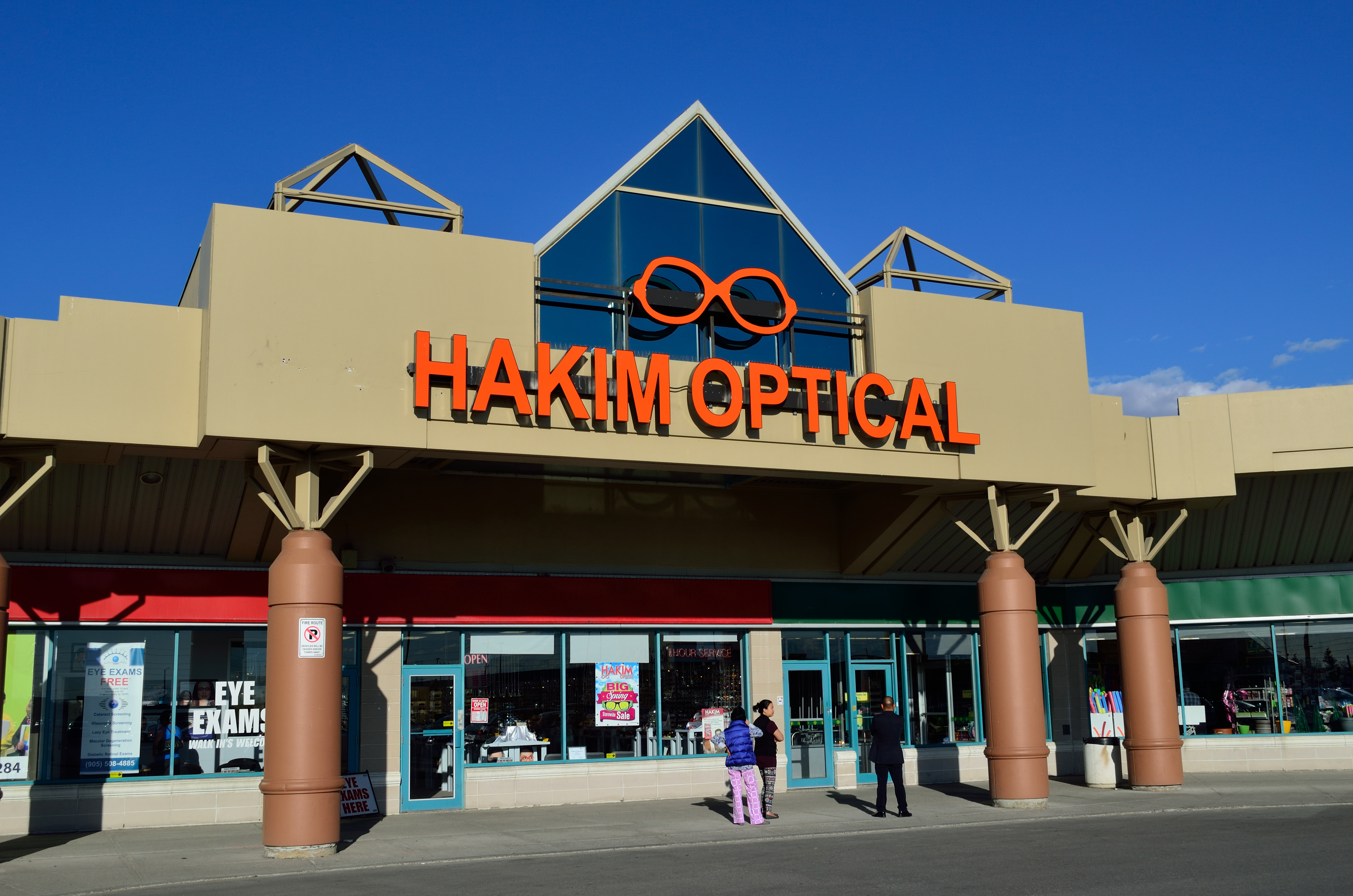
Hakim Optical in Richmond Hill

Karim Hakimi, a native of Iran, learned to make lenses from old window glass as a child. After a stint in the navy, Hakimi worked in the optical industry in Switzerland. He then migrated to Canada and opened an optical laboratory in the former Elmwood Hotel (now the Elmwood Spa) in downtown Toronto, Ontario. He bought and rebuilt old equipment from a closed-down lab in Chicago. After making a variety of lenses, he began selling them to local optometrists. He soon began selling lenses directly from the Elmwood location.

The company has sold over 40 million pairs of glasses. Karim Hakimi remains CEO, and runs the day-to-day operations at Hakim head office located at 128 Hazelton Avenue in Toronto.

On October 18, 2008, the City of Toronto government renamed Lebovic Avenue in the Scarborough district to Hakimi Avenue. The City of Toronto does not normally name streets after living persons but made an exception in recognition of Hakimi's contributions. A documentary about Hakim Optical and its founder, titled Hakim: A Vision of Success, was made for Omni Television with Persian subtitles.

== Early history ==
As the business grew, Hakim Optical opened a storefront near Highway 10 and Dundas Street in 1967. The next store was at Yonge Street and Finch Avenue, near the current Finch subway station.

By 1985, Hakim Optical operated 27 stores, with 25 in Ontario and two in Nova Scotia. Certain locations provided on-site, one-hour services. The chain had 200 employees, many of them newcomers to Canada.

Hakim Optical has promoted its optical chain with its trademark jingle "Your Eyes Can Have it All at Hakim Optical" since 2003, which has been named by Huffington Post Canada as one of Canada's most memorable jingles and is still used.

== Retail locations ==
On May 1, 2011, Hakim Optical opened its new flagship location at Yonge–Dundas Square (now Sankofa Square) in Toronto which is two blocks away from the original 1967 location.

In November 2017, Hakim Optical partnered with virtual reality and augmented reality agency VusionVR Inc. to expand the in-store service by offering an app that would take a customer's selfie and apply a Snapchat-like filter of the eyewear being considered for purchase.

As of June 2020, Hakim Optical had 161 retail locations (including 140 one-hour factory outlets) across Canada and also operates six lens factories.

In February 2023, the so-called flagship store was closed after non-payment of their lease. Additionally, their website shows a location at Lougheed Mall in Burnaby, but this site is permanently closed.

In August 2024, the Hakim Optical location at Stone Road Mall in Guelph, Ontario was served a lease termination due to non-payment of rent, after receiving notice 11 days prior. According to a paper document at the store's location, they've been given 8 days to vacate.

On January 10, 2024, the front door at the Silvercreek Parkway North location in Guelph, Ontario also featured a document with an order from the landlord to vacate within 5 days. The document stated that the location had failed to pay $62,711.88 of owed rent.
