= Forced confessions in Iran =

According to various human rights groups and observers, the Islamic Republic of Iran has systematically used forced confessions against political dissidents and other prisoners, where individuals are forced to confess to crimes they did not commit under torture or other duress. Such confessions are often prominently broadcast on national television.

== History and frequency ==
Forced confessions were first televised by Iran in the years following the 1979 Iranian Revolution, with regular targets including suspected communists and insurgents. In 2007, Human Rights Watch stated they had documented cases of torture to coerce confessions in Tehran's Evin Prison. In July 2009, Iran's Basij militia lieutenant commander stated that so many confessions were obtained following the 2009 Iranian presidential election protests crackdown that the media could not broadcast them all even over a long period. A 2014 United Nations Special Rapporteur on Human Rights report found that 70% of interviewed detainees in Iran claimed coerced information or confessions were used in their hearings.

In June 2020, the International Federation for Human Rights (FIDH) and its member organization Justice for Iran (JFI) released a report finding that between 2009 and 2019, Iranian state-owned media Islamic Republic of Iran Broadcasting (IRIB) broadcast the forced confessions of about 355 individuals and defamatory content against at least 505 individuals. The report was the outcome of more than 1,500 hours of research and analysis of over 150 programs and 13 in-depth interviews with victims of forced confessions. In the first month of the 2025–2026 Iranian protests, according to the Human Rights Activists in Iran advocacy group, at least 240 forced confessions were aired on television.

== Format ==
=== Content ===
According to historian Ervand Abrahamian in 1999, the public e'terafat in Iran are not simply confessions, but "political and ideological recantation(s)". They come in a variety of forms, "pretrial testimonials; in chest-beating letters; in mea culpa memoirs; press conferences, 'debates', and 'roundtable discussions'", but most commonly in videotaped 'interviews' and 'conversations' aired on prime-time television." The standard form in the time of Ayatollah Khomeini began with an introduction hailing Imam Khomeini with all of his titles (Founder of the Islamic Republic, leader of the Islamic Revolution, etc.) The recanter "emphasised the interview was entirely voluntary and that the speaker had come forth willingly to warn others of the pitfalls awaiting them if they deviated from the Khatt-e Imam [line of the Imam] Then followed condemnation of the prisoner's organisation, beliefs, comrades. Ended with thanks to the wardens [for the opportunity to] see the light. It hoped that the sincere repentance and the Imam's compassion would pave the way for forgiveness, redemption, ... [however, if] the Imam chose not to forgive, that too would be understandable in light of the enormity of the crimes."

Public forced confessions in the 21st century have often had defendants admit to an alleged manipulation by or cooperation with Western organizations to bring about a color revolution in Iran. Nancy Updike observed in 2009 that "people in Iran who have never met each other have nevertheless been confessing to a lot of the same things, in a lot of the same ways, for at least 10 years".

=== Techniques ===
Techniques used to extract confessions have included whipping, most often on the soles of the feet; deprivation of sleep; suspension from the ceiling and high walls; twisting of forearms until they broke; crushing of hands and fingers between metal presses; insertion of sharp instruments under the fingernails; cigarette burns; submersion under water; standing in one place for hours on end; mock executions; and physical threats against family members. While the constitution of the Islamic Republic explicitly outlaws shekanjeh (torture) and the use of coerced confessions, other laws are employed to allow coercion. Up to 74 lashings can be administered for 'lying to the authorities', and a defendant may be found guilty of lying by a cleric in the process of interrogating the defendant. Thus "clerical interrogators can give indefinite series of 74 lashings until they obtain 'honest answers'". From the moment they arrived in prison, through their interrogation prisoners were asked if they were willing to give an "interview". (mosahebah) "Some remained incarcerated even after serving their sentences simply because they declined the honour of being interviewed."

According to one defendant in a 1984 report, "his interrogator kept on repeating throughout his torment 'This hadd punishment will continue until you give us a videotaped interview'", "interview" being the term used for confession sessions. In 2019, Amnesty International reported that Iran had been keeping women arrested for campaigning against hijab mandate laws in incommunicado detention and prolonged solitary confinement to solicit confessions.

== Broadcasting ==
During the 1980s, television "recantation" shows were common on Iranian state television. Currently, national state media corporation IRIB is a prominent broadcaster of forced confessions, with many aired during the 20:30 evening news program. Some interrogators such as IRGC-affiliated Ali Rezvani and Ameneh-Sadat Zabihpour have appeared hundreds of times in IRIB broadcasts eliciting forced confessions. IRIB has denied an involvement in eliciting confessions, with its head Peyman Jebelli claiming in February 2026 that they simply broadcast what was supplied to them by authorities. Fars News Agency and Tasnim News Agency have also broadcast forced confessions.

The visual format of forced confessions has varied. Some subjects are shown being interrogated as they look directly at the camera, while confessions by more prominent figures such as journalists or politicians are often staged like informal interviews, with the subject and their interviewer seated across a table. Confessions broadcast after the 2025–2026 protests featured the subjects handcuffed and with their faces blurred, alongside footage of their alleged actions.

The practice of collecting confessions has been used to demoralize the Iranian opposition, gather information, and sow fear and distrust. According to Abrahamian, these recantations served as powerful propaganda not only for both the Iranian public at large but also for the recanter's former colleagues, for whom the denunciations were demoralising and confusing. They have been used on a much larger scale than in Stalin's Soviet Union because the confessions could be videotaped and broadcast for purposes of propaganda.

== Notable cases ==
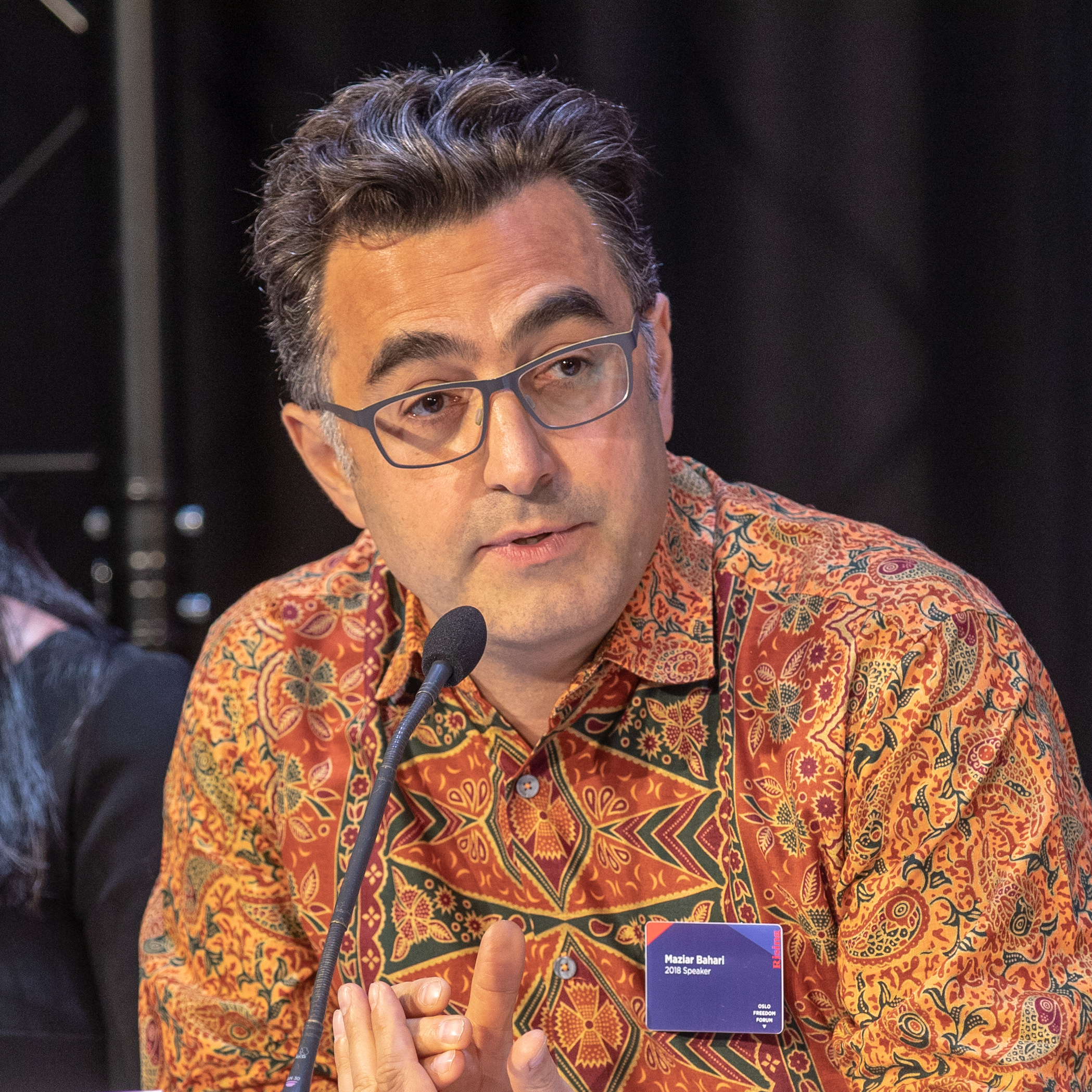
Maziar Bahari created a documentary about his forced confession experience.

An August 2009 mass show trial of people involved in the 2009 presidential election protests was described by historian Reza Afshari as including forced confessions, which aimed to place the blame on outside influences for initiating protesters' charges of electoral fraud.

The 2009 case of Newsweek correspondent Maziar Bahari resulted in significant international attention. Bahari went on to direct the 2012 documentary film Forced Confessions about his ordeal.

== Responses ==
In November 2022, the United States sanctioned IRIB "interrogator journalists" Rezvani and Zabihpour citing their involvement in forced confessions.

In January 2023, the European Parliament adopted a resolution condemning "the Islamic Republic's policy of forcing confessions using torture, intimidation, threats against family members or other forms of duress, and the use of these forced confessions to convict and sentence protesters."

== See also ==
- Human rights in the Islamic Republic of Iran
- Propaganda in Iran
