= Shaya Goldoust =

Iranian-born Canadian journalist, activist (born 1986)

- شایا گلدوست
- Born: April 1, 1986 (age 40); Rasht, Gilan province, Iran
- Occupations: Journalist, human rights activist, LGBTQ activist, radio presenter, radio producer

Shaya Goldoust (Persian: شایا گلدوست; born 1 April 1986) is an Iranian-born Canadian journalist, human rights activist, radio host, and radio producer. She is one of the presenters of Iran Wire, and Radio Ranginkaman. She lives in Vancouver in British Columbia, Canada.

== Biography ==
Shaya Goldoust was born on 1 April 1986, in Rasht, in the Gilan province, Iran. She is transgender. At the age of 18, she emigrated from Iran to Turkey, and then to Canada.

Goldoust openly speaks on women's rights, and LGBTQ issues in Iran. She has served as a speaker for the LGBTQIA in Iran (which are often refer to as the 'rainbow community') an Islamic state, which has included a collective letter sent to teachers in 2022. Goldoust attended the Vancouver Pride Parade and Pride Toronto in 2023 during the Woman, Life, Freedom movement, wearing a rainbow colored gown and carrying a sign of solidarity with oppressed minorities in Iran. She was part of the radio documentary series, "My Censored Life", which described her personal experiences growing up in Iran.

== See also ==
- Homosexuality and Islam
- LGBT history in Iran
- Transgender rights in Iran
