= Karim Hakimi =

Iranian Canadian entrepreneur and optician, founder of Hakim Optical

- Born: Iran
- Occupations: Entrepreneur; optician
- Known for: Founder of Hakim Optical

Karim Hakimi (Persian: کریم حکیمی) (born 1933) is an Iranian-Canadian entrepreneur and optician, known for founding Hakim Optical, a large chain of eyeglass stores across Canada.

== Early life ==
Hakimi was born in Iran. At the age of five, his father died, and Hakimi subsequently left school to work to support his family. He found work in Iran grinding discarded window glass into lenses for magnifying glasses and eyeglasses. This experience taught him much about the techniques and equipment needed by an optician.

At 14, Hakimi attended night school to complete his elementary education, learning to read and write. Later, following service in the Iranian navy, he immigrated first to Germany and then to Switzerland, where he furthered his education in the optician's craft.

== Career ==
Hakimi immigrated to Toronto, Ontario, where he found work in the field of ophthalmic lens grinding. He saved his money until he could start his own shop.

In 1967, Hakimi opened his own lens-grinding laboratory in the former Elwood Hotel in Toronto, buying and rebuilding equipment from a shuttered facility in Chicago. Initially, he sold his lenses door-to-door, directly to optician shops. Soon he was able to save enough money to open his first retail shop, selling glasses by day and working nights to fulfil orders.

At first, Hakimi offered glasses for CA$8/pair ($12 for bifocals), which far undersold any competitors. He was able to raise his prices 50 percent from this starting point while still underselling his competitors and assuring continued demand for his glasses.

From this beginning as a single retail outlet, Hakimi has built Hakim Optical into a national chain of over 150 outlets with over 600 employees serving the eastern provinces of Canada.

== Awards and recognition ==
Hakimi has received several awards and other recognitions. In 2005, he was knighted by the Sovereign Military Order of Malta. In 2008, the City of Toronto renamed Scarborough Street Hakimi Avenue in his honour.

In 2011, he was named one of the Canadian Immigrant magazine's Top 25 Canadian Immigrants. The next year, he received the Queen Elizabeth II Diamond Jubilee Medal. In 2014, a portion of Lebovic Avenue was renamed Hakimi Avenue. The Hakimi Lebovic stop on Line 5 Eglinton was named after Hakimi Avenue and the remaining portion of Lebovic Avenue in 2016.
