= Marjan Farsad =

Marjan Farsad مرجان فرساد
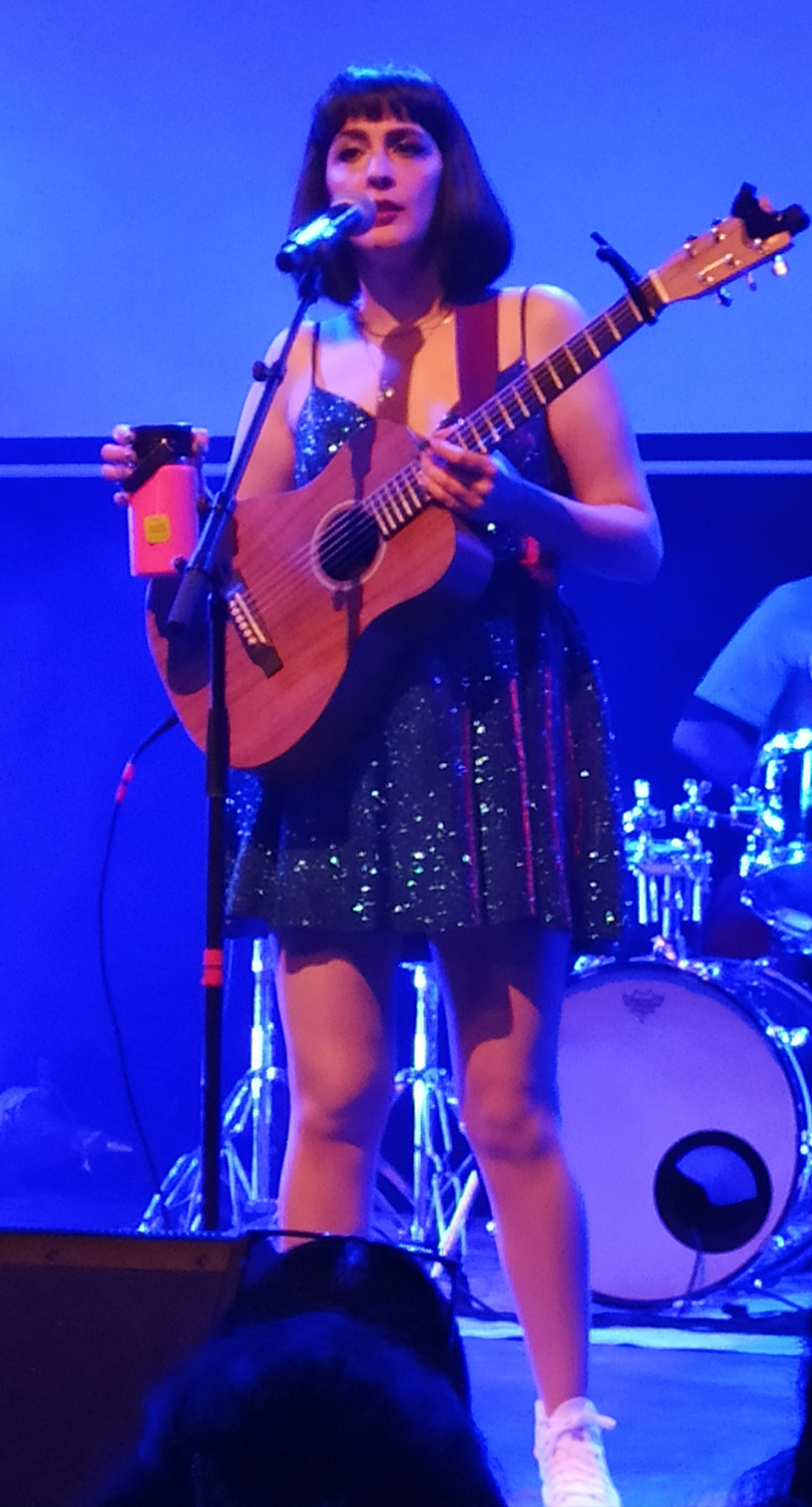

Background information
- Born: 1983; Tehran, Iran
- Origin: Iran
- Genres: Indie folk, Iranian traditional music, melancholic art pop, minimalist contemporary classical
- Years active: 2014–present

Marjan Farsad (Persian: مرجان فرساد, born in 1983 in Tehran), is an Iranian animator, illustrator, singer, and songwriter currently based in Montreal, Canada, and Brooklyn, New York. She moved to Montreal in 2008, where she continued to develop her unique artistic style, blending music and animation.

== Bibliography ==
Farsad’s songs, including popular tracks like My Orange and Our House, have gained significant attention on social media. Her music videos often showcase her animation work, as she not only performs but also creates the visual art and writes the music and lyrics herself. Her first album, Blue Flowers, was released in 2014, followed by her second album, White Tree, in 2020. Over the years, Farsad has held concerts in New York City, San Francisco, Toronto, and other cities, sharing her distinct blend of animation and music with audiences across North America.

== Albums ==
=== Blue Flowers (2014) ===
- Golhaye Abi (گلهای آبی) - Blue Flowers
- Khooneye Ma (خونه ما) - Our Home
- Dishab (دیشب)‌ - Last Night
- Afsane (افسانه) - Legend
- Porteghale Man (پرتغال من) - My Orange
- Setareye Soheil (ستاره سهیل) - Canopus
- Cheshmhaye Tameshki (چشمهای تمشکی) - Raspberry eyes
- Royaha (رویاها) - Dreams

=== White Tree (2020) ===
- Derakhte Sepid (درخت سپید) - White tree
- Sokoote Barfi (سکوت برفی) - Snowy Silence
- Khiaban (خیابان) - Street
- Emroozo O Farda (امروز و فردا) - Today And Tomorrow
- Crystals
- Abrisham (ابریشم) - Silk
- Italian Wine
- Parandeha (پرندها) - Birds
