= Shahin Assayesh =

Iranian publisher

Shahin Assayesh (born 1939, in Mashhad) is an Iranian publisher.

Assayesh was educated at the University of London, the University of Tehran, and the University of Mashhad. She was a secondary school teacher in Tehran before moving to the United Kingdom in 1976 and then Canada in 1983. She founded the Iranian Women's Quarterly Journal in 1986, and since 1991 has been President of Iranian Women's Publications.
