= Ehsan Mehrabi =

Iranian journalist

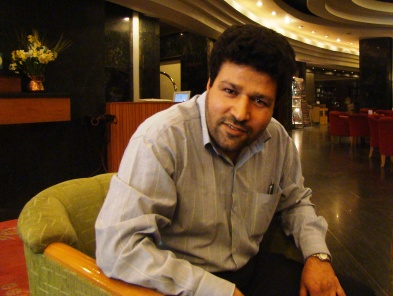
Ehsan Mehrabi

Ehsan Mahrabi, born in 1978, is an Iranian journalist who worked for reformist newspapers including Hambastegi, Etemad, and Etemad Melli. In addition to his work as a journalist, he has a background in civil engineering. At the time of his arrest, Mehrabi was working as a correspondent for Farhikhtegan newspaper in Iran.

== Government relations ==
Mehrabi was arrested with a group of other journalists on February 7, 2010. He was released from Evin Prison on May 2, 2010. The Islamic Revolutionary Court issued Mehrabi a one-year prison sentence, which began in January, 2011.
