= Rosewater (film) =

2014 film by Jon Stewart

- Theatrical release poster
- Directed by: Jon Stewart
- Screenplay by: Jon Stewart
- Based on: Then They Came for Me by Maziar Bahari and Aimee Molloy
- Produced by: Scott Rudin; Jon Stewart; Gigi Pritzker
- Starring: Gael García Bernal; Kim Bodnia; Haluk Bilginer; Shohreh Aghdashloo; Golshifteh Farahani
- Cinematography: Bobby Bukowski
- Edited by: Jay Rabinowitz
- Music by: Howard Shore
- Production companies: OddLot Entertainment; Busboy Productions
- Distributed by: Open Road Films
- Release dates: August 29, 2014 (Telluride); November 14, 2014 (United States)
- Running time: 103 minutes
- Country: United States
- Language: English
- Budget: $5–10 million
- Box office: $3.2 million

Rosewater is a 2014 American political drama film written, directed and produced by Jon Stewart, based on the memoir Then They Came for Me by Maziar Bahari and Aimee Molloy. It recounts Bahari's 2009 imprisonment by Iran, connected to an interview he participated in on The Daily Show that same year; Iranian authorities presented the interview as evidence that he was in communication with an American spy. Due to the content of the film, Stewart has been accused by Iran's state TV of being funded by Zionists and working with the CIA. The film was released in theaters on November 14, 2014. The film received generally positive reviews but was a box-office bomb, earning only a little over 3 million dollars.

== Plot ==
In 2009, London-based Iranian-Canadian journalist Maziar Bahari is detained in Iran after he reports on violence against protesters of the country's presidential election, as well as giving a satirical interview with Jason Jones of The Daily Show. While his pregnant fiancée waits for him, Bahari spends 118 days at Evin Prison being brutally interrogated.

Bahari is usually blindfolded while being interrogated, and his interrogator's sole distinguishing feature is that he smells of rosewater.

== Cast ==
- Gael García Bernal as Maziar Bahari, a journalist who was interrogated and tortured over 118 days in Iran
- Claire Foy as Paola Gourley
- Kim Bodnia as "Rosewater"
- Haluk Bilginer as Baba Akbar
- Shohreh Aghdashloo as Moloojoon
- Dimitri Leonidas as Davood
- Golshifteh Farahani as Maryam
- Arian Moayed as Hamid
- Amir El-Masry as Alireza
- Jason Jones as himself

== Production ==
Rosewater was filmed in Jordan, with footage from Iran, between June and mid-August 2013. It had a budget of $5–10 million.

== Release ==
On July 31, 2014, it was announced that the film would be released on November 7, 2014. The film premiered at the Telluride Film Festival on August 29, 2014, and it was screened in the Special Presentations section of the 2014 Toronto International Film Festival in September 2014.

== Reception ==
=== Box office ===
Rosewater grossed $3.2 million.

In its opening weekend, the film grossed $1.2 million from 371 theaters, finishing 13th at the box office.

=== Critical reception ===
Rosewater received mostly positive reviews from critics. On Rotten Tomatoes, the film holds a rating of 76%, based on 155 reviews, with an average rating of 6.7/10. The site's consensus reads, "Timely, solidly acted, and unabashedly earnest, Rosewater serves as an impressive calling card for first-time director Jon Stewart." On Metacritic, the film has a score of 67 out of 100, based on 35 critics, indicating "generally favorable reviews".
