= Jon Stewart =

American comedian and television host (born 1962)

- Stewart in 2026
- Born: Jonathan Stuart Leibowitz; November 28, 1962 (age 63); New York City, U.S.
- Education: College of William & Mary (BA)
- Spouse: Tracey Lynn McShane (m. 2000)
- Children: 2

Comedy career
- Years active: 1987–present
- Medium: Stand-up; television; film; books
- Genres: Political/news satire; observational comedy; surreal humor; blue comedy; insult comedy; deadpan
- Subjects: Mass media/news media/media criticism; American politics; Jewish culture; current events; pop culture

Jon Stewart (born Jonathan Stuart Leibowitz, November 28, 1962) is an American comedian, writer, producer, director, progressive political commentator, actor, and television host. Stewart is known as the host of the satirical news program The Daily Show on Comedy Central from 1999 to 2015 and part-time since 2024. He hosted The Problem with Jon Stewart on Apple TV+ from 2021 to 2023. Stewart has received numerous accolades, including 25 Primetime Emmy Awards, 2 Grammy Awards, and 5 Peabody Awards. He was honored with the Bronze Medallion in 2019 and the Mark Twain Prize for American Humor in 2022.

Stewart started as a stand-up comedian but branched into television as host of Short Attention Span Theater for Comedy Central. He went on to host You Wrote It, You Watch It (1992–1993) and then The Jon Stewart Show (1993–1995), both on MTV, until The Jon Stewart Show was retooled, dropped by the network, and moved to syndication. He has also appeared in several films, including Big Daddy (1999) and Death to Smoochy (2002). Stewart became host of The Daily Show in 1999, where he was also a writer and co-executive producer. After he joined, The Daily Show steadily gained popularity and critical acclaim, and during his tenure won numerous Emmy Awards and was nominated for news and journalism awards. In 2010, he and Stephen Colbert headlined the Rally to Restore Sanity and/or Fear. In 2012, assumed control of the satirical Colbert Super PAC, retitled "The Definitely Not Coordinating With Stephen Colbert Super PAC".

After leaving The Daily Show, Stewart maintained a low profile in entertainment industry circles, but used his celebrity and voice in a sustained advocacy for 9/11 first responders and war veterans' health benefits. In 2019, he received the New York City Bronze Medallion for his "tireless advocacy, inspiration, and leadership (helping to) pass the permanent authorization of the September 11th Victim Compensation Fund Act". He continued using his platform as an advocate for veterans by being instrumental in helping pass the Honoring our PACT Act of 2022, which expands healthcare access and funding to veterans exposed to toxic substances during their service including burn pits. In November 2022, Stewart was awarded the Bronze De Fleury Medal by the U.S. Army Engineer Regiment for his advocacy on behalf of military veterans exposed to toxic burn pits.

Stewart hosted the 78th and 80th Academy Awards. He is the co-author of the best-selling satirical books America (The Book): A Citizen's Guide to Democracy Inaction in 2004, and Earth (The Book): A Visitor's Guide to the Human Race in 2010. He was the executive producer of The Colbert Report (2005–2014), The Nightly Show with Larry Wilmore (2015–2016), and The Late Show with Stephen Colbert (2015–2026). In February 2024, he returned to The Daily Show for Monday episodes, as well as in the role of an executive producer.

== Early life and education ==
Stewart was born Jonathan Stuart Leibowitz at Doctors Hospital on the Upper East Side of Manhattan, New York City. His father, Donald Leibowitz (1931–2013), was an energy coordinator for the New Jersey Department of the Treasury, and his mother, Marian Leibowitz (née Laskin), was a teacher and later an educational consultant. Stewart's family is Ashkenazi Jewish. One of his grandfathers was born in Manzhouli, present-day China. He is the second of four sons, with older brother Lawrence and younger brothers Dan and Matthew.

Stewart's parents divorced when he was eleven, and he became largely estranged from his father. Due to their strained relationship, Stewart dropped his surname and began using his middle name alone, stating: "There was a thought of using my mother's maiden name, but I thought that would be just too big a 'fuck you' to my dad.... Did I have some problems with my father? Yes. Yet people always view [changing my last name] through the prism of ethnic identity." He had his last name legally changed to "Stewart" in 2001. In 2015, he described his relationship with his father as "still complicated" after his father's death two years earlier. Stewart and his older brother, Lawrence, who was previously the chief operating officer of NYSE Euronext (the parent company of the New York Stock Exchange), grew up in Lawrenceville, New Jersey. Stewart has stated that he experienced much antisemitism as a child, having been bullied frequently due to his Jewish identity. He describes himself in high school as "very into Eugene Debs and a bit of a leftist". Stewart grew up in the era of the Vietnam War and the Watergate scandal, which inspired in him "a healthy skepticism towards official reports." His first job was working with his brother at a Woolworth's store, and he has jokingly said that being fired by Lawrence himself was one of the "scarring events" of his youth. He has also credited renowned television producer Norman Lear as someone who "raised me."

After graduating from Lawrence High School in 1980, Stewart attended the College of William & Mary in Williamsburg, Virginia, where he initially majored in chemistry before switching to psychology. While at William & Mary, Stewart became a member of the Pi Kappa Alpha fraternity, but eventually began disassociating himself from other members, leaving the fraternity altogether after six months. "My college career was waking up late, memorizing someone else's notes, doing bong hits, and going to soccer practice", he later said. He was a three-year starter in 1981, 1982 and 1983 with the Tribe men's soccer team. He had 10 goals and 12 assists on a squad that went 40–15–9 (.695) in his three seasons with the program. He is listed as Jon Leibowitz in official William & Mary Athletics records. The former head coach of the Tribe men's soccer team from 1971 to 2003, Al Albert, describes Jon as "athletic and feisty and quick" and added that he "wasn't the most technical or clinical player, but he could make things happen." He graduated from William & Mary in 1984 with a Bachelor of Arts. Twenty years later, the college awarded him an honorary Master of Arts degree.

After college, Stewart held numerous jobs: contingency planner for the New Jersey Department of Human Services, contract administrator for the City University of New York, puppeteer for children with disabilities, soccer coach at Gloucester High School in Virginia, caterer, busboy, shelf stocker at Woolworth's, bartender at the Franklin Corner Tavern (a blue-collar bar in Lawrence), and bartender at the City Gardens nightclub in Trenton, New Jersey. He has said that working at City Gardens was a pivotal moment for him: "Finding this place City Gardens was like, 'Oh, maybe I'm not a giant weirdo. Maybe there are other people who have a similar sense of yearning for something other than what they have now.' I think it inspired a lot of people, man. It was a very creative environment. It was a place of great possibility."

== Career ==
=== 1986–1992: Stand-up and early career ===
With a reputation for being a funny man in school, Stewart moved back to New York City in 1986 to pursue a career in comedy, trying his hand at the comedy club circuit but could not muster the courage to get on stage until the following year. He made his stand-up debut at The Bitter End, where one of his comedic idols, Woody Allen, also began. He began using the stage name Jon Stewart by dropping his last name and changing the spelling of his middle name, Stuart, to Stewart. He often jokes that it was because people had trouble pronouncing Leibowitz, or it "sounded too Hollywood" (a reference to Lenny Bruce's joke on the same theme). He has implied that the name change was due to a strained relationship with his father, with whom Stewart no longer had any contact.

Stewart became a regular at the Comedy Cellar, where he was the last performer every night. For two years, he performed at 2 a.m. while developing his comedy style. In 1989, he landed his first television job as a writer for Caroline's Comedy Hour. In 1990, he began co-hosting Comedy Central's Short Attention Span Theater with Patty Rosborough. In 1992, he hosted the short-lived You Wrote It, You Watch It on MTV, which invited viewers to send in their stories to be acted out by the comedy troupe The State.

Stewart said that his career did not take off until his March 6, 1992, appearance on NBC's Late Night with David Letterman. He was considered to take over the show when Letterman left it, but it was given to a then relatively unknown Conan O'Brien. He co-hosted MTV Spring Break '93 Blind Date from Daytona Beach with Melissa Rivers.

=== 1993–1995: The Jon Stewart Show ===
Later in 1993, Stewart developed The Jon Stewart Show, a talk show on MTV, which was later dropped by the network and was syndicated for its last two years. The Jon Stewart Show was the first talk show on that network and was an instant hit, becoming the second-highest rated MTV show, behind Beavis and Butt-Head. In 1994, Paramount canceled The Arsenio Hall Show and, with new corporate sibling MTV (through MTV parent Viacom's acquisition of the studio), launched an hour-long syndicated late-night version of The Jon Stewart Show. Many local affiliates had moved Hall's show to 2 a.m. during its decline, and Stewart's show inherited such early morning time slots in many cities. Ratings were dismal and the show was canceled in June 1995.

Among the fans of the show was David Letterman, who was the final guest of The Jon Stewart Show. Letterman signed Stewart with his production company, Worldwide Pants. Stewart then became a frequent guest host for Tom Snyder on The Late Late Show with Tom Snyder, which was produced by Letterman and aired after the Late Show on CBS. This led to much speculation that Stewart would soon replace Snyder permanently, but instead, Stewart was offered the time slot after Snyder's, which he turned down.

=== 1994–1997: Film and other TV work ===
Stewart's first film role was a bit part in the box-office bomb Mixed Nuts. He landed a minor part in The First Wives Club, but his scene was deleted. In 1995, Stewart signed a three-year deal with Miramax. Stewart played romantic leads in the films Playing by Heart and Wishful Thinking. He had a supporting role in the romantic comedy Since You've Been Gone and in the horror film The Faculty. Other films were planned for Stewart to write and star in, but they were never produced. Stewart maintained a relationship with Miramax founders Harvey and Bob Weinstein and appeared in films they produced, including Jay and Silent Bob Strike Back, Doogal, and the documentary Wordplay.

In 1996, Stewart hosted a short-lived talk show entitled, Where's Elvis This Week?, which was a half-hour, weekly comedy television program. It aired on Sunday nights in the United Kingdom on BBC Two. It was filmed at the CBS Broadcast Center in New York City and featured a set of panelists, two from the UK and two from the United States, who discussed news items and cultural issues. The show premiered in the UK on October 6, 1996; five episodes aired in total. Notable panelists included Dave Chappelle, Eddie Izzard, Phill Jupitus, Nora Ephron, Craig Kilborn, Christopher Hitchens, Armando Iannucci, Norm Macdonald, and Helen Gurley Brown. In 1997, Stewart was chosen as the host and interviewer for George Carlin's tenth HBO special, George Carlin: 40 Years of Comedy. Stewart had a recurring role in The Larry Sanders Show, playing himself as an occasional substitute and possible successor to late-night talk show host Larry Sanders (played by Garry Shandling). Stewart also headlined the 1997 White House Correspondents' Dinner.

=== 1998–2015: The Daily Show ===
In 1998, Stewart hosted the television special Elmopalooza, celebrating 30 years of Sesame Street. He has guest-starred on other sitcoms, including The Nanny, Dr. Katz, Professional Therapist, Spin City and NewsRadio. The same year, Stewart released his first book, Naked Pictures of Famous People (1998), a collection of humorous short stories and essays. The book reached The New York Times Best Seller List. In the mid-1990s, Stewart launched his own production company, Busboy Productions, naming the company in reference to his previous job as a busboy. Stewart signed a deal with Miramax to develop projects through his company, but none of his ideas have been produced. After Stewart's success as host and producer of The Daily Show, he revived Busboy Productions with Daily Show producers Ben Karlin and Rich Korson. In 2002, Busboy planned to produce a sitcom for NBC starring Stephen Colbert, but the show did not come to fruition.

In 1999, when Craig Kilborn left the show to replace Tom Snyder on The Late Late Show, Stewart began hosting The Daily Show on Comedy Central. The Daily Show blends humor with the day's top news stories, usually in politics, while simultaneously poking fun at politicians, newsmakers, and the news media. In an interview on The O'Reilly Factor, Stewart denied the show has any intentional political agenda, saying the goal was "schnicks and giggles" and that "[t]he same weakness that drove me into comedy also informs my show", meaning that he was uncomfortable talking without hearing the audience laugh. In his first Daily Show on-air appearance on January 11, 1999, Stewart told his guest that evening, Michael J. Fox, that he felt as if "this is my bar mitzvah". His style was described by one critic as, "Stewart does not offer us cynicism for its own sake, but as a playful way to offer the kinds of insights that are not permitted in more serious news formats that slavishly cling to official account of events."

He appeared in Half Baked as an "enhancement smoker" and in Big Daddy as Adam Sandler's roommate; he has joked on the Daily Show and in the documentary The Aristocrats that to get the role, he slept with Sandler. Stewart often makes fun of his appearances in the high-profile flop, Death to Smoochy, in which he played a treacherous television executive; and the animated film Doogal, where he voiced the villain Zeebad. In 2007, Stewart made a cameo appearance as himself in Evan Almighty, which starred former Daily Show correspondent Steve Carell. In the movie, Stewart was seen on a television screen in a fictional Daily Show episode poking fun at Carell's character for building an ark.

Until Trevor Noah permanently took over the show in 2015, Stewart hosted almost all airings of the program, except for a few occasions when correspondents such as Stephen Colbert, Rob Corddry, Jason Jones, and Steve Carell subbed for him, and during John Oliver's stint as host during the summer of 2013. Stewart won twenty Primetime Emmy Awards for The Daily Show as either a writer or producer, and two for producing The Colbert Report (2013–14), earning a total of twenty-two Primetime Emmy Awards, the most wins for a male individual. In 2005, Stewart and The Daily Show received the Grammy Award for Best Comedy Album for the audiobook edition of America (The Book): A Citizen's Guide to Democracy Inaction. In 2000 and 2004, the show won two Peabody Awards for its coverage of the US presidential elections in those years, called "Indecision 2000" and "Indecision 2004", respectively.

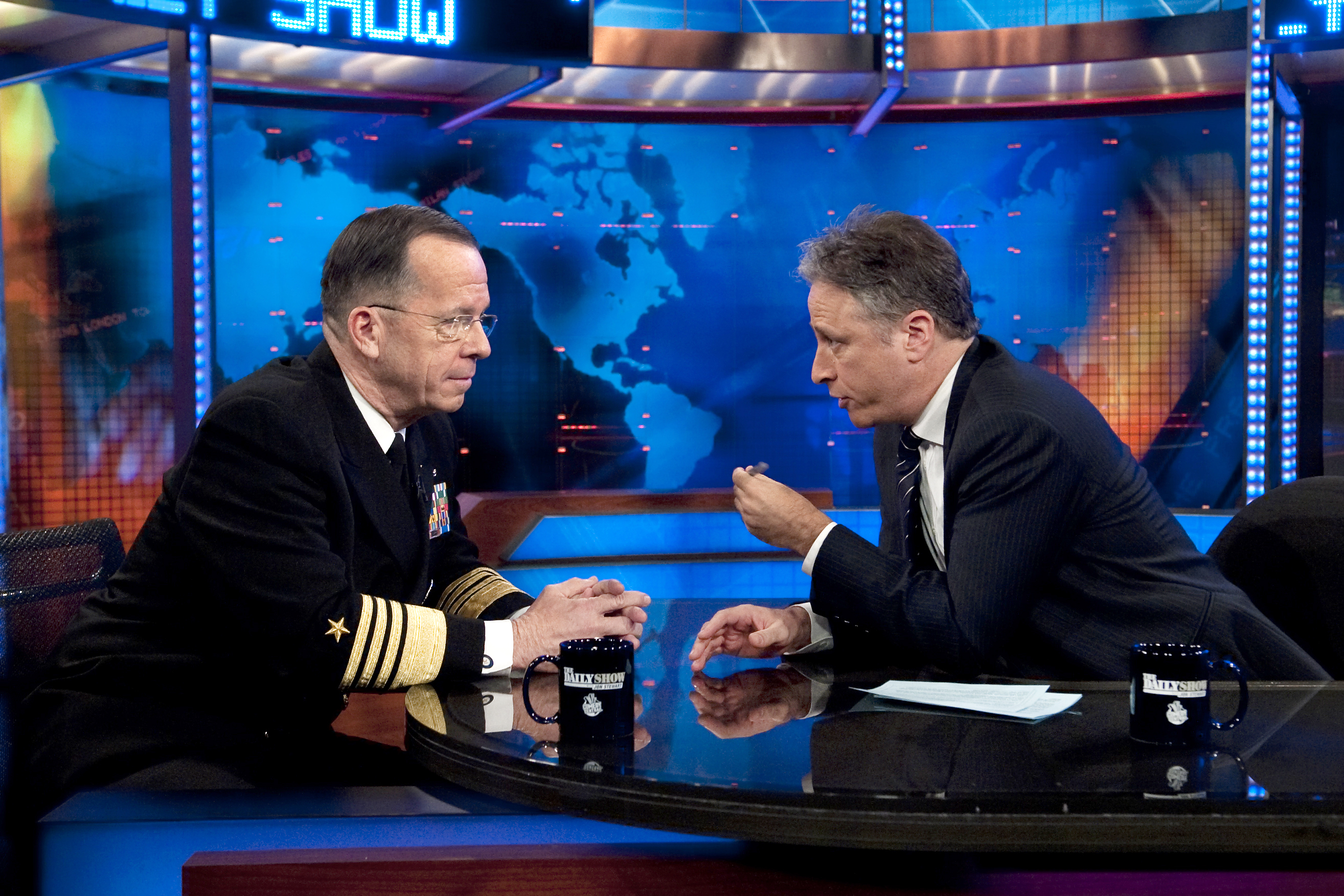
Chairman of the Joint Chiefs of Staff, US Navy Admiral Michael Mullen, being interviewed by Jon Stewart for the February 3, 2011, episode of The Daily Show

The show of September 20, 2001, the first show after the attacks of September 11, 2001, began with no introduction. Before this, the introduction included footage of a fly-in toward the World Trade Center and New York City. The first nine minutes of the show included a tearful Stewart discussing his personal view on the event. His remarks ended as follows:

The view ... from my apartment ... was the World Trade Center ... and now it's gone, and they attacked it. This symbol of American ingenuity, and strength, and labor, and imagination and commerce, and it is gone. But you know what the view is now? The Statue of Liberty. The view from the South of Manhattan is now the Statue of Liberty. You can't beat that.

In mid-2002, amid rumors that David Letterman was going to switch from CBS to ABC when his contract ran out, Stewart was rumored as Letterman's replacement on CBS. Ultimately, Letterman renewed his contract with CBS.

In late 2002, ABC offered Stewart his own talk show to air right after Nightline. Stewart's contract with The Daily Show was near expiring, and he expressed a strong interest. ABC, however, decided to give another Comedy Central figure, Jimmy Kimmel, the post-Nightline slot. In 2004, Stewart and The Daily Show writing staff released America (The Book): A Citizen's Guide to Democracy Inaction, a mock high-school civics textbook offering insights into the unique American system of government, dissecting its institutions, explaining its history and processes, and satirizing such popular American political precepts as "one man, one vote", "government by the people", and "every vote counts". The book sold millions of copies upon its 2004 release and ended the year as a top-fifteen best seller. He also delivered the commencement address for the class of 2004 at his alma mater, the College of William & Mary. In 2005, Stewart provided the voice of President James A. Garfield for the audiobook version of Sarah Vowell's Assassination Vacation.

In 2005, Comedy Central reached an agreement with Busboy in which Comedy Central would provide financial backing for the production company. Comedy Central has a first-look agreement on all projects, after which Busboy is free to shop them to other networks. The deal spawned the Daily Show spin-off The Colbert Report and its replacement, The Nightly Show with Larry Wilmore. Other projects include the sitcom pilot Three Strikes, the documentary Sportsfan, the series Important Things with Demetri Martin, and the film The Donor. In 2007, Stewart voiced Mort Sinclaire, former TV comedy writer and communist, on Stephen Colbert's audiobook version of I Am America (And So Can You!).

On April 4, 2006, Stewart confronted US Senator John McCain (R-AZ) on The Daily Show about his decision to appear at Liberty University, an institution founded by Jerry Falwell whom McCain previously had denounced as one of the "agents of intolerance". In the interchange, Stewart asked McCain, "You're not freaking out on us? Are you freaking out on us, because if you're freaking out ... and you're going into the crazy base world—are you going into crazy base world?" McCain replied, "Just– just– just a little" and "I'm afraid so." The clip was played on CNN, was noted and discussed in more detail in the blogosphere and was followed up on in the mainstream media.

In 2007, The Daily Show was involved in former correspondent Stephen Colbert's announcement that he would run for president in 2008. In 2008, Stewart appeared on the news program Democracy Now!. A 2008 New York Times story questioned whether he was, in a phrase originally used to describe longtime network news anchor Walter Cronkite, "the most trusted man in America".

On April 28, 2009, during a discussion on torture with Clifford May, Stewart stated that former President Harry S. Truman was a war criminal for his use of the atomic bomb on Japan during World War II. He defended his view moments later: "Here's what I think of the atom bombs. I think if you dropped an atom bomb fifteen miles offshore and you said, 'The next one's coming and hitting you', then I would think it's okay. To drop it on a city, and kill a hundred thousand people? Yeah. I think that's criminal." On April 30, Stewart apologized on his program, and stated he did not believe Truman was a war criminal: "I shouldn't have said that, and I did. So I say right now, no, I don't believe that to be the case. The atomic bomb, a very complicated decision in the context of a horrific war, and I walk that back because it was in my estimation a stupid thing to say."

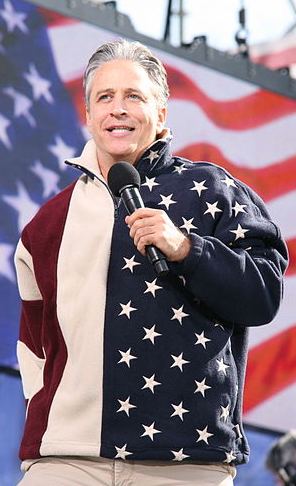
Stewart at the Rally to Restore Sanity and/or Fear in 2010

On September 16, 2010, Stewart and Stephen Colbert announced a rally for October 30, known as the Rally to Restore Sanity and/or Fear. It took place on the National Mall in Washington, D.C., and attracted an estimated 215,000 participants. In December 2010, Stewart was credited by the White House, other media, and political news outlets for bringing awareness of the Republican filibuster on the James Zadroga 9/11 Health and Compensation Act to the public, leading to the ultimate passing of the bill that provides health benefits to first responders whose health has been adversely affected by their work at Ground Zero.

In March 2010, Stewart announced that he had optioned rights to the story of journalist Maziar Bahari, who was imprisoned in Iran for 118 days. On the June 6, 2011, episode of The Daily Show, Stewart again hosted Bahari, and in March 2013, he announced that he was leaving the show for 12 weeks to direct the film version of Bahari's 2011 book, Then They Came For Me. Stewart's screenplay adaptation is Rosewater. It premiered at the September 2014 Toronto International Film Festival, receiving "generally favorable" reviews, and was released to general audiences on November 14, 2014.

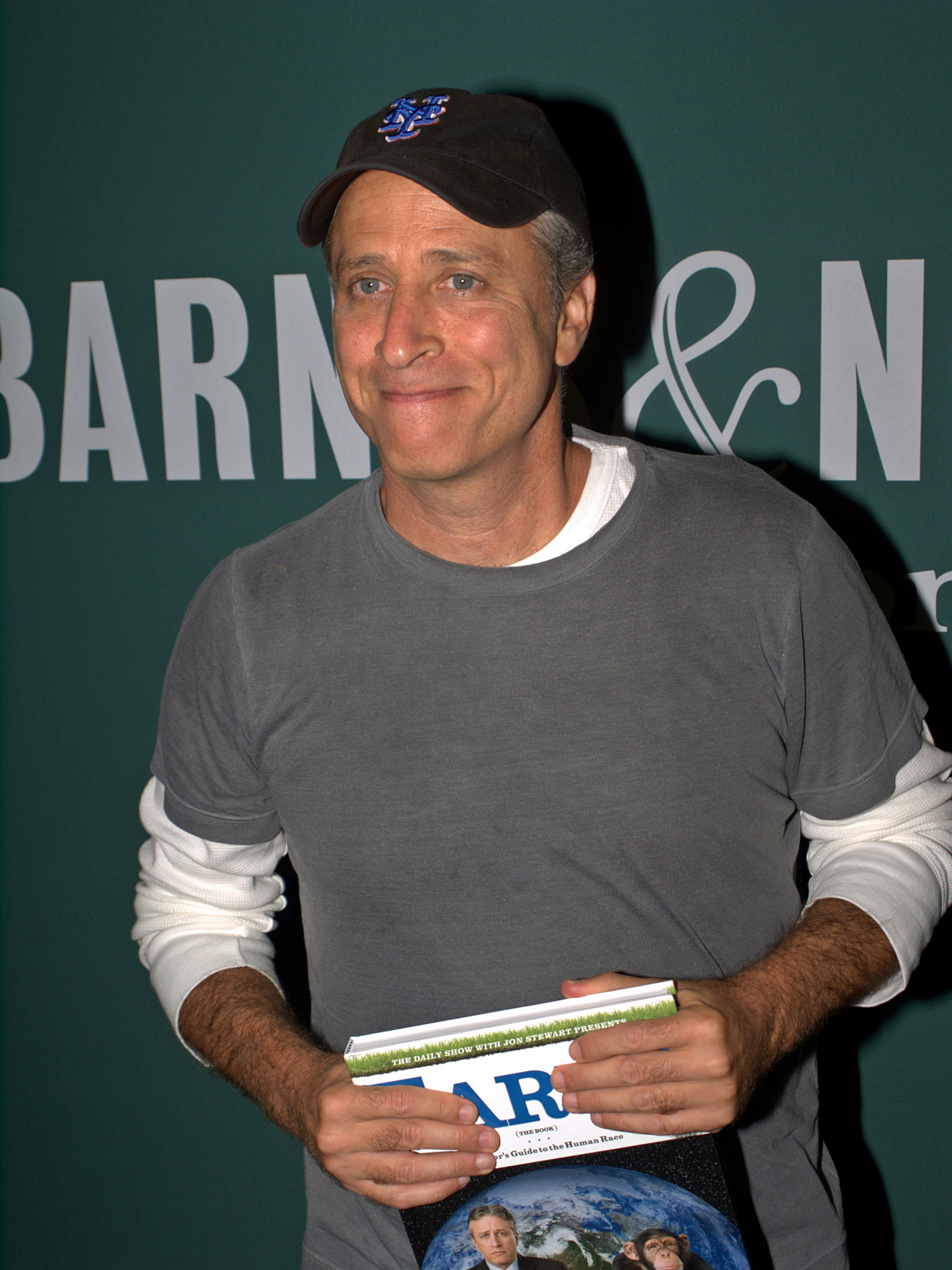
Stewart at the launch of his book, Earth (The Book), in New York, September 27, 2010

In 2010, Stewart and The Daily Show writing staff released a sequel to their first book entitled, Earth (The Book): A Visitor's Guide to the Human Race. The book is meant to serve as a Baedeker style travel guide for an alien civilization that discovers Earth after humanity has died out, most likely by its own hands. In April 2010, Comedy Central renewed Stewart's contract to host The Daily Show into 2013. According to a Forbes list of celebrities in 2008, he was earning $14 million a year. The New York Times opined that Stewart is "the modern-day equivalent of Edward R. Murrow" and the UK national newspaper The Independent called him the "satirist-in-chief". In an interview, Senator John McCain described Stewart as "a modern-day Will Rogers and Mark Twain".

On the show of January 10, 2011, Stewart began with a monologue about the shootings in Tucson, Arizona. He said he wished the "ramblings of crazy people didn't in any way resemble how we actually talk to each other on television". Before a commercial break, Stewart told viewers that the show would continue as usual the next night. After the commercial break, the show featured a rerun of a field piece done by Jason Jones two years earlier.

In March 2012, Stewart interviewed Bruce Springsteen for Rolling Stone. Writer Wyatt Cenac said that Stewart cursed him out after Cenac acknowledged he was uncomfortable about a June 2011 Daily Show bit about Republican presidential candidate Herman Cain (reported in July 2015).

In March 2013, it was announced that Stewart would be taking a 12-week hiatus from The Daily Show to direct Rosewater, which is based on the book Then They Came for Me by Maziar Bahari. Beginning June 10, 2013, The Daily Show correspondent John Oliver assumed primary hosting duties during Stewart's break. The TV Guide annual survey for 2013 star salaries showed that Stewart was the highest-paid late night host, making an estimated $25–30 million per year. On July 14, 2014, Stewart interviewed Hillary Clinton about the Middle East. Clinton's condemnations of Hamas led Stewart to ask her: "But don't you think they would look at that though as, they've given a lot of different things a chance and these are the only guys to them that are giving any resistance to what their condition is?" For Gazans living in that situation, he said Hamas could be viewed as "freedom fighters".

==== The Daily Show departure ====
During a taping of the show on February 10, 2015, Stewart announced he was leaving The Daily Show. Comedy Central president Michele Ganeless confirmed Stewart's retirement with a statement. Later, it was announced that South African comedian Trevor Noah would succeed Stewart as the host of the show. On April 20, 2015, Stewart indicated that his final show would be on August 6, 2015.

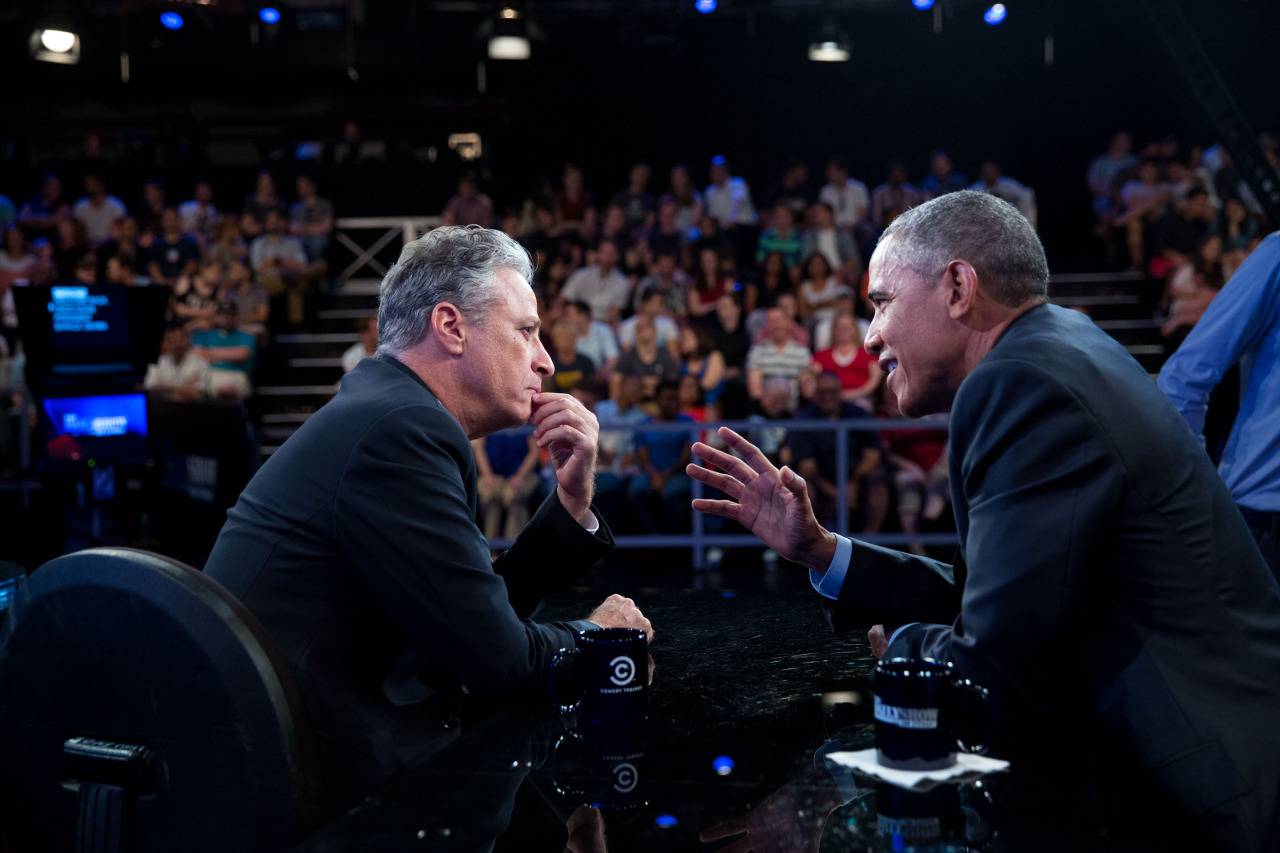
Stewart interviewing President Barack Obama in 2015

On July 28, 2015, Darren Samuelsohn of Politico reported that, twice, Stewart had been at the White House for previously unreported meetings with President Obama: once in October 2011 and once in February 2014. Michael D. Shear of The New York Times also picked up on the story. Stewart responded on his show by pointing out that the meetings were listed in the president's publicly available visitor log and that he has been asked to meet privately by many prominent individuals, including Roger Ailes of Fox News. He said Obama encouraged him not to make young Americans cynical about their government and Stewart said that he replied that he was "skeptically idealistic".

On June 19, 2015, in the wake of the Charleston Church Shooting, Stewart decided not to write jokes for the opening monologue. Elaborating on his decision, Stewart stated, "I honestly have nothing other than just sadness". Stewart spoke about the racial disparity and injustices in America, saying "The Confederate flag flies over South Carolina ... and the roads are named for Confederate generals" describing it as "racial wallpaper". Instead he designated a large portion of the show to his guest that night Malala Yousafzai, calling her "an incredible inspiration," and that "to be quite honest with you, I don't think there's anyone else in the world I would rather talk to tonight than Malala: So that's what we're going to do. And sorry about no jokes."

On August 5, 2015, Stewart's friend of 30 years, comedian Louis C.K., was selected to be the last guest before the final Daily Show episode with Stewart helming the show. C.K. joked that he was there "representing comedy to say good job".

The hour-long-plus final Daily Show on August 6 featured reunions with former correspondents Stephen Colbert, Steve Carell, John Oliver, Samantha Bee, Hasan Minhaj, Ed Helms, Kristen Schaal, Larry Wilmore, Jessica Williams, Aasif Mandvi, Lewis Black, John Hodgman, Rob Corddry, Olivia Munn, Josh Gad, Michael Che, and Mo Rocca and cameo video clips from people Stewart had targeted over the years, including Hillary Clinton, John McCain, Lindsey Graham, Chris Christie, John Kerry, Chuck Schumer, Bill O'Reilly, Wolf Blitzer, Joe Scarborough, and Mika Brzezinski. During the final episode, there was a pre-taped behind-the-scenes look at the show spoofing the long-take Copacabana scene from Goodfellas, featuring a brief appearance by Martin Scorsese. It concluded with a performance by Bruce Springsteen and the E Street Band.

=== 2015–2023: Stand-up and Apple TV+ series ===
He also guest starred in the animated series American Dad!, and The Simpsons as well as the children's television series Between the Lions, Sesame Street, Jack's Big Music Show, and Gravity Falls. After Stewart's departure from The Daily Show, he was listed as an executive producer on The Late Show with Stephen Colbert. In addition, Stewart has presented occasional comedic monologues filled with political and media commentary.

In November 2015, it was announced that Stewart signed a four-year deal with HBO that would include exclusive digital content for HBO NOW, HBO Go, and other platforms. HBO programming president Casey Bloys has said that "the idea is it will be an animated parody of a cable news network with an Onion-like portal." The team began working with the cloud graphics company, OTOY, to build a system for creating content. Working on the project were Mike Brown, Steve Waltien, Chelsea Devantez, Lucy Steiner, Kate James, and Robby Slowik. The team tested material in Red Bank, New Jersey, at The Count Basie Theatre Performing Arts Academy. The show's premiere was moved several times, from fall 2016, to the first quarter of 2017, and then cancelled on May 23, 2017. The cancelation statement read: "HBO and Jon Stewart have decided not to proceed with a short-form digital animated project... We all thought the project had great potential but there were technical issues in terms of production and distribution that proved too difficult given the quick turnaround and topical nature of the material. We're excited to report that we have some future projects together which you will be hearing about in the near future".

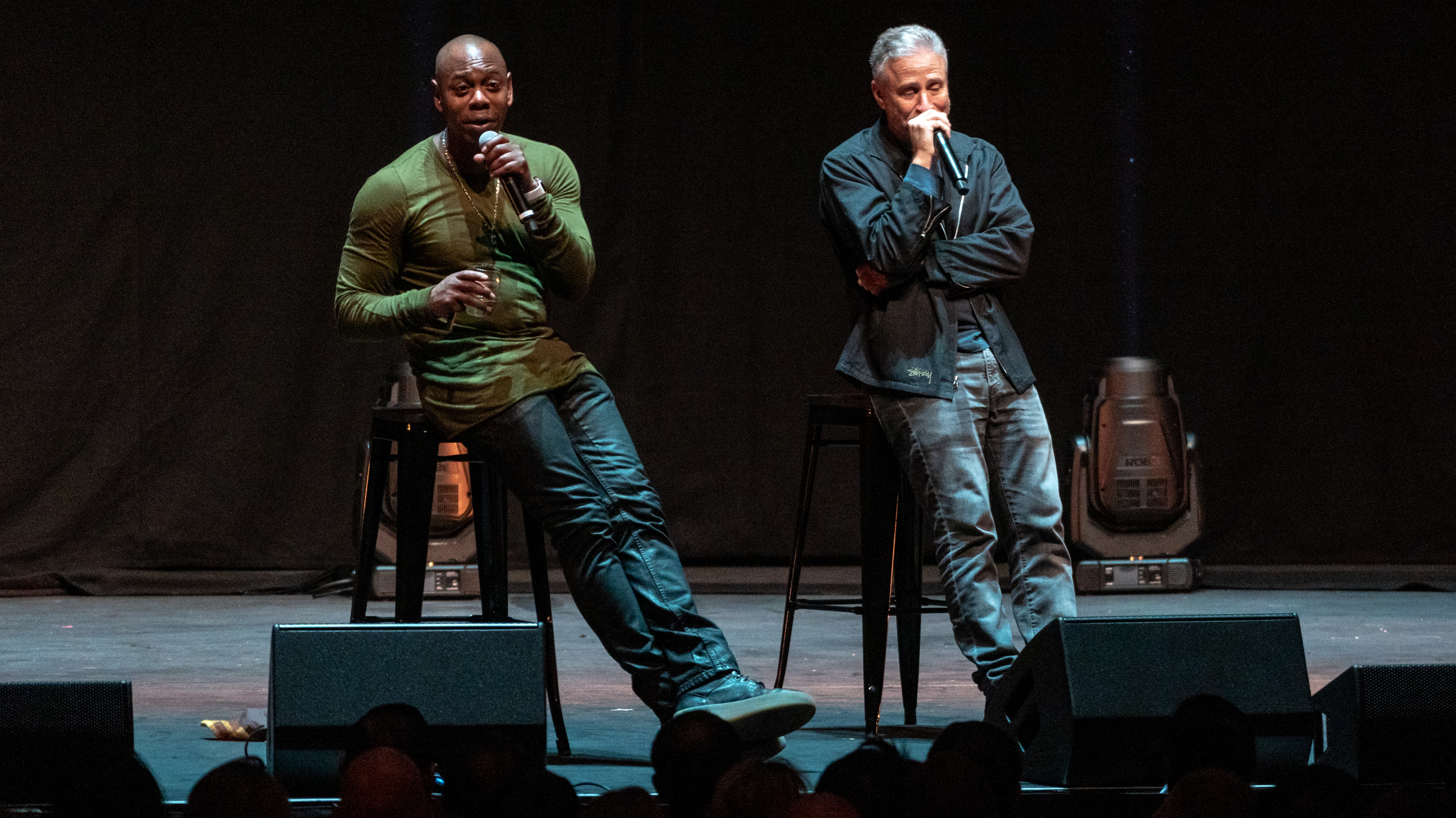
Dave Chappelle with Stewart performing at Royal Albert Hall in 2018

In July 2017, HBO announced Stewart would produce a stand-up comedy special for the network, his first stand-up special since 1996. Ultimately, no special aired. In 2018, Stewart and Dave Chappelle joined forces for a duo comedy tour in the United States, and across the United Kingdom. Stewart performed standup in the 13th Annual Standup for Heroes event alongside John Oliver and Hasan Minhaj.

On directing, Stewart noted on Employee of the Month that The Daily Show influenced his directing process more than his acting gigs did. He said, "It's about the collaboration. It's about understanding. Doing a show taught me this process of clarity of vision, but the flexibility of process. So know your intention, know where you're wanting to go with the scene with the way that you want it to go, the momentum shifts, the emphasis, where you want it to be." He also expressed interest in directing more films. Stewart directed the political satire Irresistible, released in June 2020, which follows a demoralized Democratic strategist (played by Daily Show alumnus Steve Carell), who helps a retired veteran (Chris Cooper) run for mayor in a small, blue collar town in Wisconsin.

After his contract with HBO ended, Stewart signed a multi-year show deal with Apple. On September 30, 2021, Stewart's new series, The Problem with Jon Stewart, premiered on Apple TV+. The series featured hour-long, single-subject episodes. In addition to hosting the show, Stewart served as executive producer through his company, Busboy Productions. The show was canceled after two seasons, allegedly due to Apple executives disagreeing with coverage of China and artificial intelligence. Apple's cancelation attracted criticism from the United States House Select Committee on Strategic Competition between the United States and the Chinese Communist Party.

In July 2022, a Politico writer named Juleanna Glover wrote an op-ed titled "If Tucker Runs in 2024, Here's Who the Democrats Need." In the op-ed, Glover called for Stewart to run for president in 2024. Stewart promptly responded to the viral article with a Tweet, stating "Ummm... no thank you." In 2023, Stewart performed at the Netflix Is a Joke comedy festival in Los Angeles.

=== 2024–present: Return to The Daily Show ===
Stewart began hosting a weekly podcast called The Weekly Show with Jon Stewart in 2024.

In January 2024, it was confirmed that Stewart would return to The Daily Show as the weekly Monday guest host starting February 12, 2024. It was also confirmed that Stewart and his manager James Dixon would serve as executive producers, alongside Stewart's former mentee Jen Flanz, for all Daily Show episodes through 2025. In May 2024, it was announced that Stewart would additionally begin hosting The Weekly Show, an original podcast from Comedy Central. Stewart and The Daily Show team won the Primetime Emmy Award for Best Talk Series, his 23rd Emmy. In late October, Stewart extended his contract by one year to remain host until the end of 2025. In November 2025, he extended his contract by a year to remain host until the end of 2026. In October 2026, he again extended his contract, but this time by two years. He will host through 2028.

In December 2025, he made his Broadway debut in All Out: Comedy About Ambition at the Nederlander Theatre.

== Hosting and public speaking ==
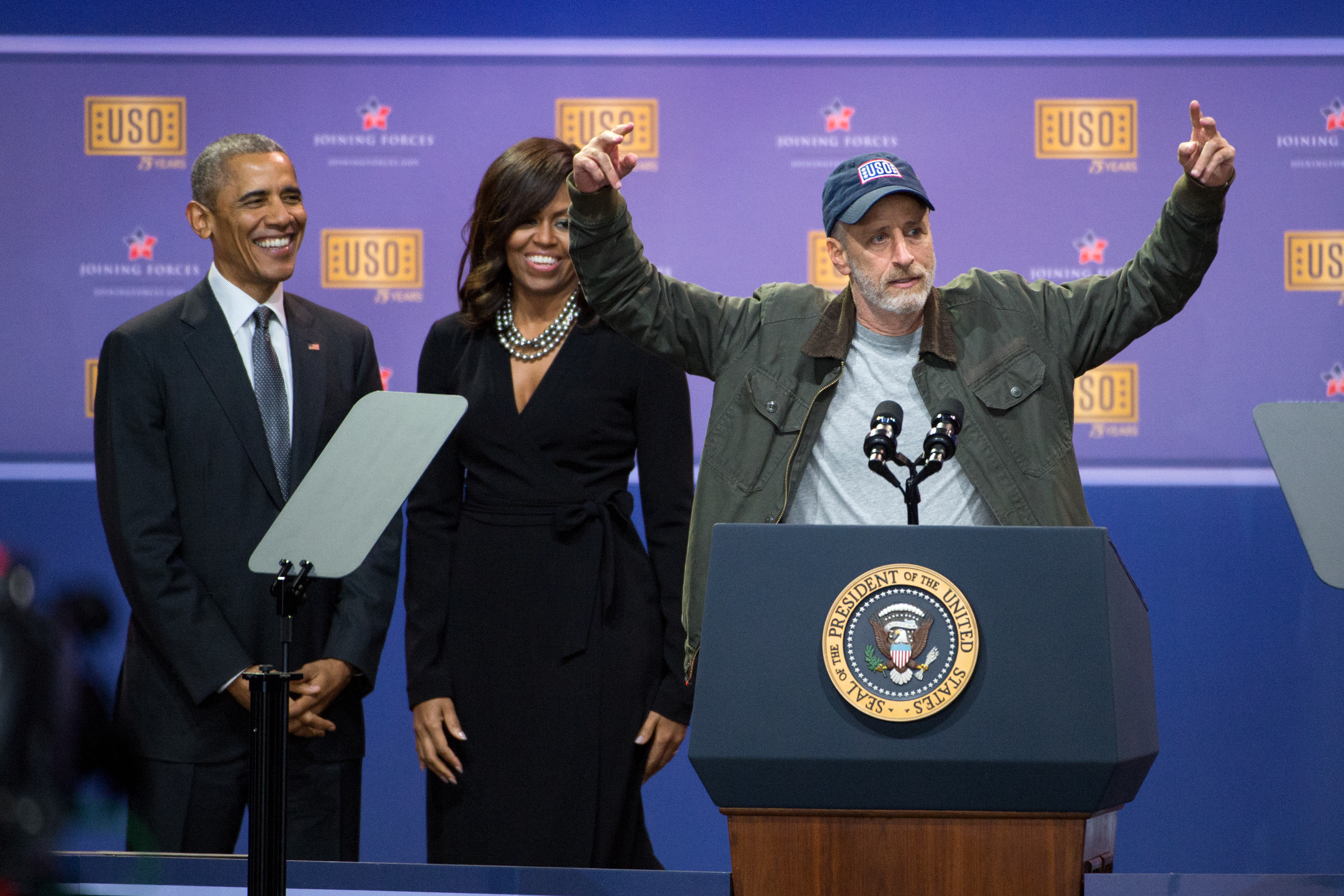
Barack Obama and Michelle Obama with Stewart celebrating the 75th anniversary of the USO in 2016

Stewart has hosted the Grammy Awards twice, in 2001 and in 2002, and the 78th Academy Awards, which were held March 5, 2006, at the Kodak Theatre in Hollywood. Critical response to Stewart's performance was mixed. Roger Ebert compared him favorably to legendary Oscar host Johnny Carson. Other reviewers were less positive; Tom Shales of The Washington Post said that Stewart hosted with "smug humorlessness". James Poniewozik of TIME said that Stewart was a bad host, but a great "anti-host" in that he poked fun at parts of the broadcast that deserved it, which lent him a degree of authenticity with the non-Hollywood audience. Stewart and correspondent John Oliver later poked fun at his lackluster reception on The Daily Show coverage of the 79th Academy Awards by saying that the "demon of last year's Oscars had finally been exorcised".

Stewart returned to host the 80th Academy Awards on February 24, 2008. The reception to his performance was better this time. Matthew Gilbert of the Boston Globe felt the ceremony was average, but praised Stewart, writing that, "It was good to see Jon Stewart being Jon Stewart. He is shaping up to be a dependable Oscar host for the post-Billy Crystal years. He's not musical, but he's versatile enough to swing smoothly between jokes about politics, Hollywood, new media, and, most importantly, hair." Variety columnist Brian Lowry lauded Stewart's performance noting that he "earned his keep by maintaining a playful, irreverent tone throughout the night, whether it was jesting about Cate Blanchett's versatility or watching Lawrence of Arabia on an iPhone screen."

In December 2009, Stewart gave a speech at the John F. Kennedy Center for the Performing Arts honoring Bruce Springsteen, one of that year's Kennedy Center Honors recipients, and of whom Stewart is a fan. Stewart gave another speech paying tribute to Springsteen in February 2013 as part of the singer's MusiCares Person of the Year award ceremony.

Stewart began a comedic feud with WWE wrestler Seth Rollins in March 2015, and appeared on WWE Raw during a Daily Show-styled segment hosted by Rollins. On August 23, 2015, Stewart returned to host the WWE's SummerSlam at the Barclays Center in Brooklyn, New York. Later, he got involved in the main event between Rollins and John Cena, helping Rollins retain his WWE World Heavyweight Championship, as well as winning Cena's United States Championship when he interfered and hit Cena with a steel chair. The next night on Raw, he explained his actions, saying he did it for Ric Flair (who was also present), to guarantee he retain his world championship record. Cena then gave Stewart his finishing move, the Attitude Adjustment, to end the segment. Stewart returned at SummerSlam on August 21, 2016, as a special guest.

In 2016, Stewart joined President Barack Obama, Michelle Obama, Vice President Joe Biden, Jill Biden, and David Letterman in honoring military families on May 5 at Joint Base Andrews, Maryland. The special celebration which marked both the USO's 75th anniversary and the fifth anniversary of Joining Forces.

Stewart got into a Twitter argument with then-presidential candidate Donald Trump, who in multiple tweets stated that Stewart changing his name indicated that he was a fraud. Stewart and some analysts considered this to be anti-Semitic. Trump then tweeted that Stewart should be "proud of his heritage", and Stewart tweeted back, facetiously, that Trump's real name was "Fuckface Von Clownstick" and that Trump should be proud of the "Clownstick heritage".

In June 2017, Stewart spoke at the funeral service for Ray Pfeifer, an FDNY firefighter from Hicksville, New York, who died after an eight-year battle with cancer as a result of service as a first responder at the September 11 attacks.

== Influences ==
Stewart has said his influences include George Carlin, Lenny Bruce, Woody Allen, David Letterman, Steve Martin, and Richard Pryor.

Among comedians who say they were influenced by Stewart are Stephen Colbert, John Oliver, Hasan Minhaj, Samantha Bee, Larry Wilmore, Bassem Youssef, Seth Meyers, Trevor Noah, Desi Lydic, and Jordan Klepper.

== Politics and activism ==
=== Views ===
In 2000, when he was labeled a Democrat, Stewart generally agreed, but described his political affiliation as "more socialist or independent" than Democratic. Katrina vanden Heuvel for The Washington Post wrote in 2015 that Stewart is "one of the most important and influential voices on the progressive left...making progressive ideas sound like common sense." Stewart noted that his last vote for a Republican presidential nominee was in the 1988 presidential election when he voted for George H. W. Bush over Michael Dukakis. He described Bush as having "an integrity about him that I respected greatly." Stewart has said that during the 2020 Democratic Party presidential primaries, he was not a supporter of nominee Joe Biden, describing himself as more of a, "Sanders, Warren guy." He reluctantly supported Biden's candidacy in 2020, but has criticized him since then over his age, and his lack of condemnation of Israel's actions during the 2023 Gaza War. Stewart has been a vocal proponent of the United States implementing a single-payer healthcare system. In October 2025, Stewart publicly supported Zohran Mamdani, a democratic socialist politician who was running for mayor of New York City on a Democratic platform, during an interview with Mamdani in an episode of The Daily Show.

=== Criticism of television journalists ===
Stewart is known as an outspoken, humorous critic of personality-driven media shows, in particular, those of the American media cable networks such as CNN, Fox News, and MSNBC. Critics say Stewart benefits from a double standard: he critiques other news shows from the safe, removed position of his "news satire" desk; Stewart asserts that neither his show nor Comedy Central purport to be anything other than satire and comedy.

==== Crossfire appearance ====
In a televised exchange with then-CNN correspondent Tucker Carlson on Crossfire on October 15, 2004, Stewart criticized the state of television journalism and pleaded with the show's hosts to "stop hurting America", and he referred to both Carlson and co-host Paul Begala as "partisan hacks". When posted on the internet, this exchange became widely viewed and was a topic of much media discussion.

Despite being on the program to comment on current events, Stewart immediately shifted the discussion toward the show itself, asserting that Crossfire had failed in its responsibility to inform and educate viewers about politics as a serious topic. Stewart stated that the show engaged in partisan hackery instead of honest debate, and said that the hosts' assertion that Crossfire is a debate show is like "saying pro wrestling is a show about athletic competition". Carlson responded by accusing Stewart of hypocrisy, stating that Stewart's interview of John Kerry was primarily "softball" questions, though Stewart criticizes news organizations for not holding public officials accountable (Stewart had stated that he had voted for Kerry in the 2004 presidential election). Stewart responded that he didn't realize "the news organizations look to Comedy Central for their cues on integrity". When Carlson continued to press Stewart on the Kerry issue, Stewart said, "You're on CNN! The show that leads into me is puppets making crank phone calls! What is wrong with you?" In response to prods from Carlson, "Come on. Be funny." Stewart said, "No, I'm not going to be your monkey." Later in the show when Carlson jibed, "I do think you're more fun on your show", Stewart retorted, "You're as big a dick on your show as you are on any show." In response to Stewart's criticisms, Carlson said, "You need to get a job at a journalism school", to which Stewart responded, "You need to go to one!"

Stewart discussed the incident on The Daily Show the following Monday:

We decided to go to this place, Crossfire, which is a nuanced public policy analysis show ... named after the stray bullets that hit innocent bystanders in a gang fight. So I go to Crossfire and, let's face it, I was dehydrated, it's the Martin Lawrence defense ... and I had always in the past mentioned to friends and people that I meet on the street that I think that show ... um ... blows. So I thought it was only the right thing to do to go say it to them personally on their program, but here's the thing about confronting someone with that on their show: They're there! Uncomfortable! And they were very mad, because apparently, when you invite someone on a show called Crossfire and you express an opinion, they don't care for that ... I told them that I felt their show was hurting America and they came back at me pretty good, they said that I wasn't being funny. And I said to them, "I know that, but tomorrow I will go back to being funny, and your show will still blow."

In January 2005, CNN announced that it was canceling Crossfire. When asked about the cancellation, CNN's incoming president, Jonathan Klein, referred to Stewart's appearance on the show: "I think he made a good point about the noise level of these types of shows, which does nothing to illuminate the issues of the day."

On March 18, 2009, Carlson wrote a blog entry for The Daily Beast criticizing Stewart for his handling of the CNBC controversy (see below). Carlson discussed the CNN incident and claimed that Stewart remained backstage for at least "an hour" and "continued to lecture our staff", something Carlson described as, "one of the weirdest things I have ever seen".

==== Criticism of CNBC ====
Stewart again became a viral internet phenomenon following a March 4, 2009, The Daily Show sequence. CNBC canceled Rick Santelli's scheduled appearance on The Daily Show that day, so the show ran a short segment showing CNBC giving poor investment advice.

Subsequent media coverage of exchanges between Stewart and Jim Cramer, who had been featured heavily in the original segment, led to a highly anticipated face-to-face confrontation on The Daily Show. The episode received much media attention and became the second most-viewed episode of The Daily Show, trailing only the 2009 Inauguration Day episode. It had 2.3 million total viewers, and the next day, the show's website saw its highest day of traffic in 2009. Although Cramer acknowledged on the show that some of Stewart's criticisms of CNBC were valid and that the network could "do better", he later said on The Today Show that Stewart's criticism of the media was "naïve and misleading".

==== Criticism of Fox News ====
Throughout his tenure on The Daily Show, Stewart frequently accused Fox News of distorting the news to fit a conservative agenda, at one point ridiculing the network as "the meanest sorority in the world". In November 2009, Stewart called out Fox News for using some footage from a previous Tea Party rally during a report on a more recent rally, making the latter event appear more highly attended than it was. The show's anchor, Sean Hannity, apologized for the footage used the following night. A month later, Stewart criticized Fox & Friends cohost Gretchen Carlson – a former Miss America and a Stanford graduate – for claiming that she googled words such as "ignoramus" and "czar". Stewart said that Carlson was dumbing herself down for "an audience who sees intellect as an elitist flaw".

Stewart stepped up his criticism of Fox News in 2010; within five months, The Daily Show had 24 segments criticizing the Fox News coverage. Bill O'Reilly, host of the talk show The O'Reilly Factor on Fox News, countered that The Daily Show was a "key component of left-wing television" and that Stewart loved Fox News because the network was "not boring".

During an interview with Chris Wallace on June 19, 2011, Stewart called Wallace "insane" for saying that Stewart's earlier comparison of the marketing techniques of a Sarah Palin campaign video and an anti-herpes medicine ad was a political comment. Stewart also said Fox viewers are the "most consistently misinformed" viewers of political media. This comment was ranked by the fact-checking site, PolitiFact, as false, with conditions. Stewart later accepted his error.

In 2014, Stewart engaged in an extended call-out of Fox News, based on their coverage of food stamps and US government assistance, opining that said coverage was biased. This culminated in segments across multiple episodes, specifically singling out Sean Hannity and his show's coverage of the Bundy standoff. Hannity would "return fire" by calling out Stewart for associating himself with Cat Stevens during his Rally in 2010. Stewart responded to this by criticizing Hannity for frequently calling Ted Nugent a "friend and frequent guest" on his program and supporting Nugent's violent rhetoric toward Barack Obama and Hillary Clinton in 2007. In late August 2014, Stewart criticized the manner in which Fox News portrayed the events surrounding the shooting of teenager Michael Brown by police officer Darren Wilson in Ferguson, Missouri, and the subsequent protests from citizens.

=== 2007–2008 Writers Guild of America strike ===
Stewart was an important factor in the unionization of the Comedy Central writers. The Daily Show writers were the first of Comedy Central's writers to be able to join the guild, after which other shows followed.

Stewart supported the 2007–2008 Writers Guild of America strike. On The Daily Show episode just before the strike, he sarcastically commented about how Comedy Central had made available all episodes for free on their website, but without advertising, and said, "go support our advertisers". The show went on hiatus when the strike began, as did other late-night talk shows. Upon Stewart's return to the show on January 7, 2008, he refused to use the title, The Daily Show, stating that The Daily Show was the show made with all of the people responsible for the broadcast, including his writers. During the strike, he referred to his show as A Daily Show with Jon Stewart until the strike ended on February 13, 2008.

Stewart's choice to return to the air did bring criticism that he was undermining the writers of his show. Seth MacFarlane wrote an inside joke into an episode of Family Guy about this, causing Stewart to respond with an hour-long call in which he questioned how MacFarlane could consider himself the "moral arbiter" of Hollywood. Former Daily Show writer David Feldman also accused Stewart of being anti-union at the time and of punishing his writers for their decision to unionize by not using their material.

The Writers Guild Strike of 2007–2008 was also responsible for a notable mock feud between Stewart, Stephen Colbert, and Conan O'Brien in early 2008. Without writers to help fuel their banter, the three comedians concocted a crossover/rivalry to garner more viewers during the ratings slump. Colbert claimed that because of "the Colbert bump", he was responsible for Mike Huckabee's success in the 2008 presidential race. O'Brien claimed that he was responsible for Huckabee's success because not only had he mentioned Huckabee on his show, but also that he was responsible for Chuck Norris's success (Norris backed Huckabee). In response, Stewart claimed that he was responsible for the success of O'Brien since Stewart had featured him on The Jon Stewart Show, and in turn, the success of Huckabee. This resulted in a three-part comedic battle among the three pundits, with all three appearing on each other's shows. The feud ended on Late Night with Conan O'Brien with a mock brawl involving the three hosts.

=== 9/11 First Responders Bill ===
Stewart criticizes lawmakers for their inaction on the September 11 Victim Compensation Fund, in a speech on June 11, 2019.

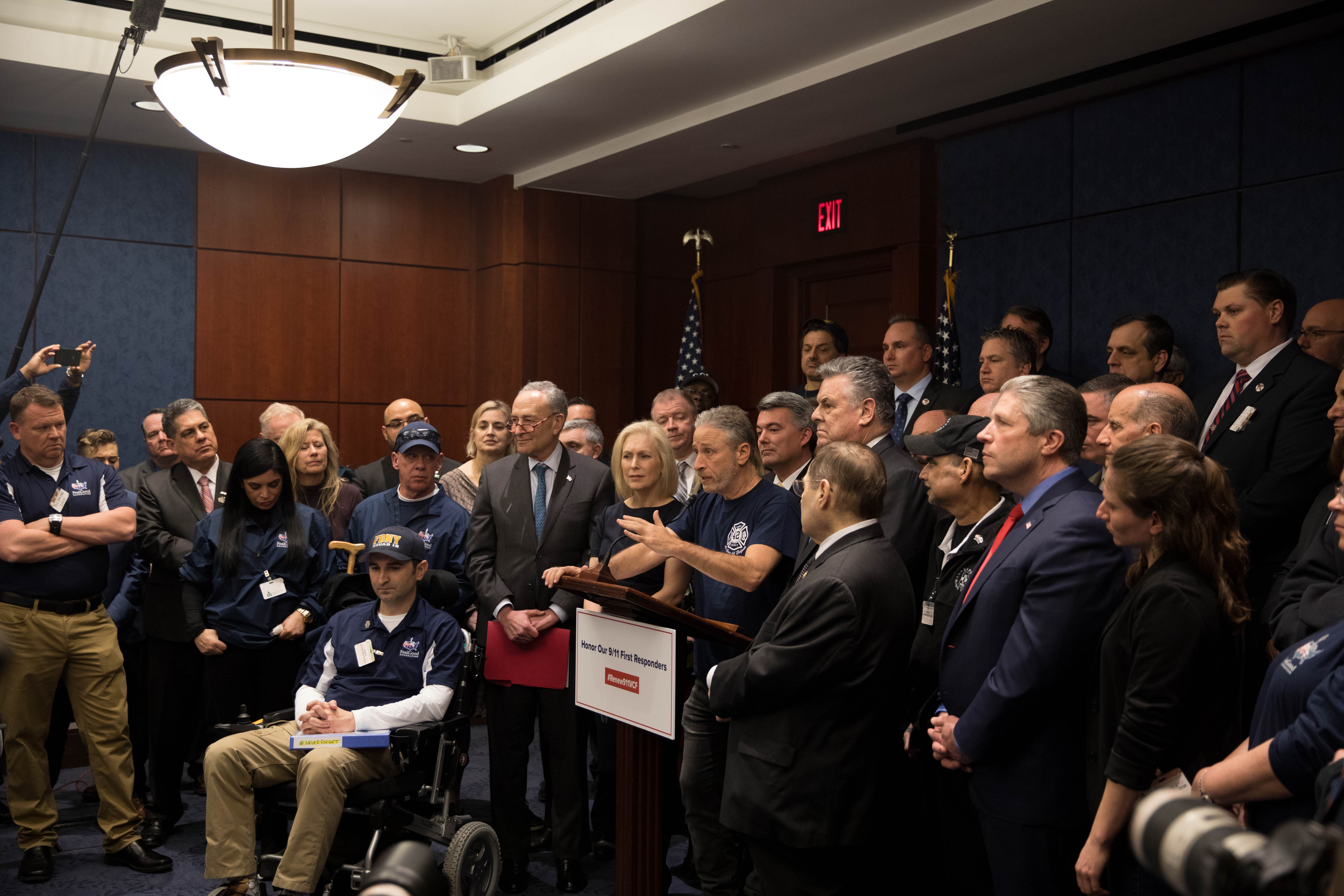
Stewart speaking at a press conference for the 9/11 first responders in 2019

Over the years, Stewart sometimes used The Daily Show to argue for causes such as the treatment of veterans and 9/11 first responders. He is credited with breaking a Senate deadlock over a bill to provide health care and benefits for 9/11 emergency workers; the bill passed three days after he featured a group of 9/11 responders on the show. In March 2009, he criticized a White House proposal to remove veterans from Veterans Administration rolls if they had private health insurance; the White House dropped the plan the next day. In 2010, Stewart held an interview with a panel of four of the 9/11 first responders—Kenny Specht with the FDNY, Chris Bowman NYPD, Ken George DOT, and John Devlin, Operating Engineer of Heavy Equipment—who discussed their health problems with Stewart. In 2015, four months after leaving The Daily Show, he returned to reunite the four with Specht as the only panelist healthy enough to attend. Devlin had died, and the two other panelists, Bowman and George, were too ill to make it to the show.

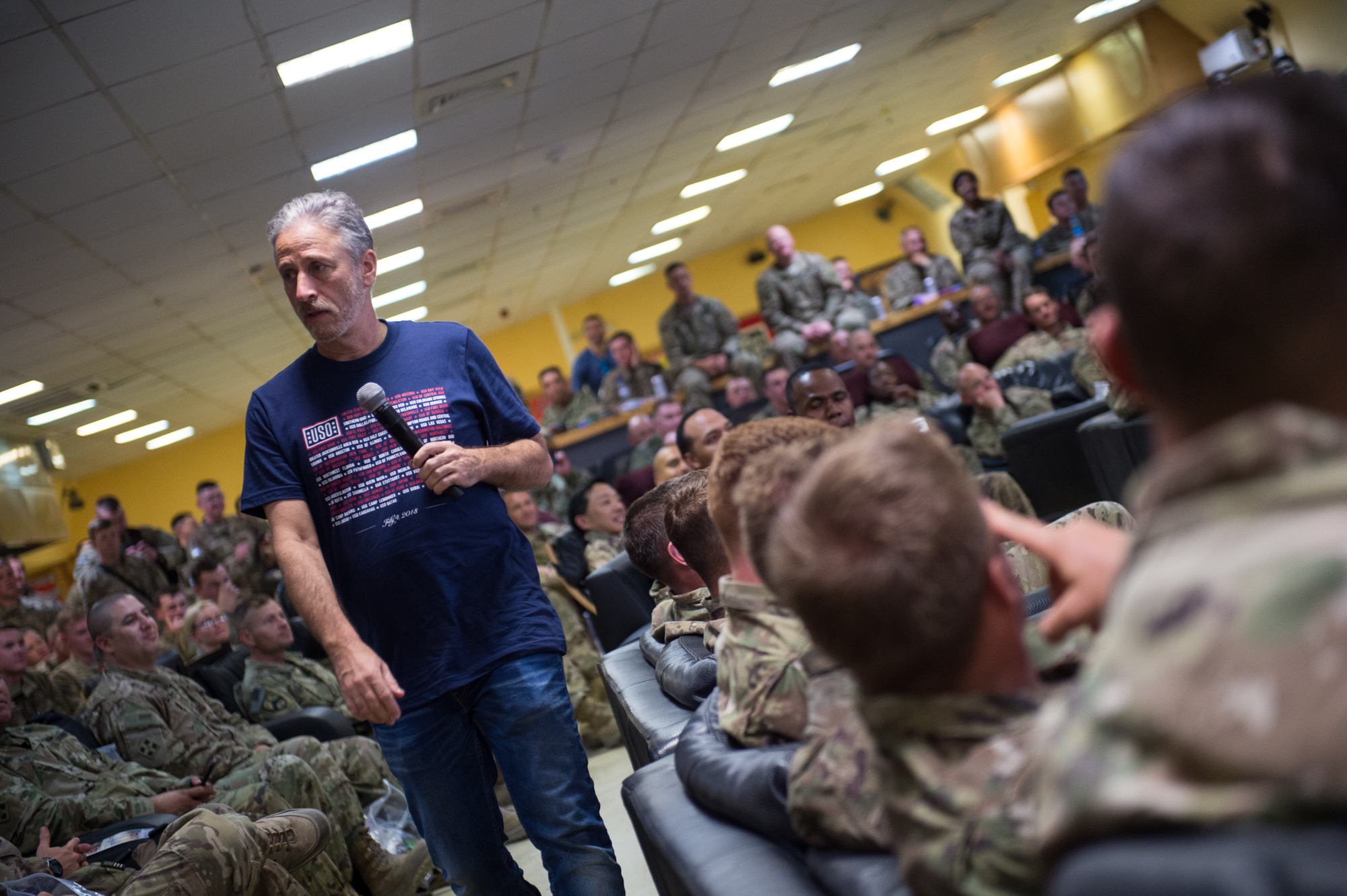
Stewart speaking to US Army soldiers at Kandahar Air Field, Afghanistan, in 2018

In February and June 2019, Stewart again went to Congress to oppose the $7.375 billion limit in pay-outs to 9/11 first responders through December 2020 and to lobby for permanent funding for the Victims Compensation Fund past December 2020, delivering a tearful testimony.

Sick and dying, they brought themselves down here to speak to no one. Shameful. It's an embarrassment to the country and it's a stain on this institution. And you should be ashamed of yourselves for those that aren't here. But you won't be because accountability doesn't appear to be something that occurs in this chamber...And I'm sorry if I sound angry and undiplomatic. But I'm angry, and you should be too, and they're all angry as well and they have every justification to be that way. There is not a person here, there is not an empty chair on that stage that didn't tweet out "Never Forget the heroes of 9/11. Never forget their bravery. Never forget what they did, what they gave to this country." Well, here they are. And where are they? And it would be one thing if their callous indifference and rank hypocrisy were benign, but it's not. Your indifference cost these men and women their most valuable commodity: time. It's the one thing they're running out of.

Stewart continued to be a vocal advocate, appearing on late night shows such as The Late Show with Stephen Colbert, The Daily Show with Trevor Noah, and news programs such as Fox News Sunday with Chris Wallace, and The Fox Report with Shepherd Smith. On July 12, 2019, the House approved the bill overwhelmingly 402–12. The bill came to the Senate floor, where it passed the 9/11 Victim Compensation Fund through 2092, virtually funding health care for 9/11 victims and first responders for life. The vote was 97–2 with Republican senators Rand Paul (KY) and Mike Lee (UT) opposing. When hearing that the bill had been passed, Stewart responded by saying, "It has been the honor of my life working with the 9/11 first responders...these families deserve better...and I will follow you wherever your next adventure shall be."

=== Honoring our PACT Act ===
On September 30, 2021, Stewart debuted his Apple TV+ show, The Problem with Jon Stewart by discussing the effects burn pits have had on veterans. Earlier in 2021, the bill Honoring our Promise to Address Comprehensive Toxics Act of 2021 (PACT Act) was introduced. The House of Representatives passed the bill by 256–174 on March 3, 2022, and passed the Senate by 84–14 on June 16, 2022. The bill was reintroduced to the Senate for minor changes which Republican senators including Pat Toomey, Ted Cruz, and Josh Hawley voted against, putting the bill in jeopardy. Their opposition was the unfounded claim that the bill could be used as a slush fund.

Stewart became a prominent advocate for the bill in person, on Twitter and on various cable news shows including Fox News' America's Newsroom with Bill Hemmer, CNN's The Lead with Jake Tapper, MSNBC's Morning Joe, and Newsmax. On July 28, 2022, Stewart held a press conference on Capitol Hill where he stated:

America's heroes, who fought in our wars, outside sweating their asses off...battling all kinds of ailments, while these motherfuckers sit in the air conditioning, walled off from any of it. They don't have to hear it, they don't have to see it. They don't have to understand that these are human beings.... I'm used to the lies, I'm used to the hypocrisy.... Senate is where accountability goes to die.... I'm used to all of it. But I am not used to cruelty.

On August 2, 2022, the PACT Act passed in a bipartisan measure, 84 to 11. Stewart was praised for lending his voice and celebrity to the issue and is credited as being an essential actor in getting the bill passed. Stewart stated after the bill's passing, that while it "feels good", it "shouldn't have been this hard". On August 10, the act was signed by President Joe Biden at a ceremony in the White House, where he praised Stewart for his commitment on this issue saying in part, "What you've done Jon, matters...It really, really matters. To refuse to let anybody forget, refuse to let them forget. And we owe you big, man. We owe you big."

=== Israel–Gaza war ===
Stewart has criticized Israel for its military and political conduct in the Palestinian territories. Stewart joined other media figures in signing Artists4Ceasefire, a 2023 open letter urging American president Joe Biden to call for a ceasefire in the ongoing Gaza war. He criticized Biden's handling of the war and reluctancy to condemn Israel's occupation of Palestine while having condemned Russia's invasion of Ukraine. Stewart has furthermore described the Israeli policy towards Palestinians as a genocide.

=== Apple and free speech ===
In April 2024, Stewart claimed that Apple restricted him from interviewing Lina Khan, the Chair of the Federal Trade Commission (FTC), on his podcast. This incident follows the U.S. Department of Justice lawsuit against Apple for alleged anti-competitive practices in the smartphone market. The lawsuit highlights potential harm to free speech due to Apple's dominance. Stewart's comments raise concerns about Apple's influence over content creation beyond its control of the mobile device market.

== Personal life ==
Stewart is nonreligious, but of Jewish heritage.

=== Marriage and family ===
A production assistant on Wishful Thinking arranged a 1995 blind date between Stewart and Tracey Lynn McShane. Stewart proposed to her through a personalized crossword puzzle created with the help of Will Shortz, crossword editor at The New York Times. Married in 2000, the two filed a joint name change application legally changing their surnames to "Stewart" on June 19, 2001. With the help of in vitro fertilization, the couple have two children. In 2015, he adopted a vegetarian diet for ethical reasons; he later adopted a vegan lifestyle. Tracey is a long-time vegan. He said the difference in how he feels "emotionally and physically is profound", adding "And I'm generally not comfortable with that – feeling so good – so it's hard for me not to go back to the old ways. I'm not accustomed to this euphoric sense of possibility. I much prefer the depression. The dark nights."

=== Animal sanctuary ===
In 2013, Stewart and his wife Tracey bought a 12-acre (4.9 ha) farm in Middletown, New Jersey, called "Bufflehead Farm". The Stewarts operate it as a sanctuary for abused animals. Four years later, they received approval to open a 45-acre (18 ha) animal sanctuary in Colts Neck, New Jersey, a home to animals saved from slaughterhouses and live markets. In 2016, the Stewarts rescued a slaughterhouse bull named Frank that got loose in a Brooklyn college, and took him to live at the Farm Sanctuary.

=== Interests ===
After leaving The Daily Show in 2015, Stewart took up playing the drums, saying it was partly to give his life the structure he no longer had without a daily late-night show to work on. He has since been taking drum lessons from New Jersey–based drum teacher Andy Bova, a former member of the indie-rock band No Wine For Kittens.

Stewart is a lifelong fan of the New York Mets and was in attendance when Johan Santana threw the first no-hitter in franchise history on June 1, 2012. Shortly before he left the Daily Show in 2015, a compilation of Stewart's jokes about the team during his time on the show was played. He is also a fan of the New York Knicks, New York Giants, and New York Rangers.

Stewart is a known fan of the musical group Beastie Boys. Following the death of member Adam "MCA" Yauch, Stewart dedicated his next Daily Show's Moment of Zen to the artist. Member Adam "Ad-Rock" Horowitz also later appeared on the show as a guest to promote his appearance in the A24 movie While We're Young. Stewart narrates a chapter written by Michael "Mike D" Diamond in the audio version of their biographical Beastie Boys Book.

== Filmography ==
=== Film ===
Year	Title	Role	Notes
1994	Mixed Nuts	Rollerblader	
1996	The First Wives Club	Elise's lover	Scenes deleted
1997	Wishful Thinking	Henry	
1998	Half Baked	Enhancement Smoker	
1998	The Faculty	Prof Edward Furlong	
1998	Playing by Heart	Trent	
1999	Big Daddy	Kevin Gerrity	
2000	The Office Party	Pizza Guy	Short film
2000	Committed	Party Guest	Uncredited cameo
2001	Jay and Silent Bob Strike Back	Reg Hartner	
2002	Death to Smoochy	Marion Frank Stokes	
2002	The Adventures of Tom Thumb and Thumbelina	Godfrey (voice)	
2006	Doogal	Zeebad (voice)	
2007	Evan Almighty	Himself	Cameo
2008	The Great Buck Howard	Himself	Cameo
2011	The Adjustment Bureau	Himself	Cameo
2011	The Beaver	Himself	Cameo
2014	Rosewater	None	Director, producer, and writer
2016	Batman v Superman: Dawn of Justice	Himself	Cameo, Ultimate Edition only
2020	Irresistible	None	Director, producer, and writer
2024	IF	Robot (voice)	

=== Television ===
Year	Title	Role	Notes
1990–1993	Short Attention Span Theater	Himself (host)	Various episodes
1992–1993	You Wrote It, You Watch It	Himself (host)	Various episodes
1993–1995	The Jon Stewart Show	Himself (host)	160 episodes; also creator, executive producer, and writer
1994	The State	Fanmail Guy	Episode: "2.4"
1995	1995 Billboard Music Awards	Himself (host)	TV special
1996	Where's Elvis This Week?	Himself (host)	5 episodes
1996	Jon Stewart: Unleavened	Himself	Stand-up special
1996–1997	The Larry Sanders Show	Himself	6 episodes
1997	The Nanny	Bobby	Episode: "Kissing Cousins"
1997	NewsRadio	Andrew	Episode: "Twins"
1997	Dr. Katz, Professional Therapist	Jon (voice)	Episode: "Guess Who"
1997	White House Correspondents' Dinner	Himself (host)	TV special
1997	Space Ghost Coast to Coast	Himself	Episode: "Mayonnaise"
1997	Mr. Show with Bob and David	Himself	Episode: "A White Man Set Them Free"
1998	Elmopalooza	Himself (host)	TV special
1998	Since You've Been Gone	Todd Zalinsky	TV movie
1999	Spin City	Parker	Episode: "Wall Street"
1999–2015, 2024–present	The Daily Show with Jon Stewart	Himself (host)	2,579 episodes; also executive producer and writer
2001	43rd Annual Grammy Awards	Himself (host)	TV special
2002	44th Annual Grammy Awards	Himself (host)	TV special
2002	Saturday Night Live	Himself (host)	Episode: "Jon Stewart/India.Arie"
2005–2014	The Colbert Report	None	1,447 episodes; co-creator and executive producer
2006	78th Academy Awards	Himself (host)	TV special
2006	American Dad!	Himself (voice)	Episode: "Irregarding Steve"
2007	Jack's Big Music Show	Brunk Stinegrouber	Episode: "Groundhog Day"
2008	The Simpsons	Himself (voice)	Episode: "E Pluribus Wiggum"
2008	80th Academy Awards	Himself (host)	TV special
2008	A Colbert Christmas: The Greatest Gift of All!	Himself	TV special
2009–2010	Important Things with Demetri Martin	None	17 episodes; executive producer
2010	The Rally to Restore Sanity and/or Fear	Himself (host)	TV special
2012	Robot Chicken	Matt Trakker, Serpentor (voice)	Episode: "Executed by the State"
2013	Big Time Rush	Himself	Episode: "Big Time Invasion"
2014	Phineas and Ferb	Mr. Random (voice)	Episode: "The Klimpaloon Ultimatum"
2014	Last Week Tonight with John Oliver	Himself	Episode "1.24", Cameo appearance
2015–2016	The Nightly Show with Larry Wilmore	None	259 episodes; creator and executive producer
2015	The Jim Gaffigan Show	Himself	Episode: "The Bible Story"
2015	Gravity Falls	Judge Kitty Meow Face-Shwartstein	Voice; Episode: "Weirdmageddon 2: Escape from Reality"
2015–2026	The Late Show with Stephen Colbert	Himself	Also executive producer
2021–2023	The Problem with Jon Stewart	Himself (host)	Also creator, executive producer, and writer
2021	Live in Front of a Studio Audience	Carl	Episode: "Diff'rent Strokes and The Facts of Life"
2021	No Responders Left Behind	Himself	Documentary film
2024	John Mulaney Presents: Everybody's in LA	Himself	Episode: "Palm Trees"

== Accolades and achievements ==
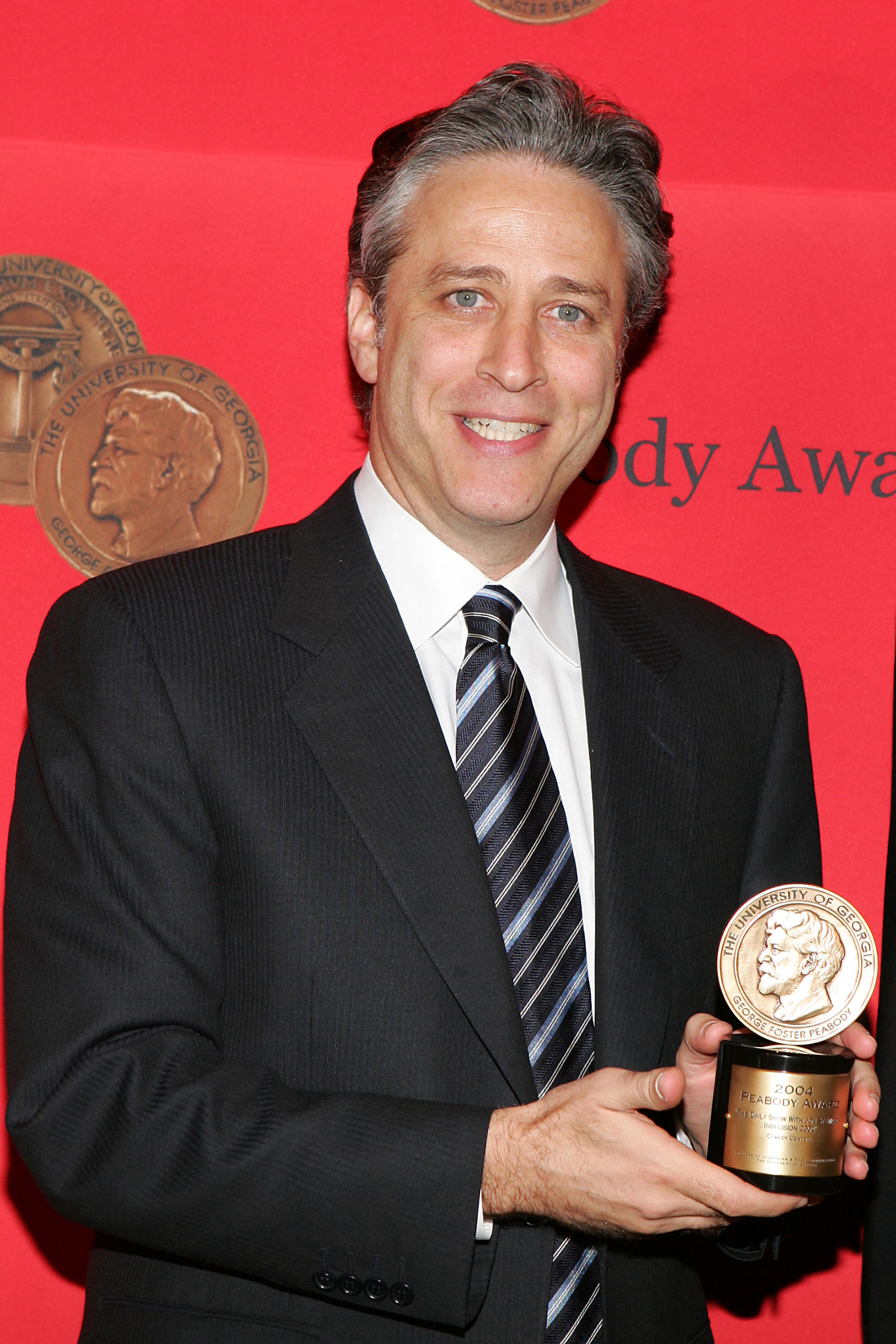
Stewart with the Peabody Award that he won with The Daily Show in 2005

Stewart and other members of The Daily Show have received three Peabody Awards for "Indecision 2000" and "Indecision 2004", covering the 2000 presidential election and the 2004 presidential election, respectively. He received his third Peabody in 2016 for his tenure at The Daily Show.

The Daily Show received the Primetime Emmy Award for Outstanding Writing for a Variety, Music, or Comedy Program in 2001, 2003, 2004, 2005, 2006, 2009, 2011, 2012, and 2015 and Outstanding Variety, Music, or Comedy Series for 10 consecutive years from 2003 to 2012. In 2013, the award for both categories instead went to The Daily Show spin-off The Colbert Report. In 2015, The Daily Show resurfaced, winning both categories for one last time for Stewart's swan song as host. Stewart won the Grammy Award for Best Comedy Album in 2005 for his recording, America (The Book): A Citizen's Guide to Democracy Inaction.

In the December 2003 New Year's edition of Newsweek, Stewart was named the "Who's Next?" person for 2004, with the magazine predicting that he would emerge as an absolute sensation in that year. (The magazine said they had been correct at the end of that year.) Stewart was named among the 2005 Time 100, an annual list of 100 of the most influential people of the year by Time magazine.

In 2004, Stewart spoke at the commencement ceremonies at his alma mater, William & Mary, and received an honorary Doctor of Arts degree. Stewart was the Class Day keynote speaker at Princeton University in 2004, and the 2008 Sacerdote Great Names speaker at Hamilton College. Stewart and The Daily Show received the 2005 National Council of Teachers of English (NCTE) George Orwell Award for Distinguished Contribution to Honesty and Clarity in Public Language. Stewart was presented an Honorary All-America Award by the National Soccer Coaches Association of America (NSCAA) in 2006. On April 21, 2009, President of Liberia Ellen Johnson Sirleaf made Stewart a chief. On October 26, 2010, Stewart was named the Most Influential Man of 2010 by AskMen.

For his advocacy on behalf of 9/11 victims and families, Stewart was one of eighteen individuals and organizations awarded the Bronze Medallion on December 16, 2019. The Bronze Medallion is the highest award conferred upon civilians by New York City. On April 24, 2022, Stewart was awarded the Mark Twain Prize for American Humor at the Kennedy Center in Washington, D.C., for his lifelong contribution to the world of comedy.

== Bibliography ==
- Naked Pictures of Famous People (Rob Weisbach Books, 1998). ISBN 0-688-17162-1.
- America (The Book): A Citizen's Guide to Democracy Inaction (Warner Books, September 2004). ISBN 0-446-53268-1.
- Earth (The Book): A Visitor's Guide to the Human Race (Grand Central Publishing, 2010). ISBN 978-0-446-57922-3.

== See also ==
- New Yorkers in journalism

Media offices
Preceded by Craig Kilborn	Host of The Daily Show; 1999–2015	Succeeded by Trevor Noah
Preceded by Trevor Noah	Host of The Daily Show (Weekly host); 2024-present Served alongside: The World's Fakest News Team	Incumbent
