= Where's Elvis This Week? =

- Starring: Jon Stewart; Mike McShane
- Countries of origin: United States; United Kingdom
- No. of episodes: 6

Production
- Producer: Sarah Smith
- Running time: 30 min

Original release
- Network: BBC2
- Release: 31 May – 10 November 1996

Where's Elvis This Week? was a weekly comedy talk show presented by Mike McShane in the pilot episode, and Jon Stewart for the remaining episodes, that aired on Sunday nights in the United Kingdom on BBC Two. It was filmed at the CBS Broadcast Center in New York City and featured a set of panellists—two from the United Kingdom, and two from the United States. The panellists discussed news items and cultural issues. It premiered in the United Kingdom on 31 May 1996, and six episodes aired in total.

== Episodes ==
No.	Presenter	Original release date	Guest(s)
1	Mike McShane	31 May 1996	TBA
2	Jon Stewart	6 October 1996	Eddie Izzard, Laurie Pike, Scott Capurro, Phill Jupitus
3	Jon Stewart	13 October 1996	Christopher Hitchens, Tony Hawks, Helen Gurley Brown, Dave Chappelle
4	Jon Stewart	20 October 1996	Lowri Turner, Felix Dexter, Joe Queenan, Norm Macdonald
5	Jon Stewart	3 November 1996	David Baddiel, Martin Clunes, Wendy Wasserstein, Ed Koch
6	Jon Stewart	10 November 1996	Arthur Smith, Armando Iannucci, Nora Ephron, Craig Kilborn
