= Busboy Productions =

Production company founded by Jon Stewart

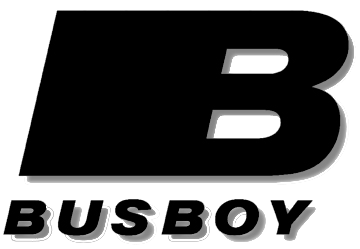
- Company type: Private
- Founded: 1998; 28 years ago
- Headquarters: New York, New York, U.S.
- Owner: Jon Stewart

Busboy Productions is a production company which was launched by Jon Stewart in the mid-1990s. He was known at the time for hosting The Jon Stewart Show on MTV. In addition to Stewart, executive Chris McShane is in charge of development and production.

== Name ==
The name of the company is a reference to when Stewart worked as a busboy in a Mexican restaurant as a young man. The company's vanity card features the sound of a glass being knocked over followed by Jon Stewart whispering "Oops. Sorry."

== History ==
Shortly after The Jon Stewart Show was canceled, Stewart signed a production deal with Miramax to star in at least two films per year and develop his own projects. However, Stewart starred in only three films for Miramax and no projects were ever produced. After Stewart's success as host and producer of The Daily Show, Busboy Productions was revived. In 2002, he approached NBC to create a show in which Stephen Colbert would star. That show never got off the ground.

In 2005, Busboy Productions reached an agreement with Comedy Central to finance the production company. Comedy Central has a first-look agreement of any project. If Comedy Central passes on a project, Busboy is then free to shop them to other networks. More recently, Busboy and Apple received a first look deal.

== Projects ==
=== The Colbert Report ===
Busboy's first television production was The Colbert Report, produced by Stewart, Stephen Colbert, and Ben Karlin, and subject to a distribution agreement between Busboy Productions and Comedy Central, which made certain that "the Report" would run through 2007. The Colbert Report was produced in association with Stephen Colbert's Spartina Productions.

When Jon Stewart was asked in an E! interview if he would appear on the Report, he joked that he "doesn't do start-ups" and would wait until the show set into a deeper footing. He has since made several appearances. Colbert's responded, "His shadow is dark enough. I don't want to ask the source of darkness for help. I'm not interested in that same liberal claptrap. That meow, meow, meow, ironic detachment. We're going to deal with truth on my show."

While The Colbert Report is Busboy Production's first successful television show, the notice "Copyright (c) 2004 by Busboy Productions, Inc. All Rights Reserved" appeared at the bottom of the "Shadow Government" poster included in The Daily Show's America (The Book).

=== Important Things with Demetri Martin ===
Busboy Productions also launched Important Things with Demetri Martin, a comedy show starring Demetri Martin, in which he "alternates between taped sketches and stand-up performances in front of a studio audience". Jon Stewart took an active role in "shepherding" the pilot. Reuters reports:

Lauren Corrao, executive vp original programming and development at Comedy Central, noted that Martin's style of humor is nothing like the sketch shows the network has previously tried. The pilot puts Martin's sly, thoughtful manner to use by having all the segments riff on "the important things" about... chairs. Future episodes will give the same treatment to everything from apples to "what happens after we die," she said.

=== The Naturalized ===
The Naturalized is a documentary film about immigrants from different countries seeking citizenship. It aired on History December 14, 2010.

=== Rumble 2012 ===
The official title is "O'Reilly v Stewart 2012: The Rumble in the Air-Conditioned Auditorium."

On October 6, 2012, Stewart and Bill O'Reilly met at the Lisner Auditorium at George Washington University in Washington, D.C. for a debate which was not broadcast on television but live-streamed. The promotion tagline was "It's why Al Gore invented the Internet." The show was marked by technical difficulties—many people were unable to access the live-stream—but was touted for being substantive. The event was a joint venture between Busboy and O'Reilly's Straight Talk. Web services were provided by Nox Solutions.

=== Sportsfan ===
Sportsfan is a documentary film which follows a group of Minnesota Vikings fans throughout the football season. It aired on SpikeTV in 2006.

=== Three Strikes ===
Three Strikes was the first scripted comedy pilot under Comedy Central's first look deal with Busboy. While a pilot episode was filmed, the series was not picked up by Comedy Central. The project was a character-based comedy set in the world of minor league baseball. It was written by Alex Gregory and Peter Huyck, whose credits include King of the Hill, Frasier, The Larry Sanders Show and the Late Show with David Letterman.

=== Rosewater ===
Rosewater is an American drama film written and directed by Stewart, based on the memoir Then They Came for Me by Maziar Bahari and Aimee Molloy.

=== The Nightly Show with Larry Wilmore ===
On May 9, 2014, it was announced that Larry Wilmore from The Daily Show was selected to host a late-night talk show on Comedy Central, to replace The Colbert Report after Stephen Colbert's departure from the network to host The Late Show with Stephen Colbert on CBS. The show is titled The Nightly Show with Larry Wilmore and is produced by Busboy Productions. It premiered on January 19, 2015, and ran Mondays through Thursdays at 11:30 PM (EST) after The Daily Show until its cancellation on August 18, 2016.

=== The Problem with Jon Stewart ===
The Problem with Jon Stewart is a late-night-style current affairs streaming television series hosted by Stewart on Apple TV+. Each episode is accompanied by a companion podcast (also produced by Busboy Productions) which includes further discussion on the episode's topic, featuring Stewart, his staff, and guests from the episode.

=== The Daily Show return ===
After the cancellation of the Apple TV+ show in October 2023, Stewart and Busboy returned to The Daily Show in early 2024, with Stewart presenting an episode a week. A video podcast The Weekly Show with Jon Stewart also launched in June 2024.
