= Important Things with Demetri Martin =

- Created by: Demetri Martin
- Starring: Demetri Martin
- Composer: Demetri Martin
- Country of origin: United States
- Original language: English
- No. of seasons: 2
- No. of episodes: 17

Production
- Executive producers: Demetri Martin; Jon Stewart; Beth McCarthy-Miller; Garris Stokes; Eric Slovin
- Running time: 21–23 minutes
- Production companies: Busboy Productions; PersonGlobal; Comedy Partners

Original release
- Network: Comedy Central
- Release: February 11, 2009 – April 15, 2010

Important Things with Demetri Martin was a sketch-variety show that aired on Comedy Central starring comedian Demetri Martin. Each episode examines a single theme, the "important thing", such as timing, power, control and money. All sketches, short vignettes, animated segments and stand-up comedy are loosely related to the theme of the episode. The show was produced by Jon Stewart's Busboy Productions, and contains stand-up, prop comedy and musical comedy by Martin, as well as taped sketches. Jon Stewart took an active role in editing the first few episodes. H. Jon Benjamin appeared in eight episodes and had a writing credit on seven as well.

== Recurring segments ==
In addition to Demetri's unconventional style of stand-up comedy, which he has performed for many years, there are several recurring segments on the show including:

Opening Act – In the opening of the show, Demetri Martin greets the audience and brings up the theme/topic of the show. This is followed with a short joke via flashcards. The card generally has play-buttons with a caption under them, which Demetri then reads and decides which one he will choose, usually "Jokes".

Good, Bad, Interesting – Demetri presents a good, a bad and an interesting reaction to topics based on everyday life situations.

This is... – Often used as a transition, this segment features a single humorous concept related to the show's topic in which one or more cast members will act out.

Important Things Things – An infomercial narrated by Demetri in which imaginary products related to the show's topic are advertised for sale. The products are often comically impractical or unnecessary like the "Burning-Hand Potholder" featured in the Strategy episode.

Demetrocles/Da Mici – In this segment, Demetri presents a humorous concept related to the show's topic as an ancient philosopher much like Socrates or Plato or an inventor like Da Vinci.

Other Jokes – This segment consists of other jokes about the topic that weren't included in the Opening Act.

New Expressions – In this segment Demetri is approached by a series of people that talk about different situations. Demetri responds to each person with an original saying/expression that applies to the situation.

== Episodes ==
=== Season 1 (2009) ===
No. overall	No. in season	Title	Original release date	Prod. code
1	1	"Timing"	February 11, 2009	101
Sketch: Rookie Cop; Sketch: A guy who is still way too early for a rave; Sketch: "What" Slam Poet Champion; Sketch: Jerry Pappas: Time Gigolo; Other Jokes about Timing; Dungeon Boys; Demonstration of Timing (music, drawing and jokes); Guest Star: Amanda Peet
2	2	"Power"	February 18, 2009	102
Jokes about Power; Sketch: Parking War (with guest star Jon Benjamin as the other driver); Sketch: A yellow belt opens a new pair of headphones; Sketch: A yellow belt prepares some boxes for recycling; Sketch: The Revenger (with guest star Jon Benjamin as the therapist); Other Jokes About Power; Sketch: A yellow belt fights depression; Music Situation: "Me vs. You"; Sketch/Animation: Creedocide; Sketch: Dungeon Boys 2; Sketch: Demetrocles (with guest star former Rockapella bass singer Barry Carl as the announcer); Sketch: "Hear" Folk Singer; Credit sequence: Trying to smash a car
3	3	"Brains"	February 25, 2009	103
Jokes about brains; Sketch: Dinner with Heroes (with Jon Benjamin as Benjamin Franklin and guest star John Oliver as William Shakespeare); Sketch: "What" Slam Poet Champion 2; Sketch: Dadz (New Dads) (with Jon Benjamin as the other dad); Some Data about Brains; Sketch: DaMici; Animation: Mountains vs. Wizard Looking at Mountains; Equations about Brains; Sketch: A genius & an idiot listening to smooth jazz; Sketch: When you donate your brain to science; Other Brains Jokes; Sketch: Fairly Important Fairy Tales: The Prince and the Pauper: Five Years Later (with guest star John Oliver as the Prince); Sketch: "Hear" Folk Singer; Sketch: Demetrocles 2; Credit sequence: A genius & an idiot at a monastery
4	4	"Chairs"	March 4, 2009	104
Jokes about Chairs; Sketch: Urinal Talk (with guest star David Cross as Demetri's co-worker); Sketch: A Yellow belt tries to relax in a beach chair; Large Pad: Sitting (Analysis); Sketch: Table 8; Sketch: A yellow belt fights gravity; Sketch: "Hear" Folk Singer; Sketch: Demetrocles; Sketch: Who Puts Gum Under a Chair?; Credit sequence: An audience member breaks a chair
5	5	"Safety"	March 11, 2009	105
Jokes about safety; Sketch: New Spring Haven Home for the Elderly; Sketch: An S&M couple whose safe word is: Bill Pullman (with guest star Jon Benjamin as the S&M man); Sketch: Pube-Safe; Sketch: Health Class - 1231 A.D.; Large Pad: Safety Analysis; Sketch: A guy with a neck brace (with guest star Jon Benjamin as another guy with a neck brace); Sketch: An S&M couple whose safe word is: the correct pronunciation of gnocchi; Important Things things; Sketch: "Hear" Folk Singer; Sketch: An S&M couple whose safe word is: heteronym; Sketch: Dr. Elliot Nussbaum - Physicist; More jokes about safety; Sketch: Fairly Important Fairy Tales: The Royal Food Taster (with guest star John Oliver as the King)
6	6	"Coolness"	March 18, 2009	106
Jokes about coolness; Sketch: Hoodwinkers (with guest star Jon Benjamin as one of the Hoodwinkers and Melissa Fumero as April); Sketch: Dadz (cool dadz) (with guest star Jon Benjamin as the other dad); Sketch: A DJ who gets up to pee in the middle of the night; Some data about coolness; Sketch: The Dragon Man (with guest star Jon Benjamin as the other dragon man); Sketch: "What" Slam Poet Champion; Important Things things; Sketch: Da Mici; Other jokes about coolness; Sketch: Dungeon Boys; Song: Cool Ways to Propose; Sketch: Da Mici; Sketch: A green beret vs. a yellow jacket; Coolness challenge; Credit sequence: Trying to be cool with a yo-yo
7	7	"Games"	March 25, 2009	107
Jokes about games; Sketch: Devon Cottenfield: Emotional Escape Artist (with guest star Ellie Kemper); Greater than or equal to; Sketch: The Annihilator; Another joke about games; Sketch: 2009 M Games (with guest stars Jon Benjamin, John Mulaney and Eric Drysdale as themselves); Sketch: A tiny guy at a country club; Sketch: A tiny guy on campus; Other games jokes; Sketch: Bird-Pranked; Sketch: Da Mici; Sketch: A tiny guy cheats at golf; Important Things things; Demonstration: Putting on socks and shoes using only my feet

=== Season 2 (2010) ===
No. overall	No. in season	Title	Original release date	Prod. code
8	1	"Attention"	February 4, 2010	201
Jokes about attention; Sketch: The Henchman (with guest star Alan Dale as the Evil Boss); Some data about attention; Sketch: Bruce the Funny Dog; Getting a girl's attention (with guest Levi Macdougall); This is: a guy who had a one night stand on Halloween; Good, Bad, Interesting; Song about forgetting someone's name; Important Things things; The Short Attention Span Library
9	2	"Ability"	February 11, 2010	202
Jokes about ability; Sketch: The Castaways; This is: a traffic wizard; Another joke about ability; Sketch: Giving birth on a plane; This is: a blind cowboy; Some data about ability; Sketch: Demetri's Notebook's Diary; "Hear" Folk Singer: Zombie vs. Dracula; More jokes about ability; Sketch: Demetrocles; Crazy Eyebrows (with guest Robert Newman); Talking to a girl; This is important: unicycles
10	3	"Strategy"	February 18, 2010	203
Jokes about strategy; Sketch: First Contact; Date at the movies; Good, Bad, Interesting; Sketch: Property Court; Song about strategy; Sketch: Second slice of pizza; Sketch: Sherlock Holmes - Victorian Bachelor; More jokes about strategy; Important Things things; This is: a retired general planning his day; Seduction strategies
11	4	"Money"	February 25, 2010	204
Jokes about money; Sketch: Robot 326 prototype (with special guest Fred Willard as the scientist); This is: a toll booth attendant at a strip club; Sketch: Loan shark cyclists, Part 1; Some data about money; Sketch: Pizza delivery; Sketch: Asshole Roommate from the Future; New expressions about money; Sketch: Loan Shark Cyclists, Part 2; This is: a creep at an ATM; A song about money
12	5	"2"	March 11, 2010	205
Jokes about 2; Sketch: Ladies Room; A song about 2; Sketch: Competing Uncles; Sketch: Déjà vu; Sketch: Robot and Talking Tools; Sketch: Max & Mintz - Two Straight Men; Song: Sames and Opposites Continued
13	6	"2 Part 2"	March 18, 2010	206
Re-show Pete; Jokes about 2; Animated sketch: The Adventures of Duperman; Sketch: The Job Interview; Animated sketch: The Adventures of Duperman; Drawing: Life Story; Animated sketch: The Adventures of Duperman; 2 Guests; The Forgotten Civil War: East vs. West; Pad: Doing 2 Things at Once
14	7	"Lines"	March 25, 2010	207
Jokes about Lines; Sketch: Search for the Skull of Lhasa; Drawing: Adding Lines; Sketch: Conference Call; Important Things things: Personal Finish Line; This is: a referee washing his car; Quotes (In Context); Demetri's Notebook's Diary; Song: Break-up Lines
15	8	"Nature"	April 1, 2010	208
Jokes about Nature; Sketch: Gayfoot; New Expressions about Nature; Sketch: The Naturalists; Sketch: Demetrocles; Good, Bad, Interesting; The Forbes 100 Richest Wild Animals; Demetri's Notebook's Diary; Song: Ruminations
16	9	"Space"	April 8, 2010	209
Jokes about Space; Sketch: Near death experience group; Drawing: Half-staff type flags; Sketch: Armrest; Word Spaces; Guys arguing with their girlfriends in beautiful places; Sketch: New warp speed; Sketch: Peterson's plan; Airplane sleep positions; Sketch: A cocky realtor; Constellations' shapes
17	10	"Control"	April 15, 2010	210
Jokes about Control; Sketch: Secret Agent James Steel; Sketch: Asshole Roommate from the Future; Good, Bad, Interesting; Sketch: Gobo and Human Treaty; New Expressions about Control; Sketch: Order Court; Sketch: Idol of Osar; Music Situation

== Reception ==
=== Ratings ===
The Comedy Central show premiered on Wednesday February 11, 2009 and attracted 2.4 million viewers, making it the best cable series show since Chappelle's Show drew 2.5 million views in 2003.

=== Critical reception ===
The show has received generally positive reviews from critics, and currently has a 71/100 rating on Metacritic, based on 8 reviews.

== Cancellation ==
During a comedy show at College Park, Maryland on October 28, 2010, Demetri Martin confirmed that Comedy Central had not picked up the show for a third season. The first season was released on DVD on September 8, 2009, while the second season was released September 14, 2010.
