= The Jon Stewart Show =

American late night talk show

- Genre: Talk show Variety show
- Created by: Jon Stewart
- Presented by: Jon Stewart
- Narrated by: Howard Feller
- Country of origin: United States
- Original language: English
- No. of seasons: 2
- No. of episodes: 160

Production
- Executive producers: Jeff Ross, Lorne Michaels, Jon Stewart, Barry Secunda
- Production locations: Chelsea Television Studios; New York, New York
- Running time: 30 minutes (MTV); 60 minutes (syndication)
- Production companies: Busboy Productions; MTV Productions; Paramount Domestic Television (1994–1995) (season 2)

Original release
- Network: MTV (1993–1994); Syndicated (1994–1995)
- Release: October 25, 1993 – June 23, 1995

The Jon Stewart Show is an American late night talk show that was hosted by comedian Jon Stewart. The program premiered on MTV in 1993 as a 30-minute daily offering and became one of the network's more popular shows.

Through a series of events that began with Arsenio Hall stepping down from his late-night talk show and the acquisition of Paramount Communications by Viacom, the parent company of MTV at the time, The Jon Stewart Show was retooled and launched in daily syndication for the 1994–1995 season as a 60-minute program with the first episode airing on September 12, 1994. It was canceled at the end of the season by distributor Paramount Domestic Television and aired its final episode on June 23, 1995.

== Guests ==
Celebrity guests who made appearances on the show included Howard Stern, David Letterman, Quentin Tarantino, Jonathan Brandis, Courteney Cox, Sherry Stringfield, Lorenzo Lamas, Bronson Pinchot, Conan O'Brien, Susan Lucci, Alicia Silverstone and William Shatner. The show was also popular for showcasing the type of musical guests that usually were not seen on other talk shows, such as Sinéad O'Connor, The Breeders, King's X, Quicksand, Blind Melon, Killing Joke, Buffalo Tom, The Figgs, Diamanda Galás, Megadeth, Van Halen, Extreme, Peter Murphy, Sunny Day Real Estate, Bad Religion, Naughty by Nature, White Zombie, Marilyn Manson, Redd Kross, Gin Blossoms, Dom Pachino, Faith No More, Rocket from the Crypt, Ol' Dirty Bastard, Belly, American Music Club, Fossil, Letters to Cleo, the Crash Test Dummies, "Weird Al" Yankovic, The Afghan Whigs, The Notorious B.I.G., Guided by Voices, Samiam, Warren Zevon, Mike Watt, Body Count, Danzig, Face to Face, Helmet, and Pop Will Eat Itself, as well as fringe sub-culture guests such as Rev. Ivan Stang of the Church of the SubGenius, and the Gloo Girls.

The show was produced by Madeleine Smithberg, the co-creator of The Daily Show.

One of the more memorable episodes, on June 22, 1995, featured a live performance by the American rock band Marilyn Manson of their songs "Lunchbox" and "Dope Hat" from their debut album 1994's Portrait of an American Family. The episode sparked nationwide controversy after their front man, Marilyn Manson, set a Bible ablaze onstage (which later was revealed to be a lunchbox), which elicited public outcry of blasphemy. The band finished their set by throwing instruments around the stage, and ended with a piggyback ride offstage on Jon Stewart. Stewart later recalled the episode in the book Angry Optimist: The Life and Times of Jon Stewart, "The next night, Marilyn Manson was on, and they ended up lighting the stage on fire. I really thought somebody was going to be killed that week."

The eleven members of (then-upcoming) MTV sketch show The State appeared as the last guests on the final episode of the first season of the show, and The State cast members received Stewart's permission to "trash" the set with various implements of destruction.

One night after the Marilyn Manson incident, David Letterman appeared in what was to be the final episode of the syndicated series. This was a rarity, as Letterman was not known to appear on many talk shows at the time as a guest. Before the show, Stewart had been told to "get (his) shit and get out" by the production company, and during the interview, Letterman advised Stewart "cancellation should not be confused with failure."
