= Naked Pictures of Famous People =

1998 book by Jon Stewart

Naked Pictures of Famous People: Another Example of Blatantly False Advertising
- Author: Jon Stewart
- Language: English
- Genre: Humor
- Published: 1998
- Publisher: Dey Street Books
- Publication place: United States
- Pages: 176
- ISBN: 978-0688171629
- OCLC: 49498832

Naked Pictures of Famous People: Another Example of Blatantly False Advertising is a collection of essays and short stories written in 1998 by Jon Stewart, who hosted The Daily Show. It was the first book Stewart wrote, followed by America (The Book), which he co-authored with The Daily Show staff. Naked Pictures was a national bestseller, known for its biting wit and political satire. It features several different formats for its chapters, from two-person dialogues to formal letters.

The chapters include:

- "Breakfast at Kennedy's" – A journal of a man's friendship with John F. Kennedy and the Kennedy family
- "A Very Hanson Christmas: 1996–1999" – Christmas newsletters from the Hanson family, which get increasingly disturbing as the boys become famous.
- "Lack of Power: The Ford Tapes" – Lost tape recordings from the Ford administration
- "Martha Stewart's Vagina" – A Martha Stewart show script, where she tells viewers how to furbish their vaginas.
- "The New Judaism" – Jon presents ideas to save a dying religion.
- "Pen Pals" – Letters from Princess Diana to Mother Teresa
- "Local News" – The death of the Taco Bell chihuahua
- "The Last Supper or the Dead Waiter" – The Last Supper from the point of view of a waiter
- "Da Vinci: The Lost Notebook" – Da Vinci's sketches describing unusual inventions
- "The Cult" – Jon imagining himself as a cult leader
- "Five Under Five" – Five notable youngsters under five years old
- "The Recipe" – A recipe for an awards show
- "The Devil and William Gates" – Bill Gates sells his soul to the devil.
- "Vincent and Theo on AOL" – Jon posing as Vincent van Gogh in an AOL chat room
- "Revenge is a Dish Best Served Cold" – A man who plots revenge at his high school reunion with the aid of a monster he created.
- "Adolf Hitler: The Larry King Interview" – An interview with an apologetic Adolf Hitler on Larry King Live
- "Lenny Bruce: The Making of a Sitcom" – A fictional sitcom by Lenny Bruce
- "Microsoft Word '98 Suggested Spelling and Usage" – A list of spell check suggestions Jon encountered while writing the book

Perhaps inspired by the title of the book, Stewart's collaboration with The Daily Show's team, America (The Book), actually included doctored "naked pictures" of the nine members of the Supreme Court.
