= Oprah with Meghan and Harry =

Interview of the Duke and Duchess of Sussex by Oprah Winfrey

- Genre: Television interview
- Presented by: Oprah Winfrey
- Starring: Meghan, Duchess of Sussex; Prince Harry, Duke of Sussex
- Country of origin: United States
- Original language: English

Production
- Executive producers: Tara Montgomery; Brian Piotrowicz; Terry Wood
- Production location: Santa Barbara County, California
- Running time: 85 minutes
- Production company: Harpo Productions

Original release
- Network: CBS
- Release: March 7, 2021

Oprah with Meghan and Harry is a 2021 television special hosted by American media personality Oprah Winfrey, that featured an interview between Winfrey, Meghan, Duchess of Sussex, and Prince Harry, Duke of Sussex. The special premiered March 7, 2021, on CBS in the United States, and in the United Kingdom the next day on ITV.

Filmed in Santa Barbara County, California, the interview came the year after Prince Harry and Meghan announced their decision to step down as working members of the British royal family in January 2020. The interview included discussion of their courtship, wedding, their second child's sex (female), mental health struggles including Meghan's suicidal thoughts, and a shared sense of abandonment in terms of emotional and financial support. Moreover, Meghan critiqued the British monarchy as an institution, while they both said one or more comments had been made privately to Harry by an unidentified individual within the royal family in relation to the skin color of their then-unborn son, Prince Archie. Also discussed was a royal title for Archie, the personal security of the couple, and Harry's estrangement from his father, Charles, and brother, William. Meghan's own relationship with her estranged family was also briefly touched upon.

The interview received high viewing figures, generated extensive media attention and mixed reaction from political figures. The special was nominated for a 2021 Television Critics Award, a Primetime Emmy Award, and a People's Choice Award.

== Background ==
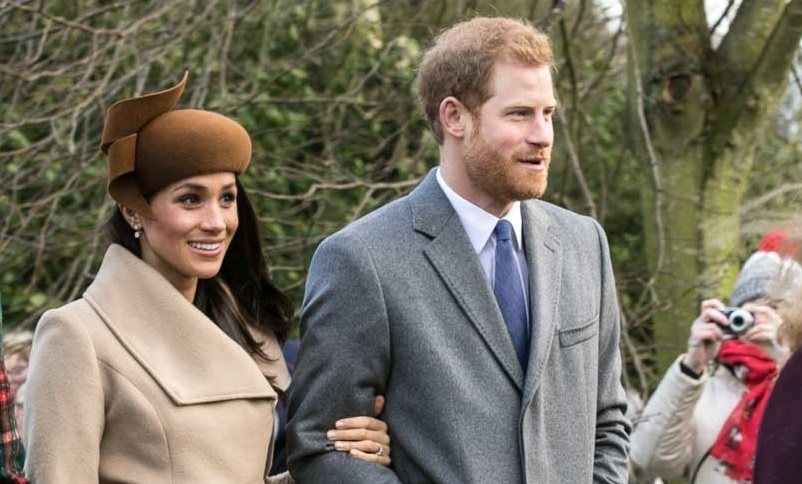
Meghan and Harry in 2017

Although Winfrey was a guest at the wedding of Prince Harry and Meghan Markle in 2018, the couple first discussed their experiences with the media and public life in the 2019 ITV documentary Harry and Meghan: An African Journey with Tom Bradby. In March 2020, Harry and Meghan stepped down as working members of the British royal family to move to North America and become financially independent, subject to a 12-month review period should they change their minds. In June 2020, a home was purchased in Montecito, California, within the same "super-wealthy" enclave as Winfrey and other Hollywood celebrities.

On February 19, 2021, Buckingham Palace confirmed that Harry and Meghan would not be returning as working members of the royal family, and that the duke would step down as honorary Captain General of the Royal Marines and relinquish all other honorary military appointments held. Both Harry and Meghan also relinquished their royal patronages, including the presidency and vice-presidency, respectively, of The Queen's Commonwealth Trust. On February 26, The Late Late Show with James Corden released a 17-minute film segment, titled An Afternoon with Prince Harry & James Corden, with Meghan making a cameo appearance by video call.

In March 2021, The Times reported that a complaint of workplace harassment had been made in 2018 against Meghan by her former senior royal advisor, after separate incidents with three other employees. Representatives of the duke and duchess denounced the reports as "misinformation" and stated that "it's no coincidence that distorted several-year-old accusations aimed at undermining The duchess are being briefed to the British media shortly before she and the duke are due to speak openly and honestly about their experience of recent years."

== Production and release ==
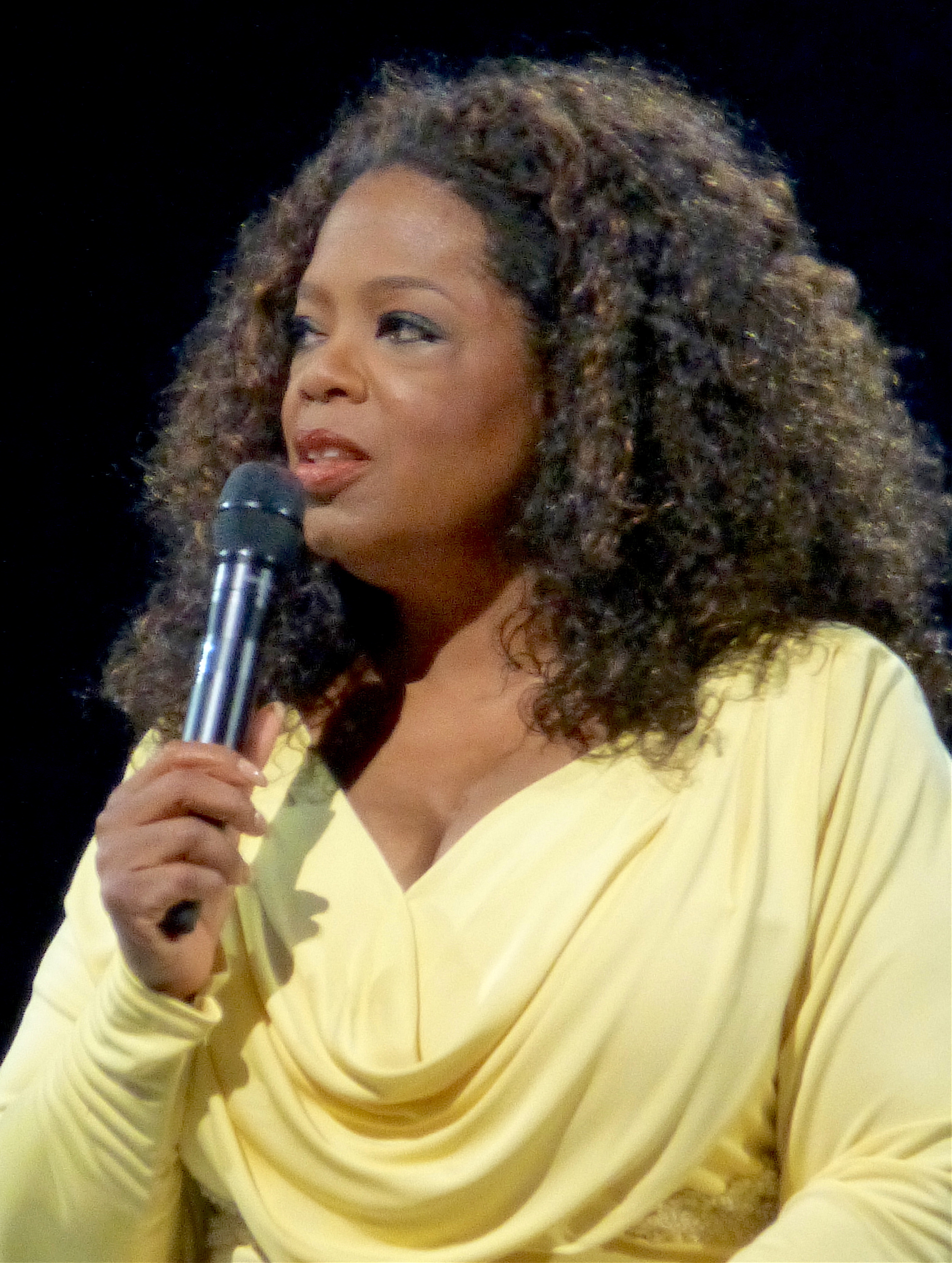
Oprah Winfrey in 2014

Winfrey initially denied reports of a "tell-all interview" in January 2020. Royal biographer Andrew Morton claimed that Harry had been in contact with Winfrey at least since November 2018. ITV News first reported that Meghan and Harry were finalizing an interview deal in February 2021, and it was subsequently confirmed by CBS. The Wall Street Journal reported that CBS paid "a license fee of between $7 million and $9 million" for the broadcasting rights. The network also sought $325,000 for 30 seconds of commercial advertising time during the broadcast. Meghan and Harry were not paid for the interview.

Produced by Winfrey's Harpo Productions, the taping took place outdoors in Santa Barbara County, California, at the home of an unnamed friend of Winfrey's. The special premiered on March 7, 2021, on CBS, and aired the following day on ITV in the United Kingdom. ViacomCBS Global Distribution handled distribution internationally. Winfrey appeared on CBS This Morning on March 8 to present footage not included in the special.

== Content ==
Various topics were discussed in the interview. Meghan spoke about "stepping into life as a royal, marriage, motherhood" and "how she is handling life under intense public pressure". She stated they were married in their backyard in the presence of the Archbishop of Canterbury three days prior to their public wedding ceremony. Harry joined her later, and the pair talked about their move to the United States from the United Kingdom in 2020 and their plans for the future, as well as revealing the sex of their second child, a daughter due to be born in "the summer" of 2021.

Meghan drew a distinction between the royal family, and those that run the institution of the monarchy: "It's hard for people to distinguish the two, because it's a family business right, there's the family, and then there's the people that are running the institution, those are two separate things ... the Queen, for example, has always been wonderful to me." She said "she phoned the Queen after Prince Philip went into hospital" in February 2021. Although Meghan said that she knew some things about the royal family, discussion of them was not regular when she was growing up. She commented on "naively" entering the royal family, as she did not do her own research because she felt that Harry was telling her all she needed to know. Meghan said that she was not provided with proper training on royal protocols, and recounted practicing how to curtsy with help from Sarah, Duchess of York, outside the Royal Lodge prior to first meeting the Queen. Meghan said that a reported incident of her making her sister-in-law Catherine, Duchess of Cambridge, cry was actually misreported, and that, in fact Catherine had made her cry about flower girl dresses. She stated that Catherine had apologized about it subsequently, sending her a note and flowers. Meghan also criticized the institution for knowing the truth about these events, but not showing any efforts to correct the story.

Otherwise, Meghan said that during her time as a senior royal, she had been silenced. She believed that, by not commenting on her life, she would receive protection, but said that such reciprocity did not occur. Meghan said that, when she was pregnant with her and Harry's son, Archie, she was told that the Palace would not give the baby the title of prince, nor would he receive personal security. She believed that this was attributable to her son's mixed ethnicity, and worried about a lack of security for him, particularly given the manner in which tabloids had treated her. She said that Harry had "in tandem the conversation" with a member of the royal family about not being a prince or having security and "concerns and conversations about how dark" Archie's skin would be. When later pressed for greater details, Harry said he is "never going to share more" about "that conversation" which took place "right at the beginning".

Meghan discussed contemplating suicide by saying "I did not want to be alive anymore". She said she had gone to several senior palace officials to seek help or be checked into a hospital, but was told that would not be good as a public image. She added that one of the people she reached out to during that period and has remained in contact with was a best friend of Harry's mother, Diana, Princess of Wales. Meghan discussed feeling trapped, telling Winfrey that her driver's license, passport, and credit cards had been taken from her prior to her wedding, and been made unavailable to her. Harry discussed the way in which Meghan was treated: "I saw history repeating itself," drawing comparisons to his late mother, and worried that a tragic ending may repeat itself with Meghan. Harry said that he only stepped back as a royal after it became clear that the help he was asking for was not forthcoming. He believed that after he and Meghan toured Australia in October 2018, members of the royal family were jealous of the "effortless" manner in which Meghan had been able to interact with people in the Commonwealth and "how good she was at the job". According to Meghan, they had discussed with the royal family moving to a Commonwealth country, particularly South Africa or New Zealand, as part of their stepping back.

Harry said that there was a period of unspecified duration in which his father, Prince Charles, would not return his phone calls, and he felt "really let down". Harry also expressed affection for his older brother Prince William, saying that he "loved him to bits", but stated, "we're on different paths".

Harry and Meghan denied having "blindsided" the Queen with their decision to step back as senior royals, and they also said that they had held discussions with the royal family beforehand. In response to Winfrey's question about whether he would have left the monarchy if not for Meghan, Harry said that he would not have. Meghan had opened his eyes as to how trapped he was inside the "institution" into which he had been born. Harry said that he and Meghan had not initially planned to make commercial deals like those which they had forged with Netflix and Spotify, but that they needed to make arrangements for their safety after the royal family refused them further security protection, then cut off financial support in early 2020. The couple later revealed that after royal security ceased, Tyler Perry provided them with a secure house in Beverly Hills until they were able to make an alternative plan. Harry added that he was able to provide for the family with inherited money from his mother. Harry and Meghan both said that they initially did not intend to completely leave their roles in the royal family, but only wanted to step back into smaller roles. At the conclusion of the interview, Harry declared that his relationship with Meghan had "saved" him, while she added that his decisions had saved their entire family, referring to the two of them and Archie.

=== Extra footage ===
Four clips that were unaired during the main program were shown the following day on CBS This Morning. When asked if racism played a role in their decision to leave the UK, Harry responded: "it was a large part of it". He also added that he did not believe that the UK is bigoted. Harry went on to say that after he informed the Palace about their decision to leave, the Queen canceled a pre-planned meeting with the couple in Sandringham due to a busy schedule. Harry's request for another meeting was denied over the phone directly by the Queen, though he attributed her decision to the influence of her advisors. The couple also talked about Meghan's tabloid coverage, and (according to them) an alleged toxic environment within the royal institution. Harry attributed this perceived toxicity to the "control and the fear by the UK tabloids", and opined that his ancestral family had adapted to such an environment.

Meghan added that what she experienced after she joined the royal family was different from the experience of her sister-in-law, Catherine, mainly because social media did not exist in its current form. She also spoke of the bad press coverage that the whole royal family had to deal with, but said that the bad press coverage which she herself had to deal with also had an element of racism. Additionally, Meghan talked about her conversation with her own father, Thomas Markle, in the days leading up to her wedding, mentioning that despite the fact that his relationship with the press could have been damaging to her reputation, he did not reveal his actions to her. She expressed sympathy for him because he was "hunted" by the press, but praised her mother Doria Ragland for being in the same situation but remaining "in silent dignity." She further stated that she barely knew her half-sister Samantha Markle, and questioned her credibility for writing a tell-all book. She added that her half-sister had changed her surname back to Markle only after realizing that she was dating Harry. In another clip released by O, The Oprah Magazine, Meghan talked about "a basic right to privacy". She acknowledged that, as public figures, they never asked for complete privacy, but it should be up to them to decide what parts they want to share with the public.

== Veracity and context of claims ==
=== Archie's title ===
As heir apparent to his father's Dukedom of Sussex, Earldom of Dumbarton, and Barony of Kilkeel, Archie was customarily entitled to use Prince Harry's senior subsidiary title Earl of Dumbarton as a courtesy. At the time of Archie's birth, it was reported that it had been Meghan and Harry's decision not to have him use a courtesy title, in accordance with their wish that he grow up as a private citizen.

A Royal Decree by King George V in 1917 limited the "prince" or "princess" titles to children of the British monarch, grandchildren in the male line, and the eldest son of the eldest son of the Prince of Wales. In 2012, the Queen issued letters patent for all of Prince William's children to be titled prince and princess (William being the elder son of the Prince of Wales at the time); the 1917 legislation had not anticipated her longevity. Since Archie was not also granted the title of Prince, Meghan mooted a future grievance that the rules set by the 1917 letters patent could be changed to "prevent" Archie from becoming a prince. However, according to Bob Morris from the Constitution Unit, this could be attributable to King Charles III's long standing idea of a slimmed-down royal family, the mechanism for which has not been announced yet. Finding Freedom author Omid Scobie later stated that Meghan "may have misinterpreted" the royal procedure regarding the issue, but added that there was "much more to this story" than is known to the public.

Following the accession of Charles III, Archie became entitled or eligible to use the title "prince" and style "royal highness" as the child of a son of the monarch, pursuant to letters patent issued by King George V in 1917. The royal family's official website continued to use the form 'Master Archie Mountbatten-Windsor' publicly until 8 March 2023. However, in March 2023 Buckingham Palace confirmed that the website would be updated to reflect his title of 'Prince' in due course, which happened on March 9, 2023.

=== Alleged lack of access to personal documents ===
Historian Robert Lacey explained that Meghan handing in her driver's license would have been a requirement under security rules, as she "would not be protected" if she went driving by herself. Royal commentators said that her passport would still have been used when she was traveling internationally – only the monarch does not use one – but that it would have been kept with other royals' personal documents in a safe and accessible place, which "really was routine, and probably anything would be accessible to her if she wanted it." Journalist Camilla Tominey called into question Meghan's claims about lack of access to her passport, pointing out that the duchess went on four foreign holidays in the six months after her wedding, went on official tours and enjoyed a lengthy honeymoon.

=== State-funded security ===
During the interview, Harry claimed that security protection and financial support had been cut off by the royal family in "the first quarter" of 2020, which ended in April when they were in Canada, despite there being no change in the level of threat to their safety. This apparently contradicted an initial agreement, based on which "the monarchy had previously advised" that Harry's father, Prince Charles, would continue to provide financial support for a period of one year. During a Clarence House briefing on finances preceding the annual Sovereign Grant report, a spokesperson stated that Charles had "allocated a substantial sum" to support the duke and duchess until the summer of 2020.

HM Treasury is the UK government department responsible for paying the costs associated with protecting members of the royal family. The Royal and VIP Executive Committee (RAVEC) is the body responsible for determining which royals and public figures should receive around the clock protection based on assessed security needs. Royals who do not have a leading role in representing the monarchy receive state-funded protection only when carrying out royal duties.

This arrangement aligned with that of other non-working royals, such as Princess Beatrice and Princess Eugenie, whose personal security has been privately-funded since 2011 after a review by the Scotland Yard. However, it was later revealed that their father, Prince Andrew, who has stepped back from public life due to connections with Jeffrey Epstein, was allowed to keep his £300,000-a-year security even after a recommendation by the Metropolitan Police to lower his level of security. Queen Elizabeth continued to pay for his protection using her income from the Privy Purse.

Once the couple left the UK for Canada, their security became the responsibility of the Canadian government. On February 27, 2020, after public backlash, the Canadian Minister of Public Safety issued a statement saying, in part, "As the duke and duchess are currently recognized as Internationally Protected Persons, Canada has an obligation to provide security assistance on an as-needed basis. At the request of the Metropolitan Police, the RCMP has been providing assistance to the Met since the arrival of the duke and duchess to Canada."

During their five-month stay on Vancouver Island, Harry and Meghan were protected by the Metropolitan Police and the Royal Canadian Mounted Police at a cost to Canadian taxpayers of over $90,000(CAD) in overtime and expenses: RCMP officers' salaries were not included in the figure. Between 2017 and 2020, Canadian taxpayers were billed more than $334,000 in overtime and expenses to protect Harry and his family.

=== Commercial deals ===
In the interview, Prince Harry stated that their commercial deals with Netflix and Spotify were "never part of the plan" and came into fruition on the suggestion of a third party to afford security costs after being cut off financially. The Daily Telegraph later reported that Meghan and Harry had held meetings surrounding "well-developed proposals" with the now-defunct streaming service Quibi a year before their departure from the royal family. The couple reportedly met with Jeffrey Katzenberg and other executives "throughout 2019", with alleged plans to "discuss [...] their own series of 10-minute videos". Andrew Morton, who wrote Diana, Princess of Wales's authorized 1992 biography and later published a book on Meghan, claimed that the Queen not only gave the couple the opportunity to choose which country they wanted to go to, but also suggested that Meghan could continue her acting career if she was not willing to carry out full time royal duties.

In July 2021, The Telegraph reported that Meghan had pitched an animated television show, Pearl, to Netflix in 2018. Representatives for Meghan responded that "any discussions with Netflix dating back to 2018 were exclusively about" Pearl and stated that it was among the "one-off creative advocacy projects" that had been "brought to her" as a royal.

=== Alleged comments about Archie's skin color ===
In the interview, Meghan relayed second hand (comments that had allegedly been said to Harry, not to her) that during her pregnancy there had been "concerns and conversations about how dark [Archie's] skin might be when he's born". In contrast to the suggestion of multiple conversations and comments, when asked about the same topic Harry stated it was a single instance at the beginning of their relationship: "That conversation, I'm never going to share. But at the time, it was awkward. I was a bit shocked. That was right at the beginning when she wasn't going to get security". Winfrey later stated that the comments were made by neither the Queen nor Prince Philip.

Author and socialite Lady Colin Campbell later said that the comments were made by Harry's aunt Princess Anne; however, there was a "misunderstanding" and according to different sources the conversation had been "twisted". Campbell stated that Anne's comments were on Meghan's "conduct and character" and "if the marriage proceeded and there were children, there would be huge problems" because of "Meghan's inability and determination to remain unable to appreciate the cultural differences, and to have respect for the institution into which she was going to marry". Journalist Christopher Andersen claimed in his 2021 book Brothers and Wives: Inside the Private Lives of William, Kate, Harry, and Meghan that the comments came from Prince Charles upon the announcement of his son's engagement, who "in a very kind of benign way" asked his wife Camilla, "What do you suppose their children's complexion might be?" Author and investigative journalist Tom Bower claimed in his book Revenge: Meghan, Harry and the war between the Windsors that the comments were made by Camilla, who jokingly told Harry "Wouldn't it be funny if your child had ginger Afro hair?" Sources close to Camilla described the allegations as "nonsense".

In his 2023 interview with Tom Bradby, Harry was questioned if he and Meghan had accused members of his family of racism during their 2021 interview with Winfrey, to which Harry responded "No. The British press said that, right? Did Meghan ever mention 'they're racists'?" He reiterated his earlier claims that "there was concern about his [son's] skin colour," but he would attribute it to "unconscious bias," which he said was different from racism. According to Victoria Ward in a piece for The Telegraph, sources claimed that the then Prince of Wales (now King Charles III) and the Duchess of Sussex exchanged letters after the interview, in which they both acknowledged that the remark was not made with malice and Meghan stated that she never intended to accuse the person who made the alleged "comment" of being a racist, but was raising concerns about unconscious bias.

In November 2023, the Dutch edition of Endgame, written by Omid Scobie, who had previously authored the couple's biography, was recalled after it erroneously included the names of two royals who were alleged to have asked questions about Harry and Meghan's future child's skin color. The two royals named in Scobie's book were reported by Piers Morgan to have been King Charles III and Catherine, Princess of Wales. An investigation was launched to determine how the names appeared in the Dutch version, as Scobie stated "I have never submitted a book that had their names in it." In 2026, Tom Bower refuted Scobie's claims in his book Betrayal: Power, Deceit and the Fight for the Future of the Royal Family and reiterated that the single conversation Harry referred to involved Charles and Camilla at Clarence House in 2016, and it was a light-hearted conversation until Meghan decided to weaponize it.

=== Private exchange of vows ===
Meghan said that they had in fact married three days before their public wedding, with a private exchange of vows on May 16 in front of the Archbishop of Canterbury. Harry supported this by commenting "Yeah, just the three of us". This earlier exchange of vows was not an official religious or legally recognized marriage, both of which require at least two witnesses. Later in March, a spokesperson for the couple confirmed that they merely exchanged "personal vows", and the private event was neither a "legal" nor "official" service. The couple's official marriage certificate also shows that they were married on May 19, with Harry's father and Meghan's mother as witnesses. The Archbishop of Canterbury also clarified their claim, stating "The legal wedding was on the Saturday [May 19]. I signed the wedding certificate, which is a legal document, and I would have committed a serious criminal offence if I signed it knowing it was false". As is customary for clergy, Archbishop Welby refrained from commenting on the nature of any private meetings with the couple, but added he "had a number of private and pastoral meetings with the duke and duchess before the wedding".

=== The Palace HR department ===
In the interview, Meghan stated that when suffering from mental health issues she tried to talk to senior palace officials, telling them she "needed to go somewhere to get help" but was told that she could not because "it wouldn't be good for the institution." She then claimed she sought help from the palace HR department, but she was refused as she was not a "paid employee of the institution". According to journalist Jonny Dymond "There's no HR department for working royals because it's a family affair", and HR managers are responsible for helping lower level royal staff and the household. Notwithstanding, seeking private therapy has precedent in the royal family and royal biographers questioned Meghan's claim of being turned away. In her own 1995 interview, Harry's mother, Diana, stated that she "received a great deal of treatment" after suffering from postpartum depression. In 2017, Harry himself acknowledged that he sought counselling years after his mother's death.

In his memoir Spare, Harry claims that following a physical altercation with his brother in 2019 he did not contact Meghan but immediately called his therapist. Journalist Daniel Bird pointed out the contradiction between Harry's claims in the book, and those he had made earlier about the lack of help for his wife: "Prince Harry said he called his therapist right after a fight with the Prince of Wales... but didn't Meghan say she wasn't allowed to speak to a therapist while she was a working royal? Seems odd Harry was allowed and she wasn't..." Pointing out Harry and Meghan's patronage of mental health charities and initiatives such as Heads Together and Shout, Emily Giffin wondered why they did not turn to one of these charities when they were allegedly denied help from the palace. In 2026, Harry revealed that he had undergone therapy just before Archie's birth to "cleanse myself of the past", indicating he had access to mental health services.

=== Flower girl dresses incident ===
Months after Meghan wed Harry, a widely reported story, damaging to her public image, was published in the British media that she had made her sister-in-law, Catherine, Duchess of Cambridge, cry in a dispute over flower girl dresses. In the interview, Meghan insisted that the actual incident had seen the opposite occur, with Catherine causing Meghan to cry. She added that "[Catherine] apologized, and she brought me flowers and a note apologizing", after which she "forgave" her, but sources close to the palace told The Times that Meghan had "slammed the door in Kate's face" when she took a bunch of flowers to Nottingham Cottage to apologize. Another source later told People that "both women were in tears over the incident". Andrew Morton claimed in the revised version of his book, Meghan: A Hollywood Princess, that Meghan had given Catherine and six of her friends gold bracelets following the royal wedding, a move that was described as "an elegant peace offering".

In a piece for Harper's Bazaar fashion magazine, Finding Freedom author Omid Scobie alleged that when Kensington Palace asked Harry to co-sign a statement to quash rumors of his brother William bullying Meghan and him, Meghan responded by email: "Well, if we're just throwing any statement out there now, then perhaps KP can finally set the record straight about me [not making Catherine cry]." Scobie said that Meghan's suggestion was ignored, with the palace saying that the Duchess of Cambridge cannot get involved in such gossip. However, in December 2018 a spokesperson for Kensington Palace denied rumors of a rift between the two women. In Finding Freedom, Scobie had previously said that, according to a source, "There were no tears from anyone. And in the end, the fitting was fine. Kate and Meghan were both a little stressed but professionals in the room". In March 2021, Camilla Tominey, the journalist who broke the story, stated that she still believed her original reporting to be true. In his 2022 unauthorized biography of Meghan and Harry titled Revenge: Meghan, Harry and the war between the Windsors, author and journalist Tom Bower alleged that Meghan and Catherine had a disagreement over the length of Princess Charlotte's hemline and whether the flower girls "should wear tights". Meghan then allegedly compared her friend Jessica Mulroney's daughter "favourably" against Charlotte, and Catherine, who was exhausted after having recently given birth to Prince Louis, burst into tears.

In his memoir Spare, Harry states there was a disagreement between Meghan and Catherine over flower girl dresses as Catherine felt her daughter Charlotte's dress needed to be completely remade four days before Harry and Meghan's wedding. Harry claims Catherine told Meghan via text that Charlotte had "cried" when she tried on the dress because it was "too big, long and baggy," before being reminded by Meghan, who had taken a day to respond, that she was dealing with her father, who was ill and not going to attend the wedding. Catherine agreed to take Charlotte to Meghan's tailor and Harry alleges that he found Meghan sobbing on the floor once he got home. Speaking to The Times, Ajay Mirpuri, the tailor brought in to fix the dresses, confirmed that they were a "mess" and his team worked for three consecutive days until 4am to make sure they were as good as possible for the wedding day. He added that if there was an argument between Meghan and Catherine he was not witness to it. In his memoir, Harry mentions Catherine meant no harm and claims that she visited them the day after the exchange with flowers and a card to make amends.

In a piece for The Telegraph, Camilla Tominey called out Harry for his claims in the memoir that the original story in the newspaper claimed "Meghan had reduced Kate to tears about the bridesmaids' dresses", adding that the article was a balanced 1,200-word feature that read: "The Telegraph has spoken to two separate sources who claim Kate was left in tears following a bridesmaids dress fitting for Princess Charlotte." She added that it was The Sun who ran with the headline "Meghan Made Kate Cry" with a piece written by Jack Royston, now Newsweek's chief royal correspondent. Tominey added that in contrast to Harry implying that it was only Catherine who complained about the dresses, members of the staff at the time were informed that Meghan had personally aired grievances about the ill-fitting dresses and other mothers were angry too. She also adds that Catherine went to personally meet with Meghan about the matter, and in a bid to help smooth things over it was Meghan who informed Catherine's staff that Catherine had "left in tears". In his book Yes, Ma'am: The Secret Life of Royal Servants, Tom Quinn quote a royal staff member who claimed "all the papers and commentators got this wrong" and "Meghan said a few things she regretted and Kate said a few things she later regretted, but it was all in the heat of the moment. Both women were crying their eyes out!"

=== Montage featuring headlines ===
On March 12, lawyers for Associated Newspapers wrote a letter to ViacomCBS demanding a retraction of a montage shown in the special "that purported to feature headlines from British newspapers". Among examples given were an image broadcast containing the Daily Mail headline "Meghan's seed will taint our Royal Family", which the company stated was an edited version of the original, which reported the suspension of a UKIP politician over racist texts. Representatives argued that the headlines were either doctored or taken out of context to present a "misleading" display. A third of the headlines were from gossip magazines published in Australia or the US, not the UK.

Among the featured headlines that according to Winfrey "left [Meghan] with no option but to quit" was a column by Michael Deacon titled "The real problem with Meghan Markle: she just doesn't speak our language", which was in fact published in December 2020, eleven months after the couple decided to leave the UK, and was about her use of "hippie corporate management speak". Harpo Productions later released a statement in response, saying: "Prince Harry and Meghan, the Duke and Duchess of Sussex, shared in the interview their personal story. We stand by the broadcast in its entirety." ITV later said that it would edit out some of the misleading headlines.

=== Claim of being financially cut off by the royal family ===
In the interview, Harry claimed that "members of my family were suggesting that [Meghan] carries on acting, because there was not enough money to pay for her, and all this sort of stuff." Royal biographer Andrew Morton claimed the royal family's motives were benign: "They did say to Meghan, 'If you don't want to embrace royal duties full time, please be our guest and continue your acting career.' Those opportunities were open to her."

Meghan and Harry also claimed in the interview that they were financially cut off by the royal family, with Harry saying that the royal family had, "literally cut me off financially". In June 2021, accompanying the royal family's annual financial report on its financial activities under the Sovereign Grant, Clarence House, Prince Charles's residence, released an additional statement revealing that he had provided financial support to Meghan and Harry as they were departing the royal family. The statement claimed that Charles had provided them a "substantial sum" to support their transition out of the royal family. The statement also noted that such financial support ceased in the summer of 2020. Some media outlets argued that this meant that the assertion in the interview had been false. However, other sources argued that their claim had not been false, since financial support, according to Clarence House's statement, had ceased during the summer of 2020, and Harry and Meghan had, themselves, per the royal family's financial report, repaid the royal family $3.3 million in reimbursement for renovations to Frogmore Cottage.

A spokesperson for Meghan and Harry stated in June 2021, "The Duke's comments during the Oprah interview were in reference to the first quarter of the fiscal reporting period in the U.K., which starts annually in April. This is the same date that the 'transitional year' of the Sandringham agreement began and is aligned with the timeline that Clarence House referenced."

=== Claims about lack of training on royal etiquette ===
During the interview, Meghan claimed that "there's no class on how to speak, how to cross your legs, how to be royal," and added that it might have existed for other members but not offered to her. In response to the claims, a former member of her staff told CNN, "They bent over backwards as far as I could see. I think there was complete hospitality and kindness and grace." Another royal source added, "Everyone wanted to make it a success. The Queen's senior team were directed to avail themselves to ensure she had all the support needed." It was also reported that the Queen had personally instructed her aides, including her lady-in-waiting Lady Susan Hussey, and her dresser Angela Kelly, to assist Meghan and offer her advice at Kensington Palace, which was described as "an unprecedented gesture of support" for a new member of the royal family.

== Reception ==
There was a wide and polarized global reaction to the interview. The reaction was varied across different countries with more sympathy for the Queen and Royal Family in the UK, whereas in the US sympathy lay mostly with Harry and Meghan. On September 9, 2021, a clip of the Oprah interview was shown at the British 26th National Television Awards, and "the audience reportedly started booing when Harry and Meghan appeared on-screen." The special was also nominated for an American Emmy Award and a 2021 Television Critics Award. In December 2021, Vogue named the interview among "The 10 Best Pop-Culture Moments of 2021". It also became the most searched interview in Google Trends history.

=== In the media ===
Prior to the broadcast of the interview, American television network NBC wrote of "daily episodes of royal drama in the shape of leaks, counterstatements and well-timed preview clips", which "may have been designed to build tension ahead of the interview". However, a CNN analysis following the broadcast noted that, despite the preview clips generating attention in the week ahead of the broadcast, "[Winfrey]'s team ensured that nothing leaked" in regards to the biggest claims in the interview, resulting in "maximum shock value". On the day of the U.S. broadcast, comment was made in British newspaper The Observer that "in the United States, anglophiles and amateur royal watchers are simply sitting back and lapping up the show."

Linda Holmes of NPR stated that the special was "painful and personal and unsparing about the cost of all this to Meghan particularly, and it was not anything the royal family would be excited to have people hear." The Hollywood Reporter wrote that the garden setting and Meghan's wardrobe "endow[ed] the two-hour interview with a kind of California casualness that belied the many upsetting and emotional revelations to follow." The publication also said it was "shocking how relatively open Harry was about his family". The Economist wrote that the interview's revelations "echoed Princess Diana's experience" and "also represents a burning of bridges." Talking to the BBC, Katie Nicholl argued that "Meghan isn't followed or chased by the paparazzi in the way Diana was", and added "I think Meghan has come under just as much scrutiny as any other member of the Royal family". She believed it was normal for the press to report on the royal family, "but it has to be fair and has to be impartial". In his report for CNN, Max Foster outlined "inconsistencies" in the interview, including the couple's decision to be interviewed by a well-established journalist on a major network which was in contrast to their initial pledge to engage with "grassroots media organizations and young, up-and-coming journalists", as well as Meghan's claim of getting married three days before her and Harry's wedding despite the marriage license showing May 19 (date of the wedding) as the official date of legal marriage.

Rachel Brodsky of the London Independent wrote: "[T]he couple may never be free from the tabloids' monster grip. But at least, as Harry and Meghan have compellingly shown in their first real foray into taking back their narrative, they can be part of the conversation. And that is their choice to make." Writing for the same paper, Jamie Williams argued that the truth behind the couple's motives for emigrating lay somewhere between escaping the toxic treatment of Meghan by the British press and their desire to live a glamorous celebrity lifestyle, but he added that, nevertheless, "Meghan and Harry had the potential to become Britain's greatest branded asset as the decade unfolded, and for whatever reason, we, or they, or perhaps all of us, have screwed it up. Royally." In the lead sentence in Time, Candy Lang wrote, "There was one clear thread throughout Meghan Markle and Prince Harry's dynamic interview with Oprah Winfrey on Sunday night: They believe they were driven from the royal family because of racism".

Jonny Dymond of BBC wrote that the great contradictions due to "the merging of personal and public roles" within the family was the main factor which prompted the couple to leave. He wrote that the interview could be "a catalyst for change", but added that "the Crown has been around for a very long time, and change does not come easily to a body in which the past plays such an outsize role". Anita Singh from The Daily Telegraph cited the interview as "a mix of straight-from-the-heart and stagey" and wrote that it "was really the Meghan and Oprah show, and the two women complemented each other perfectly." Writing for the same paper, historian Andrew Roberts believed the couple "took the deliberate decision to damage the institution of the monarchy as much as they possibly could on the way out", and added "if the monarchy really is a sinister racist institution, Harry and Meghan ought to resign their HRH titles and the Duchy of Sussex forthwith".

Allison Pearson from The Daily Telegraph also criticized the interview and the couple's attitude, saying "The only truthful lens is their own. Anyone who comes up with facts which contradict their feelings is either frightened of the tabloids, trapped or racist – quite possibly all three". She also believed that Winfrey's lack of knowledge on the UK and its royal family made her unable to query the couple's unclear answers. Lucy Mangan of The Guardian, however, praised Winfrey for her "patented blend of warmth, empathy and persistence [that] makes her still the best in the business" and wrote that Winfrey's reaction of "disbelief" toward comments made about Archie's skin spoke "to a fascinating level of general ignorance [...] in the way the English aristocracy operates." Writing for The Observer, Barbara Ellen was critical of the interview, stating "In this sprawling "nothing off-limits" interview, where were the questions the couple didn't want to answer? [...] as race featured, why wasn't Harry directly grilled about the well-documented dismaying episodes of his youth, if only to give him the opportunity to show how far he'd come?" She also doubted that the couple would be able to form a close relationship with the American upper class, most of whom "are unlikely to feel true kinship with people who give explosive gut-spilling interviews, never mind leak private family conversations to showbiz journalists". Russell Myers, Daily Mirror's royal editor, called into question Meghan's claim regarding the Palace throwing "holiday parties" for the tabloids, stating he "never got a ticket".

On March 10, 2021, Ian Murray, the executive editor of the Society of Editors, was interviewed by Victoria Derbyshire on BBC News. Contradicting claims made by Prince Harry during the interview, Murray said, "the UK media is not bigoted and will not be swayed from its vital role holding the rich and powerful to account". In response to this, several news organizations withdrew from the society's Press Awards, as did ITV presenter Charlene White, who was due to host the event. Over 160 journalists also issued statements, disagreeing with Murray's claims. Murray resigned the following day. The Bureau of Investigative Journalism stated the society's "statement denying bigotry and racism in the UK media shows a lack of awareness and understanding of deep-rooted and persistent problems that we see".

The Washington Post assessed the British media as reacting "in horror" to the interview. British tabloids, whose practices were heavily criticized in the interview, were particularly negative in their coverage of the interview. The United States media reacted generally favorably and sympathetically towards the interview. However, many conservative media outlets in the United States reacted negatively to the interview, and were defensive of the monarchy.

==== Piers Morgan remarks ====
On the March 8, 2021 edition of UK network ITV's morning show Good Morning Britain after the interview's U.S. airing, anchor Piers Morgan disputed the veracity of Meghan's contemplation of suicide, stating "I don't believe a word she says. [...] I wouldn't believe her if she read me a weather report." Morgan's remarks were met with immediate backlash from viewers and other critics; broadcasting and telecom regulator Ofcom received over 41,000 complaints over the program. British mental health charity Mind (which is a partner of a charity campaign with ITV's Britain's Got Talent) expressed "disappointment" in the remarks, stating that mental health issues should be "treated with dignity, respect and empathy."

On Good Morning Britain the following morning, Morgan distanced himself from his previous comments, stating that "if someone is feeling that way they should get the treatment and the help that they need every time. Every time. And if they belong to an institution like the royal family they should seek that help and be given it. It's not for me to question if she felt suicidal; I am not in her mind and that is for her to say." During the program, co-anchor Alex Beresford also criticized Morgan for his repeated on-air criticism of Meghan; "She's entitled to cut you off if she wants to. Has she said anything about you since she cut you off? I don't think she has but yet you continue to trash her." In response to the comment, Morgan walked off the set; Beresford apologized to viewers, arguing that Morgan "spouts off on a regular basis" and "has the ability to talk from a position where he doesn't fully understand".

Later that day, Ofcom announced that it would investigate the March 8 Good Morning Britain for violations of its Broadcasting Code. Shortly afterward, ITV announced that Morgan would leave Good Morning Britain effective immediately. ITV News later reported the Duchess had complained directly to ITV's CEO about Morgan's comments about mental health, although the broadcaster was not officially commenting on these reports. Meghan also complained to Ofcom about Morgan's comments. Her staff also reportedly emailed the BBC about their Today programme, and referring to the four commentators brought to discuss the interview, warned the corporation that having "three middle-aged white men discussing issues of race" was not ideal. The BBC responded by saying that they could not confirm or deny whether they had been contacted by an PRs, but added that they "had a broad range of voices on [their] output and don't believe there are any issues".

In response to the backlash, Morgan issued a statement on Twitter on March 10, saying, "On Monday, I said I didn't believe Meghan Markle in her Oprah interview. I've had time to reflect on this opinion, and I still don't. Freedom of speech is a hill I'm happy to die on." He later stated, "I think the damage she's done to the British monarchy and to the Queen at a time when Prince Philip is lying in hospital is enormous and frankly contemptible." On March 17, it was revealed that complaints against Morgan had reached 57,000, breaking Ofcom's record. Morgan remained defiant, stating "Only 57,000? I've had more people than that come up and congratulate me in the street for what I said. The vast majority of Britons are right behind me." Ofcom cleared ITV of any wrongdoing in September 2021 and added that restricting Morgan's views would be a "chilling restriction" on freedom of speech but criticized his "apparent disregard" for the subject of suicide. Morgan described the ruling as "a resounding victory for free speech and a resounding defeat for Princess Pinocchios."

=== Political reaction ===
UK prime minister Boris Johnson declined to comment when asked if he believed the royal family was racist, saying "when it comes to matters to do with the Royal Family, the right thing for prime ministers to say is nothing". The UK Minister of State for Foreign Affairs Zac Goldsmith criticized Harry on Twitter and said, "Harry is blowing up his family. 'What Meghan wants, Meghan gets.'" UK opposition leader Keir Starmer said that Meghan's allegations about racism and a lack of mental health support should be taken "very, very seriously". Shadow education secretary Kate Green said the allegations were "really distressing" and "shocking". Labour MP and former shadow home secretary Diane Abbott said she could cite "story after story when Meghan was treated quite differently from white members of the Royal Family". She also believed that with opening up about her mental health issues, Meghan could encourage black and mixed-race women to talk about their issues and vulnerabilities. After enquiries about a debate in the House of Commons in response to the couple's interview, Holly Lynch, who was the organizer of an open letter of support by 72 female MPs to the Duchess in 2019, said she and the other MPs who penned the letter were considering what necessary steps should be taken to prevent the "hounding" of high-profile women such as Meghan by the press.

In the UK and elsewhere, there were also calls for the abolition of the monarchy. "The monarchy has just been hit by its worst crisis since the abdication in 1936. Whether for the sake of Britain or for the sake of the younger royals this rotten institution needs to go", said Graham Smith, CEO of Republic, whilst Ken Ritchie of Labour for a Republic claimed the interview was evidence that the royal family were "no better" than the public. Ritchie said "The monarchy has always thrived on an air of mystery that just cannot be maintained in this age of the media," adding, "It is simply more likely that things like this are going to come out." The New York Times published an op-ed, "Down With the British Monarchy", in which Hamilton Nolan said "You cannot turn a bottle of poison into a refreshing drink, no matter how much sugar you pour into it."

Australian prime minister Scott Morrison commented: "My personal position, I have always supported the constitutional monarchy." Conversely, Morrison's predecessor (and chair of the Australian Republican Movement from 1993 to 2000) Malcolm Turnbull argued that the interview strengthened the case for Australia becoming a republic by ending the monarchy of Australia. Meanwhile, when asked to comment following the interview, prime minister of New Zealand Jacinda Ardern stated that she has "not sensed an appetite from New Zealanders" to review the country's constitutional structure as a monarchy. New Zealand MP and co-leader of the Māori Party Debbie Ngarewa-Packer, who had criticized the Crown in the past, commented on the allegations of racism and said, "I don't know why everyone is so surprised that the Crown is racist".

Canadian prime minister Justin Trudeau stated "I won't comment on what's going on over in the U.K., but I will continue to endeavour to fight against racism and intolerance every single day in Canada". He also sent his best wishes to the members of the Royal Family, adding that the people had the right to talk about constitutional change but the government's priority at the moment was to tackle the COVID-19 pandemic. Jagmeet Singh, leader of the New Democratic Party, also commented on the matter and said the Canadian monarchy "is in no way beneficial to Canadians in terms of their everyday life. And with the systematic racism that we've seen, it seems to be in that institution as well".

A spokesperson for US president Joe Biden said he would praise anyone for having the courage to speak out about mental health. When asked about the interview in a press briefing, the White House press secretary Jen Psaki described Harry and Meghan as "private citizens" who were "sharing their own story in their own struggles". Former United States secretary of state Hillary Clinton defended Meghan, saying: "This young woman was not about to keep her head down, you know, this is 2021". Commenting on Meghan's allegations of racism within the palace, former first lady of the United States Michelle Obama said, "it wasn't a complete surprise to hear." Speaking on the royal family, Obama also commented, "I pray for forgiveness and healing for them so that they can use this as a teachable moment for us all." In response to rumors that Meghan may run for president in 2024, former US president Donald Trump commented: "I'm not a fan of her. I know the Queen, as you know, I've met with the Queen and I think the Queen is a tremendous person and I am not a fan of Meghan." Otherwise, Trump reportedly stated: "You realize if you say anything negative about Meghan Markle, you get canceled. Look at Piers [Morgan]."

In an interview with BBC, Prince Albert II of Monaco criticized the couple's decision to do a tell-all interview and stated, "These types of conversations should be held within the intimate quarters of the family, it doesn't really have to be laid out in the public sphere like that".

=== The Royal Family's response ===
According to BBC News, the interview led to "crisis meetings involving senior royals". On March 9, Buckingham Palace released a statement in response, saying: "The issues raised, particularly that of race, are concerning. While some recollections may vary, they are taken very seriously and will be addressed by the family privately. Harry, Meghan and Archie will always be much loved family members." When asked about the interview by the reporters during a visit to an East London school on March 11, Prince William responded to the allegations of racism by saying, "We're very much not a racist family". Reporting on the couple's relationship with the royal family, CBS This Morning presenter Gayle King stated that Harry had started conversations with his father and brother but "those conversations were not productive". In response to the allegations of racism, a source close to the palace stated that in order to tackle the issue they had "the policies, the procedures and programmes in place but we haven't seen the progress we would like in terms of representation and more needs to be done, we can always improve". They added that it was "too early" to announce any "firm plans", but the royal family was supportive of the idea to have someone in charge of diversity and inclusion in the royal households.

=== Markle family's response ===
On March 9, Meghan's father Thomas Markle appeared on Good Morning Britain and apologized to his daughter for cooperating with the media outlets and making her feel betrayed. He added that he still remained estranged from Meghan. On March 25, Thomas Markle "hand delivered a letter to Oprah Winfrey – asking her to interview him about his relationship with estranged daughter Meghan".

In response to Meghan's claim that she had seen her half-sister "at least 18 or 19 years ago", Samantha Markle provided Inside Edition with photographs of the two of them throughout the years, including one from Samantha's college graduation in 2008. Samantha also refuted Meghan's claim that she had changed her surname back to Markle after realizing that Meghan was dating Prince Harry by showing a petition for name change from 1997 as well as her college diploma, on which her surname appears as Markle. She also commented on her half-sister's mental health issues, stating that she had "no sympathy" for Meghan as "depression is not an excuse for treating people like dishrags and disposing of them".

On March 3, 2022, Samantha sued Meghan by filing a defamation lawsuit in Florida, seeking damages in excess of $75,000. She accused Meghan of making "demonstrably false and malicious statements" which subjected her to "humiliation, shame and hatred on a worldwide scale," as well as damaging their father's reputation to fabricate a "rags to royalty" narrative. Meghan's lawyers described the lawsuit as "a continuation of a pattern of disturbing behavior." In a response filed in May 2022, Meghan's attorneys argued that her half-sister's claims were "demonstrably false", and the statements made by Meghan during the Oprah interview were either "non-actionable opinion or substantially true". In June 2022, Meghan's initial motion to dismiss the case was rejected by a judge following amendments made by Samantha in her complaints. She filed a second motion in the same month. In February 2023, legal documents made available by the Florida district court revealed that Samantha wanted both Meghan and Harry to give depositions under oath. Judge Charlene Edwards Honeywell later denied the application to halt the discovery process, but dismissed the lawsuit in March 2023. In April 2023, Samantha refiled the lawsuit with an amended complaint that covered statements made by Meghan in her Netflix docuseries as well.

=== Public opinion ===
View source data.
British survey responses to the question, "From what you have read and heard, how much sympathy, if any, do you have for Harry and Meghan?"

A poll conducted by YouGov on March 8, after the American and Canadian broadcasts but ahead of the broadcast in the United Kingdom, found that a majority of adults in Great Britain had little sympathy for the royal couple. While 56% responded that they had "none at all" or "not very much" sympathy, 17% had "a fair amount" of sympathy, 12% had "a lot" of sympathy and 15% stated that they did not know. Another poll by YouGov in the same timeframe found that 21% of British adults thought that the interview was "appropriate" and 47% thought it was "inappropriate"; by contrast, 44% of American adults described it as "appropriate" and 20% described it as "inappropriate."

Subsequent polling conducted on March 12 found that 48% of British respondents had a negative attitude of Harry compared to 45% with a positive view, "the first time his net favorability rating had been negative". Additionally, three in 10 people had a positive view of Meghan, while 58% held a negative opinion. Another YouGov poll after the interview found at 68% of American adults surveyed either had "a fair amount" or "a lot" of sympathy with Harry and Meghan, whereas only 22% of British adults surveyed had sympathy with Harry and Meghan.

Meghan and Harry witnessed a decline in their popularity with the British public. In polls conducted a month after the interview aired, the public opinion of most senior royals improved. In contrast, Meghan and Harry's popularity further decreased between April and August 2021.

Polling by Morning Consult found United States residents had a far more favorable view of Meghan and Harry than the British did. It also found that Meghan and Harry were viewed more favorably by those who watched the interview. In addition, it found that the interview had done little damage to the favorability of other members of the royal family with United States residents who watched the interview. A more recent YouGov US poll, taken between March 13 and 17, found that Harry and Meghan's popularity in the United States declined after the interview.

A poll by The New Zealand Herald after the Oprah interview found that a majority of New Zealanders were more sympathetic to the Royal Family than to Meghan and Harry. Polling by Léger and the Association for Canadian Studies found that, after the interview, an increased number of Canadians believed that the Canadian monarchy is obsolete. Polling conducted after the interview by extra.ie found the Irish public to be unsympathetic to Harry and Meghan.

=== Viewership ===
According to CBS, the special had been seen by over 49.1 million viewers worldwide through March 8.

Broadcasters and estimated viewership, by region
Region	Network	Date	Estimated viewership (in millions)
Australia	Network 10	March 8, 2021	1.4
Austria	ORF 1	March 8, 2021	—N/a
Belgium	Eén	March 8, 2021	0.9
Brazil	GNT	March 11, 2021	—N/a
Canada	Global	March 7, 2021	3.21
Chile	TVN	March 12, 2021	—N/a
Croatia	RTL	March 8, 2021	—N/a
Czech Republic	ČT2	April 1, 2021	0.351
Czech Republic	ČT2	April 5, 2021	—N/a
France	TMC	March 8, 2021	1.4
Germany	RTL/VOX	March 8, 2021	—N/a
Greece	ANT1	March 8, 2021	—N/a
Iceland	Sjónvarp Símans	March 8, 2021	—N/a
India	Colors Infinity	March 28, 2021	—N/a
India	Colors Infinity	April 4, 2021	—N/a
Ireland	RTÉ2	March 8, 2021	0.7
Israel	yesDocu	March 8, 2021	—N/a
Italy	TV8	March 9, 2021	1.2
Middle East	OSN	March 17, 2021	—N/a
Middle East	OSN	March 20, 2021	—N/a
Netherlands	Net5	March 9, 2021	1.5
New Zealand	Three	March 9, 2021	—N/a
Poland	TVN24	March 8, 2021	1.32
Portugal	SIC	March 14, 2021	0.4
Romania	Prima TV	March 21, 2021	—N/a
Scandinavia	TV3/Viafree	March 8, 2021	1.04
Spain	Antena 3	March 13, 2021	1.89
Spain	laSexta	March 14, 2021	0.45
Sub-Saharan Africa	M-Net	March 8, 2021	—N/a
Switzerland	SRF 1	March 13, 2021	—N/a
United Kingdom	ITV	March 8, 2021	14.8
United States	CBS	March 7, 2021	17.8
United States	CBS	March 12, 2021	3.11
International^{α}	American Forces Network	March 8, 2021	—N/a
Notes:^α American Forces Network is broadcast internationally to U.S. Military stationed or assigned overseas

== Awards and nominations ==
Year	Award	Category	Nominee(s)	Result	Ref.
2021	Primetime Emmy Awards	Outstanding Hosted Nonfiction Series or Special	Tara Montgomery, Terry Wood, Brian Piotrowicz, Brad Pavone, Lindsay Flader and Oprah Winfrey	Nominated	
2021	Television Critics Association Awards	Outstanding Achievement in News and Information	Oprah with Meghan and Harry: A CBS Primetime Special	Nominated	
2021	People's Choice Awards	The Pop Special of 2021	Oprah with Meghan and Harry: A CBS Primetime Special	Nominated	

== See also ==
- Charles: The Private Man, the Public Role, a 1994 documentary and interview with Charles, Prince of Wales
- "An Interview with HRH The Princess of Wales", a 1995 interview with Diana, Princess of Wales
- "Prince Andrew & the Epstein Scandal", a 2019 interview with Prince Andrew, Duke of York
- Harry: The Interview, a 2023 interview with Prince Harry only
