= Megxit =

Withdrawal from royal duties of the Duke and Duchess of Sussex

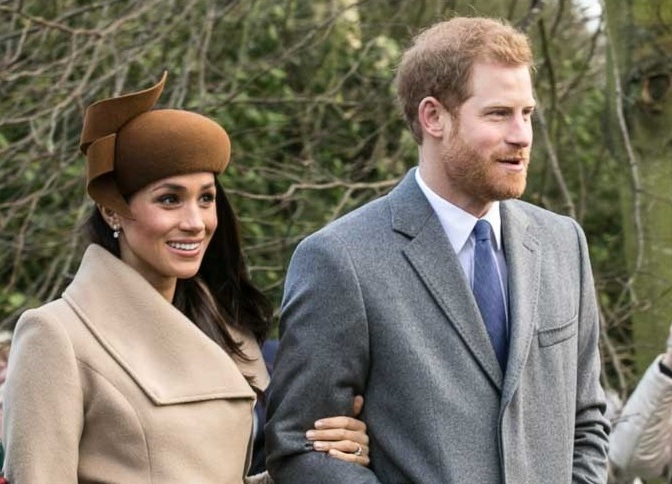
Meghan Markle and Prince Harry on Christmas Day, 2017

On 8 January 2020, Prince Harry, Duke of Sussex, and Meghan, Duchess of Sussex, announced on Instagram their decision to "step back as 'senior' members" of the British royal family, split their time between the United Kingdom and North America, become financially independent, and only represent the monarchy on a reduced basis. The decision was dubbed Megxit, a portmanteau of the words "Meghan" and "exit" and a play on the term Brexit. The term was adopted globally on mainstream and social media, spawning various Internet memes and "Megxit" merchandising. Harry has regarded "Megxit" as a misogynistic term aimed at Meghan.

The announcement of their decision led to a meeting of the royal family on 13 January, dubbed the "Sandringham Summit" and described as "unprecedented". Queen Elizabeth II issued a rare personal statement on her family, and was praised for her rapid handling of the matter. On 18 January, an agreement was announced whereby the couple, while still valued members, would "no longer be working members of Britain's royal family", and would not use their "Royal Highness" styles.

The outcome was described as a "hard Megxit", as their offer of occasional work for the monarchy was refused. Collins English Dictionary added "Megxit" to its online edition as a top-ten Word of 2020. A twelve-month review period was allowed in case the couple changed their minds. On 19 February 2021, Buckingham Palace confirmed that the Duke and Duchess would relinquish their royal patronages, as they were not returning as working members of the royal family. The couple's announcement of their decision came to signify the break by the couple from the royal family and its protocol, and their plans for independence under their new brand, then tentatively named Sussex Royal.

In August 2026, however, the couple were reported to be relocating to the UK with their children for an extended period, with Archie and Lilibet set to attend school there from September. It was reported that there were no plans for them to resume public duties as working members of the royal family, a position that was subsequently reaffirmed by King Charles III in a letter circulated by the Lord Chamberlain following their return to the UK.

== Etymology ==
Megxit is a play on the term Brexit and refers to Prince Harry and his wife Meghan stepping back as members of the British royal family. It derives from Meg(han) + (e)xit, influenced by Brexit, which was the withdrawal of the United Kingdom from the European Union at the end of January 2020. Collins English Dictionary included "Megxit" as one of its ten "Words of 2020", and listed it in the online edition of the dictionary: Collins told The Times: "It immediately caught on due to its echoes of 'Brexit'". The use of Meghan's name has been taken in some quarters as identifying her as the instigator of the withdrawal.

=== Naming ===
The British tabloid newspaper The Sun is credited with the first headline use of "Megxit" on 9 January 2020. BBC News commented that "Sussexit" was trending on social media, but it did not reach the level of use achieved by "Megxit" in mainstream media. Alternative terms appeared but did not catch on to the same degree. By 15 January, the term had become sufficiently widespread that The Times reported: "Megxit turns into a moneyspinner" for merchandisers who had made clothing and souvenirs using the term. The New York Times wrote that the parallels between "Megxit" and Brexit were greater than "clever wordplay", and that the two terms involved similar divisions in British public opinion between "young liberals" (who supported the couple and supported staying in the EU), and "older conservatives" (who supported the Queen and supported leaving the EU).

On 19 January, in reviewing the final agreement, The Guardian argued that "stepping back" was no longer appropriate, although the couple had also not "resigned" or "abdicated" from the royal family. When reviewing the media reaction to the final agreement, BBC News said "there are no winners as a result of what many of the front pages are calling "Megxit" – the exit of the Duke and Duchess of Sussex as front-line royals". BBC News, and other British news media, described the final agreement as a "hard Megxit", in a further wordplay on the political term, hard Brexit. On 28 January, the term had become sufficiently pervasive that the Financial Times, in its FT Advisor supplement, ran a piece for taxation professionals titled, "What if your client wants to do a 'Megxit'?", while Vanity Fair reported on actor Brad Pitt's "Megxit joke" at the 73rd British Academy Film Awards. The outlet had previously reported on an analysis by the social data analytics firm Brandwatch, which concluded that the term "Megxit" had been in use on Twitter since at least early 2019 and was used in negative comments aimed at Meghan. Sky News reported that the term was being used by trolls on the Internet back in April 2019. In November 2021, in a panel at Wired's Re:Wired Conference, Harry stated that "the term Megxit was or is a misogynistic term, and it was created by a troll, amplified by royal correspondents, and it grew and grew and grew into mainstream media. But it began with a troll."

== Motivations ==
In October 2019, a source close to the couple spoke to People, stating that they could establish a second base in the U.S., Canada or Africa to escape tabloid scrutiny. Immediately after the announcement in January 2020, in which they said they were aiming to become financially independent, journalist Tom Bradby claimed that the Sussexes were told during their six-week Christmas break (which turned into a four-month stay) at Vancouver Island in Canada that they would not be part of a proposed "slimmed down monarchy". Other concerns raised included perceived ongoing hostile treatment by some in the British tabloid press and alleged issues of racism towards Meghan. The Guardian reported that Prince Harry appeared to "lay the blame at the feet of the press". In a March 2021 television interview with Oprah Winfrey, Harry and Meghan said Megxit was caused by them not getting the help they sought from the royal establishment on issues such as refuting false tabloid stories about Meghan and getting her mental health help. Harry also indicated members of his family closest to the royal institution are trapped – British constitutional scholar Robert Hazell agrees, and argues that the institution requires a very significant loss of human rights from some of its members.

In their 2022 Netflix docuseries Harry & Meghan, Meghan suggested that the couple wanted to move to another country where they would not be bothered by the Royal Rota. In 2018, they considered moving to New Zealand, followed by another plan to move to South Africa in 2019, the latter of which, despite being approved by the royal family, was "scrapped" according to Harry after details of it were published by The Times in April 2019. By December 2019, Harry and Meghan were in negotiations with his father, Charles, about moving to Canada: "By the time I was speaking to my father from Canada, the family and their people knew that we were trying to find a different way of working for a minimum of two years," suggesting that they had intended to leave even before their wedding.

Dan Wootton has been credited with breaking the story about Megxit and Harry and Meghan's initial plans for moving to Canada in The Sun on 8 January 2020, which prompted the couple to issue an announcement within hours, confirming their plans for stepping back from their royal duties. Wootton stated that he had been in contact with the couple's spokesperson on 28 December and gave them a ten days' notice before the story broke out, despite facing pressure from royal officials not to run the piece. Sources close to the couple later spoke to The New York Times, stating that they "felt forced to disclose their plans prematurely" as they learned about The Sun's intentions to publish the story. Wootton said, "They released the statement after we had published the story and had so much notice."

== The agreement ==
The Times speculated as to whether the "Sandringham Summit" would result in a "Hard Megxit" or a "Soft Megxit". After the meeting, the Queen issued a first-person statement, concluding that there was agreement to "a period of transition in which the Sussexes will spend time in Canada and the UK". After just under four months in Canada, Harry and Meghan moved with their son Archie to the United States, where their daughter Lilibet was born in 2021.

=== Final agreement ===
The 'Megxit' statement gave a "Spring 2020" deadline for completion of the agreement, specific known details are as follows:

==== Main details ====
- The couple will no longer represent the monarch. This was in contrast to the couple's earlier statement on their sussexroyal.com website that they would carry out future duties for the Queen.
- They will retain the Royal Highness style but will not use it.
- They will be financially independent of the British exchequer (and will repay the £2.4 million renovation costs of Frogmore Cottage);
- Harry would cease duties for all British military appointments (including Captain General Royal Marines), and would no longer officially represent the royal family at military ceremonies.

==== Other details ====
- The couple will spend most of their time in North America.
- Frogmore Cottage would continue to function as their British home, but they would pay a "commercial rent" for it.
- The couple would retain their private patronages and associations (e.g. Invictus Games), but not royal ones (e.g. Commonwealth Youth Ambassador).

==== Items not included ====
- The couple's security arrangements were unclear, with the Queen's statement commenting only that "There are well established independent processes to determine the need for publicly-funded security."
- It was not clear whether the "Sussex Royal" brand could be used.

=== Further developments ===
==== 2020 ====
The Times reported Meghan had signed a voiceover deal with Disney, saying that "The arrangement offers a hint of the couple's future life, using their celebrity status to benefit their chosen causes". Business Insider, speaking to various brand experts, reported: "Megxit, how Harry and Meghan could build a billion-dollar brand".

On 19 January 2020, it was reported that Prince Charles would provide the couple with "private financial support" (but not funds from the Duchy of Cornwall), for a full year to give the couple time to establish themselves, and to address fears of the increased costs of their proposed new lifestyle. Later, Harry claimed that security protection and financial support had been cut off by the royal family in "the first quarter" of 2020 and he was able to provide for the family through the money he inherited from his mother, who left him £6.5 million which was invested and gathered substantial interest, and an estimated £10 million was given to Harry on his 30th birthday. During a Clarence House briefing on finances preceding the annual Sovereign Grant report, a spokesperson stated that Charles "allocated a substantial sum" to support the Duke and Duchess until the summer of 2020. Representatives for the couple responded that Harry's statements were "in reference to the first quarter of the fiscal reporting period" which begins in April.

On 21 January 2020, Canadian Prime Minister Justin Trudeau again refused to say who would be picking up the security cost tab upon Harry's reported return to Canada that same day. Separately, The Canadian Press confirmed that Harry, Meghan, and Archie were staying at a rented house north of Victoria, British Columbia.

On 14 February 2020, it was reported that the couple had decided to close their office at Buckingham Palace.

On 19 February 2020, the announcement was made that the couple would continue undertaking royal duties until 31 March, after which they would step back and no longer undertake engagements on behalf of the Queen. The couple would continue engagements on behalf of organisations they were involved with, including the 2020 London Marathon in April and the Invictus Games in May (although the latter two events were postponed for October 2020 and 2021 respectively due to the COVID-19 pandemic). They would cease using their HRH titles, while the Duke would retain his military ranks, but see the honorary military positions he holds suspended. The situation would then be reviewed after twelve months, in March 2021. Additionally, the couple's attempt to make use of the word "Royal" as part of their planned "Sussex Royal" brand venture was put under review, with an announcement to be made at the planned organisation's official launch.

On 21 February 2020, the couple confirmed they would not use the "Sussex Royal" brand "in any territory" following their withdrawal from public life in spring 2020 and all applications filed for trademarking the name were removed. A spokesperson for the couple added that they would continue to work with their existing patronages in addition to establishing a non-profit organisation.

On 27 February 2020, Bill Blair, the Canadian Minister of Public Safety and Emergency Preparedness issued a statement saying "As the Duke and Duchess are currently recognized as Internationally Protected Persons, Canada has an obligation to provide security assistance on an as-needed basis. At the request of the Metropolitan Police, the Royal Canadian Mounted Police (RCMP) has been providing assistance to the Met since the arrival of the Duke and Duchess to Canada." The statement went on to say that Canada would cease providing security for the couple on 31 March, "in keeping with their change in status." In the same announcement, it was confirmed the RCMP had provided security for the couple on an as-needed basis, since their arrival to Canada in November 2019. During their five-month stay on Vancouver Island, Harry and Meghan were protected by the Metropolitan Police and the RCMP, at a cost to Canadian taxpayers of over $90,000(CAD) in overtime and expenses: RCMP officers' salaries were not included. In February 2020 and after their exit from the monarchy was negotiated, the term Internationally Protected People was removed from their website.

In late March 2020, it was reported that the couple had relocated to the United States. In response to the US President Donald Trump's comments that the U.S. government would not pay for the couple's security, a representative of the couple said they had "no plans to ask the U.S. government for security resources". During the couple's initial months in California, Tyler Perry provided them with a secure house (in Beverly Hills), until they were able to make an alternative plan. The American-based private security firm, Gavin de Becker and Associates, was eventually contracted to provide security arrangements for the couple.

On 30 March 2020, the couple announced that they would no longer use either their "SussexRoyal" Instagram account or website. Furthermore, it was reported that after closing their office at Buckingham Palace a new team would manage the couple's public image and philanthropic interests in the U.S. with Sunshine Sachs hired to manage their image and Catherine St. Laurent, a former Bill & Melinda Gates Foundation employee, to serve as their chief of staff and run their non-profit organisation.

On 6 April 2020, it was reported the couple started the paperwork in the U.S. for a new non-profit organisation, which will be called Archewell (named for their son Archie and from the Greek word archē).

On 20 April 2020, the Duke and Duchess announced that they would no longer cooperate with the British tabloids, including Daily Mail, The Sun, Daily Mirror, and Daily Express, as well as the Sunday and online editions of those publications.

In July 2020, the Duke and Duchess bought a mansion in Montecito, California, with the intention to make it their family home. It was later claimed by royal reporters Omid Scobie and Carolyn Durand that the couple had taken out a mortgage on their new home. In September 2020, the Duke paid back the refurbishment costs of Frogmore Cottage in full, an estimated £2.4m. In November and December 2020, it was reported that his cousin Princess Eugenie and her husband Jack Brooksbank had moved in and out of Frogmore Cottage at Home Park, Windsor, after six weeks' stay.

==== 2021 ====
On 15 February 2021, CBS revealed the Duke and Duchess of Sussex would be giving an interview to Oprah Winfrey. Meghan would discuss "stepping into life as a royal, marriage, motherhood, philanthropic work (and) how she is handling life under intense public pressure," with Winfrey. Harry would join them to "speak about their move to the United States and their future hopes and dreams for their expanding family".

On 19 February 2021, Buckingham Palace confirmed that the couple would not return as working members of the royal family. They further added that the couple would not "continue with the responsibilities and duties that come with a life of public service". As a result, the Duke and Duchess were required to give up several military, honorary and charitable appointments. Among the patronages and appointments that were given up by the Duke were:

- Captain General, the Royal Marines
- Honorary Air Commandant, RAF Honington
- Commodore-in-Chief, Royal Navy Small Ships and Diving
- President, The Queen's Commonwealth Trust
- Patron, the Rugby Football Union
- Patron, the Rugby Football League

Similarly the Duchess gave up her roles as:

- Vice-President, The Queen's Commonwealth Trust
- Patron, the Royal National Theatre
- Patron, the Association of Commonwealth Universities

Harry kept his patronages of the Invictus Games Foundation, Sentebale, WellChild, and Walking With The Wounded, while Meghan remained patron of Smart Works and Mayhew (the latter until 2022). A spokesperson for the couple stated that Harry and Meghan "have offered their continued support to organisations ... regardless of official role", and asserted that "service is universal".

In March 2021, Forbes estimated that the cost for the couple's around-the-clock protection to be around $2 to $3 million per year. In April 2021, data obtained after the submission of a request under the Freedom of Information Act revealed that Santa Barbara County Sheriff's Office had dealt with "calls recorded as phone requests, alarm activations and property crimes" between July 2020 and February 2021, all of which were related to the couple's security issues at their residence in Montecito. In the same month, The Daily Telegraph reported that Harry and Meghan had held meetings surrounding "well-developed proposals" with the now-defunct streaming service Quibi a year before their departure from the royal family. The couple reportedly met with Jeffrey Katzenberg and other executives "throughout 2019", with alleged plans to "discuss [..] their own series of 10-minute videos".

==== 2022–2023 ====
In January 2022, it was revealed that Harry had been in a legal fight since September 2021 to challenge the Home Office's refusal to allow him to pay for police protection in a personal capacity when in the UK. His legal representative stated that Harry initially made the offer during the Sandringham Summit, but it was dismissed. After stepping back from his duties, the Royal and VIP Executive Committee (RAVEC) had placed him in an "exceptional category", as a result of which his future police protection in the UK would be contingent on the reason and circumstances of each visit as well as the functions he carries. After receiving applications by the Duke and the Home Office to keep parts of the case private, the High Court ruled in March 2022 that some parts of it would remain confidential. High Court judge, Jonathan Swift, also reacted to the Duke's legal team sending a copy of the ruling to someone who was not a lawyer, describing it as "entirely unacceptable". Harry's lawyers later claimed that his suggestion to pay for his security was not conveyed properly to the committee by members of the Royal Household, including the Queen's private secretary Sir Edward Young, whose membership in the committee was allegedly not known to him and with whom Harry was facing "significant tensions". Lawyers for the Home Office stated that tensions between Harry and the Royal Household were irrelevant to his change of status and his representations to the committee would have made no difference in the outcome. In July 2022, Swift granted permission for part of Harry's claim to proceed for a judicial review.

In April 2022 and on their way to attend the Invictus Games in the Netherlands, the couple made their first joint visit to the United Kingdom since stepping back from royal duties and met the Queen and Prince Charles. The Duke had previously been in the UK on his own for his grandfather's funeral in April 2021 and for unveiling a statue of his mother in July 2021. The couple made their first official appearance in the UK in June 2022 while attending the Platinum Jubilee National Service of Thanksgiving. They were expected to visit the UK and Germany in September 2022 for a number of charity events in Manchester, Düsseldorf, and London.

In May 2022, Santa Barbara Police Department received reports of two trespassing incidents at Harry and Meghan's California home within the span of 12 days. As of July 2022, they have had six security incidents in total at the property since May 2021, though one of them occurred after the alarm was "mistakenly tripped". In August 2022, Harry filed a lawsuit against the Home Office and the Metropolitan Police, challenging the decision by RAVEC from January 2022 which stated that State security could not be made available to private individuals even if they wished to pay for it themselves. In November 2022 and in an interview with Channel 4 News, Neil Basu, the former National Police Chiefs' Council lead for Counter Terrorism Policing, confirmed the existence of threats against Meghan and Harry, some of which were investigated and resulted in prosecutions.

In February 2023, a High Court judge ruled that the second case should be thrown out; however, the decision was later appealed by Harry's legal team. In May 2023, Harry attended the coronation of his father alone. He lost the legal challenge in May 2023, meaning that he will not be allowed to make private payments for police protection. In June 2023, a Freedom of Information request revealed that Harry's legal fight with the Home Office had cost £502,236, with £492,000 covered by the state and the remaining £10,000 covered by Harry.

In June 2023, Buckingham Palace confirmed that Harry and Meghan had moved out of Frogmore Cottage. In October, Byline Times reported that Charles withdrew £700,000 in funding for Harry and Meghan, forcing them out of the Sandringham Agreement and spurring their pursuit of commercial deals in the US. This was reportedly because Harry had named, in a legal letter sent in April 2020, a key aide to Prince William who had allegedly received payments from Dan Wootton, then an executive editor of The Sun newspaper, for stories about Megxit and Archie, in a "cash-for-leaks scandal". This reporting corroborated Harry's own account in his memoir Spare, which Wootton had previously denied.

A letter submitted as evidence to the court in December 2023 showed correspondence between the Queen's private secretary Sir Edward Young and Sir Mark Sedwill, the then Cabinet Secretary, in which Young emphasised that Harry and Meghan's security was of "paramount importance" to the Queen and her family though decisions about the provision of publicly funded security would be left to the British government, the Canadian government and the government of any other host country. This went against Harry's narrative that, following their choice to leave the UK, the royal family cut them off.

==== 2024–2025 ====
In February 2024, Harry travelled alone to the UK to meet his father following his cancer diagnosis. In the same month, the High Court ruled against Harry in his case against the Home Office and upheld the decision by RAVEC, stating that there had been no unlawfulness in the decision-making process for his security arrangements. In April 2024, he lost an initial attempt to appeal against the ruling. Despite his lawyers' attempts to have him pay no more than 50% of the Home Office's legal costs of defending his challenge, the judge held him liable for 90% of the costs. It was also revealed that during the proceedings Harry had leaked information via email to "a partner of Schillings" and to Johnny Mercer, for which he apologised to the court. In May 2024, he was given permission by the Court of Appeal to challenge the High Court's decision. His appeal was rejected by three senior judges in May 2025 and he was likely to be held liable for the UK government's legal fees.

In September 2025, Harry met his father briefly at Clarence House. In December 2025, it was announced that, for the first time since April 2019, RAVEC would reassess Harry's threat level. The decision followed a private letter he had sent to Home Secretary Shabana Mahmood earlier in the year. In June 2026 and ahead of a potential visit to the UK with his family, the government declined Harry's request for police protection outside royal residences.

==== 2026 and relocation to the UK ====
In July 2026, Meghan and the children joined Harry on a visit to the UK as he marked one year until the 2027 Invictus Games, during which they privately met with King Charles III and Queen Camilla. During the visit, the family also stayed at Althorp, the home of Harry's uncle Charles Spencer and the place where his mother, Diana, is buried.

In the following month, Harry and Meghan, along with their children, relocated to the UK for an extended period, with the children set to start school in the UK in September. It was further reported that the couple would reside at a house in England while maintaining their properties in California and Portugal, though they were not expected to resume public duties on behalf of the Crown, a position that was subsequently reaffirmed by King Charles III in a letter circulated by the Lord Chamberlain following their return to the UK. The letter further clarified that their HRH styles remained in abeyance. Although their position was described as "akin to private citizens with commercial and charitable interests", it was later reported that the couple preferred the term "public figures", and would have liked an acknowledgement that, on a personal level, they remained members of the royal family. In October 2026, Harry and Meghan made their first joint appearance in the UK since their relocation, attending a series of engagements in Nottingham.

== Reactions ==
=== In Britain ===
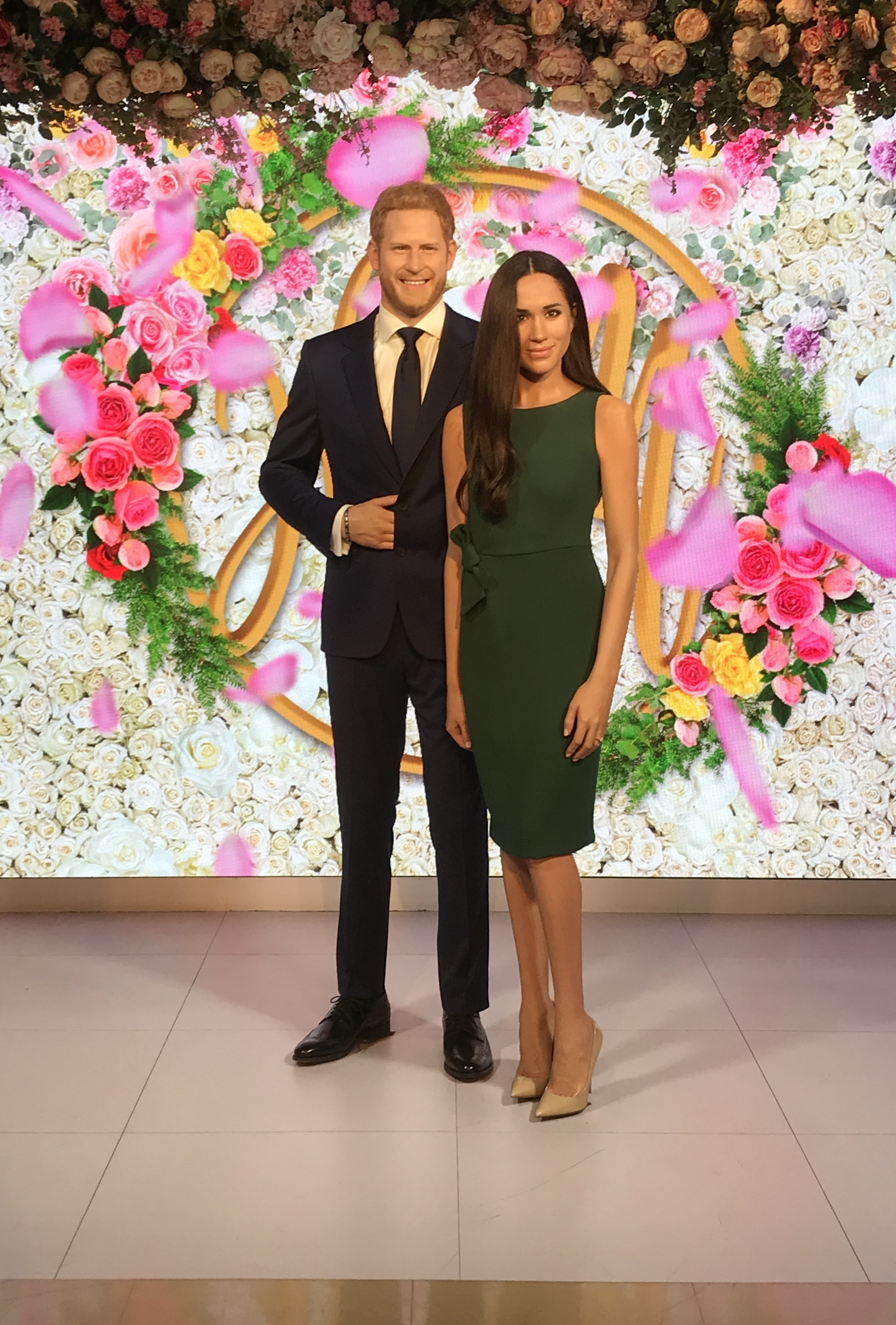
Waxwork figures of the Duke and Duchess of Sussex were subsequently moved away from the Royal Family display at Madame Tussauds London.

The initial British reactions to the 8 January announcement was of surprise, and concern whether the decision was properly thought through; the story dominated the British news cycle. The Washington Post noted several British polls that showed general support for the couple's desire to move, but with concern over the future exposure of the British exchequer to the couple (and issues of the renovation costs of Frogmore Cottage), and with unhappiness that the Queen's approval had not been sought for their announcement.

British prime minister Boris Johnson distanced himself from the news, stating: "The royal family is one of the great, great assets of this country. I'm sure they are going to sort it out and I don't think it's necessarily helped by commentary from me." Former House of Commons Speaker John Bercow stated that Meghan experienced "racism, sexism and misogyny". Bercow maintained Meghan's support of feminist values and criticism of Donald Trump angered UK "bigot factions". Bercow stated further he understood Meghan and Harry choosing to leave their royal roles, and added "They are entitled to put their marriage and health first." NBC News reported on analysis implying that the impact to the British economy from the loss of the couple could be material. Madame Tussauds immediately moved its waxwork figures of Harry and Meghan away from the display including the other members of the British royal family to a separate area.

On 19 January, The Daily Telegraph described the final agreement between the couple and the royal family as "the hardest possible Megxit", a view shared by many other British news sources; and that "Royal history was made". The Guardian reported that the "outcome is, perhaps, not the half-in, half-out role the couple appear to have anticipated". On 20 January 2020, royal biographer Penny Junor also told The New York Times that "The family is trying to prevent a half-in, half-out arrangement, which doesn't work". On 22 January, The Guardian published a cartoon by illustrator Andrzej Krauze, titled "Brexit and Megxit", saying "The rest of the EU is mesmerised as the UK prepares for Brexit – and Harry and Meghan begin their transition to exiting the royal family".

=== In Canada ===
The initial news was for the most part positively received in Canada, where the Duchess of Sussex had based herself with her son, Archie. The Prime Minister of Canada, Justin Trudeau, publicly welcomed the couple, and indicated that Canada would fund security protection for the couple while they were resident there. The Wall Street Journal reported: "'Megxit' Causes Global Uproar. Canada Shrugs".

An opinion poll by the National Post found that 61 per cent of 1,515 Canadians polled wanted Harry to become Governor General of Canada. Chris Selley of the National Post was cynical of the national response and the poll, writing: "The prospect of the Sussexes decamping to Canada seems to have activated a sort of dormant monarchism in many of us, or at least an appreciation for the "modern-day fairy tale" – and that in turn has utterly incensed those who think monarchies are a grotesque anachronism and can't understand why everyone else doesn't agree with them". The Globe and Mail published an editorial that rejected the idea of the couple moving to Canada, stating that it broke an "unspoken constitutional taboo" about Canada maintaining distance from the monarchy, expected to rule from afar, stating: "They reign from a distance. Close to our hearts, far from our hearths." The editorial also called for the Canadian government to reject the moving plans. However, the chairman of the Monarchist League of Canada commented that it "doesn't change the constitutional status of the Queen or the vice-regals" in the country".

In a poll released on 15 January by the Angus Reid Institute, 70 per cent of Canadians surveyed followed the developments of Megxit. In the same poll, half of Canadians surveyed stated they do not care if the couple spent significant time in Canada, while 39 per cent of respondents were in favour of it, and 11 per cent found it upsetting. Support for the couple spending significant time in Canada was strongest in Atlantic Canada, and Ontario, and was weakest in Quebec. However, 73 per cent of those surveyed by Angus Reid say that the security costs should be covered by the couple themselves. An online petition from the Canadian Taxpayers Federation garnered more than 90,000 signatures by 23 January 2020, demanding that the couple pay out of their own pocket for their security, which according to the Canadian Taxpayers Federation was, at least, C$93,000 in overtime and expenses for the November 2019 to January 2020 portion of their stay that ended in mid-March 2020. Aaron Wudrick, Federal Director of the CTF, said, "We're proud to have given voice to the vast majority of Canadians who felt subsidizing the Sussexes’ lifestyle choices was an outrageous use of tax dollars."

As of February 2021, the total for security costs, as well as reimbursements made by the Sussexes, if any, had not been disclosed by the RCMP. However, according to records obtained by CBC News through an access-to-information request, it was revealed that between the 2014/15 and 2019/20 fiscal years, the RCMP spent at least C$539,575 on security for Harry during his visits to Canada. The figure, which exceeded the C$334,337 previously disclosed by the RCMP in 2021, represented the highest amount spent on any internationally protected person visiting Canada during the period and accounted for roughly 10 percent of the more than C$5.2 million spent protecting over 100 internationally protected persons. The disclosed costs covered incremental expenses such as officer overtime and travel but excluded regular police salaries, meaning the total cost of protection was higher. The records showed expenditures of C$105,955 in 2016/17, C$364,859 in 2017/18, C$866 in 2018/19, C$904 in 2019/20, C$56,405 for Harry and Meghan in 2019/20, and C$10,586 for Meghan during a private visit in 2018/19.

=== Elsewhere ===
- On 12 January, Brian Moylan wrote an opinion piece for NBC News, stating the press's treatment of the couple needed to change "But partly withdrawing for more control seems like a fool's errand. There might be a balance to be struck between just how public they want their lives to be and how they're covered, but the Sussexes are lying to themselves — or us — by acting as if they are above the lucrative cycle of influence, access and branding that is the modern celebrity culture."
- On 20 January, American public broadcasting news program PBS NewsHour had a piece entitled, "Why Harry and Meghan's 'Megxit' is a crossroads for the UK on race", saying that: "Megxit shows where the UK falls short on reckoning with race", and questioning the "myth of 'post-racial' societies".
- On 21 January, the South China Morning Post ran an opinion by Melissa Stevens: "Why Megxit is a win for women and girls: there's a lot more to real life than being a princess", and asking the question "what woman, especially a self-proclaimed feminist, would really be satisfied with living a life where she can't speak out or act without royal clearance?"
- On 22 January, Armstrong Williams wrote an opinion in The Hill titled: "Megxit, Trump and the generational divide", that concluded, "If one paid attention to only Obama's or Markle's race, one might see the social evolution one is seeking. But if one looks at the social and economic divides they also inhabit, one could also see why the reaction against them, among the working class, has been so stark".
- On 23 January, journalist Michael Barbaro hosted a podcast for the New York Times, "Harry and Meghan. (And Why Their Saga Matters.)" with the tagline: "They were expected to modernize a former empire in a moment of political transition. Instead, Harry and Meghan walked away", and how themes in modern Britain, such as race, diversity, and Brexit, might have shaped the couple's decision.
- On 27 January, political science university professor Eileen Hunt Botting wrote an opinion in the Washington Post titled "'Megxit' wouldn't have surprised 18th-century political thinkers", that noted, "While Brexit stages the exit of Britain from the European Union after a contentious popular referendum, Megxit dramatizes a different and in some ways deeper form of democratization".
- On 18 March, Caitlin Flanagan writing in The Atlantic said that "Meghan and Harry overplayed their hand", and that "Megxit is the most complicated, self-involved, grandiose, shortsighted, letter of partial, fingers-crossed resignation in history".

== Sussex Royal ==
On 1 July 2019, documents were filed at Companies House registering the incorporation of Sussex Royal The Foundation of the Duke and Duchess of Sussex listing the Duke and the Duchess as Directors. During August through to October 2019 they appointed broadcaster and former Desert Island Discs presenter Kirsty Young, financier and philanthropist Stefan Allesch-Taylor, business leader and media executive Karen Blackett and banker Steven Cooper to serve as Directors of their Foundation. Harry and Meghan also used the handle @sussexroyal on Instagram, which previously belonged to Kevin Keiley. Keiley, a Reading F.C. fan from West Sussex, said that his handle was changed by Instagram to @_sussexroyal_ without any representatives of Harry and Meghan contacting him first. Instagram said his handle was changed because the account was inactive.

On 8 January 2020, the couple provided further back-up statements to their Instagram post, via a link on their Instagram post to a new website, sussexroyal.com, a brand platform that was initially expected to form an important part of their plans for financial independence, and which posted follow up statements on their announcement. The website was designed by the same Canadian team who built The Tig for Meghan in 2017, and was completed over the Christmas holidays when the couple were in Canada.

By 10 January, newspapers were reporting that the couple filed for a trademark for "Sussex Royal" on a range of items including clothing and printed items, though it also emerged that an Italian applicant had registered an EU application to trademark products using a "Sussex Royal" brand. The word "Royal" and images of royal crowns have special protection under UK intellectual property law.

On 11 January, The Daily Telegraph reported that the couple would launch their "Sussex Royal Foundation" in April modelled along the lines of Obama Foundation, Clinton Foundation, and Bill & Melinda Gates Foundation. Follow-up reports showed the couple had filed World Intellectual Property Organization trademarks for: "Sussex Royal the Foundation of the Duke and Duchess of Sussex". In 2019, the couple stepped back from The Royal Foundation, which they had led jointly with the Duke and Duchess of Cambridge. Later reports indicated that the couple would not establish a foundation of their own.

It was not clear from the final agreement on 18 January, how the "Sussex Royal" brand would be affected, or whether it could be used by the couple in the manner anticipated. The Guardian reported Palace sources saying, "The prospect of the Sussexes cutting commercial deals, while still at times representing the monarch, was too great a risk to the reputation of the House of Windsor and the monarchy". The Guardian noted that a previous attempt by Prince Edward, Earl of Wessex, to gain financial independence from the British royal family had failed.

On 21 February 2020, it was confirmed that "Sussex Royal" would not be used as a brand name for the couple. Harry and Meghan were expected to establish a non-profit organisation later in 2020. Meanwhile, Sussex Royal Foundation was renamed MWX Foundation on 5 August 2020 and dissolved the same day. Companies House filings showed that Sussex Royal had more than £280,624 ($380,000) in 2020 and spent £41,084 ($55,600) on attorneys.

In March 2021, it was reported that the Charity Commission for England and Wales was conducting a review of the organisation in a "regulatory and compliance case" regarding its conduct under charity law during dissolution. Representatives for the couple claimed that Sussex Royal was "managed by a board of trustees" and that "suggestion of mismanagement" directed exclusively at the Duke and Duchess was incorrect. Representatives for the couple stated that around $350,000 was transferred from Sussex Royal to Travalyst, which is a non-profit organisation established by Harry "for which [he] receives no commercial or financial gain".

== Finding Freedom and controversy ==
In May 2020, two months after the couple's exit, HarperCollins announced the publication of Finding Freedom: Harry, Meghan and the Making of a Modern Royal Family, a biography of the Duke and Duchess authored by royal reporters Omid Scobie and Carolyn Durand. The book was reported to detail the events leading up to Megxit and reveal "unknown details about the couple's life together" with "participation of those closest to the couple". Media outlets reported that the Sussexes gave an interview to the book's authors before their royal departure, which representatives for the couple denied.

Extracts of the book were serialised in The Times and The Sunday Times in the weeks prior to its release. Finding Freedom was released on 11 August 2020. The book subsequently topped bestseller lists in the United Kingdom and the United States. Finding Freedom received mixed reviews from critics. The New York Times wrote that while the book made "it easier to understand why the couple felt the need to exit the Firm" by laying out the media policy and competitive bureaucracy of the British royal family, "too much space" was dedicated in an effort to provide details for "record-correcting context". The book was noted for specifying intimate details such as "the Duke and Duchess of Sussex's text messages", a description of the Queen's private sitting room at Buckingham Palace, and providing conflicting details of the private relationship between the couple and Duke and Duchess of Cambridge. Finding Freedom was also criticized for its timing of release, with The Guardian stating that "It is not Harry and Meghan's fault that their book has come out in the middle of a global pandemic, but it does underscore their occasional tone deafness in the latter half of the book." As in July 2020, The Spectator wrote: "Despite revealing details that presumably only people who were in the room when it happened could ever conceivably know, we are expected to believe that Carolyn Durand and Omid Scobie wrote Finding Freedom without input from the Sussexes".

After the book's release, a spokesperson reiterated that the couple "were not interviewed and did not contribute to ‘Finding Freedom'." In November 2020, Meghan's legal team admitted that she had permitted a close friend to communicate with Scobie and Durand, "so the true position... could be communicated to the authors to prevent any further misrepresentation", confirming the Duchess's participation in the book.

== See also ==
- List of portmanteaus
