= Annus horribilis =

Latin phrase meaning "horrible year"

Annus horribilis (pl. anni horribiles) is a Latin phrase that means "horrible year". It is complementary to annus mirabilis, which means "wonderful year".

== Origin of phrase ==
The phrase "annus horribilis" was used in 1891 in an Anglican publication to describe 1870, the year in which the dogma of papal infallibility was defined in the Catholic Church.

== History ==
=== Volcanic winter (536) ===
Year AD 536 has been regarded by historian Michael McCormick as "the beginning of one of the worst periods to be alive, if not the worst year". A volcanic eruption very early in the year (or possibly late 535) led to a protracted period of global cooling in the Northern Hemisphere. This was followed by further eruptions in 539-40, and 547. The volcanic eruptions caused crop failures, drought, and were accompanied by the Plague of Justinian, famine, and millions of deaths. It also initiated the Late Antique Little Ice Age, which lasted from 536 to 660.

=== Salazar (1961) ===
In 1961 Portuguese dictator António de Oliveira Salazar's Estado Novo regime saw a number of crises that are seen as ultimately setting off its downfall in motion. That year saw the Santa Maria hijacking, the beginning of the Portuguese Overseas War, Botelho Moniz's putsch and India's invasion of Goa. The surrounding years also saw other inauspicious events for the regime, such as the Peniche jailbreak, UNGA Resolution 1514, and the Academic crisis of 1962.

The year is accordingly called "o Ano Horrível de Salazar", and sometimes "o Ano de Todos os Perigos", the latter literally meaning "the Year of All Dangers", a reference to the Portuguese title of The Year of Living Dangerously.

=== British monarchy (1992) ===
The "annus horribilis" expression increased in prominence after usage by Queen Elizabeth II in a speech at Guildhall on 24 November 1992, marking her Ruby Jubilee on the throne. She said:

1992 is not a year on which I shall look back with undiluted pleasure. In the words of one of my more sympathetic correspondents, it has turned out to be an annus horribilis.

The "sympathetic correspondent" was later revealed to be her former assistant private secretary Sir Edward Ford. The unpleasant events which happened to the royal family in this year include:

- publication of photographs pertaining to an affair between Sarah, Duchess of York, and Texan oil millionaire Steve Wyatt (18 January);
- separation of the Queen's second son Prince Andrew, Duke of York, from his wife Sarah (19 March);
- divorce of the Queen's daughter, Anne, Princess Royal, from Captain Mark Phillips (23 April);
- publication of Diana, Princess of Wales' tell-all book Diana: Her True Story, revealing the problems in her marriage to the Queen's eldest son, Charles, Prince of Wales, particularly his affair with Camilla Parker Bowles (The Sunday Times, 7 June);
- publication of photographs of Sarah sunbathing topless with her friend John Bryan (20 August);
- publication of taped, intimate phone conversations between Diana and James Gilbey (24 August); and
- a fire in Windsor Castle, one of the Queen's official residences (20 November).

After the Queen delivered her speech, one more notable event transpired: the separation of Charles and Diana (9 December).

==== 2019 ====
The year 2019 was described by some commentators as a second annus horribilis for the British royal family. In January that year, 97-year-old Prince Philip crashed his car into another carrying two women and a baby, and subsequently surrendered his driving licence. Later on in August, the Queen was involved in a constitutional crisis when Prime Minister Boris Johnson advised her to prorogue Parliament, a recommendation later ruled unlawful by the Supreme Court of the United Kingdom. Her son Prince Andrew gave a universally-criticised BBC Newsnight interview about his relationship with convicted child-sex offender Jeffrey Epstein, and there was increased tabloid scrutiny of rifts between the Cambridge and Sussex households.

==== 2024 ====
Multiple media outlets described 2024 as an annus horribilis for various members of the British royal family, such as King Charles III (Elizabeth's successor who became king two years earlier following her own death) and his eldest son, William, Prince of Wales, as well as the wider royal family in general.

The year 2024 was difficult for the monarchy, with significant events including the cancer diagnoses of both the King and Catherine, Princess of Wales, weeks of speculation over Catherine's whereabouts before her diagnosis was disclosed, continued controversy surrounding the King's younger brother, Prince Andrew (later Andrew Mountbatten-Windsor)'s conduct and the continued fallout over Megxit, such as the publication of Omid Scobie's book Endgame. The monarchy's popularity with younger generations also continued to decline, with one YouGov poll conducted in August suggesting more 18 to 24 year-olds would favour a republic (43% for republic, 35% for monarchy).

Prince William described 2024 as the "hardest year of [his] life".

=== Boris Yeltsin (1998) ===
Time magazine described 1998 in Russian politics as an annus horribilis because of Boris Yeltsin's isolationist and militarist policies, the East Asian financial crisis, and Western countries cutting off the reform money that they gave to the Russian government in prior years.

=== Ben Affleck (2003) ===
Hollywood actor and filmmaker Ben Affleck once said that 2003 was his annus horribilis. Affleck starred in the films Daredevil and Gigli, both of which received negative reviews from critics. Gigli was a box-office bomb and drew particular ire from Hollywood critics and moviegoers, which culminated in six wins at the 24th Golden Raspberry Awards ceremony. In addition, Affleck with his fiancée and later second wife, Jennifer Lopez, were mocked and criticised by the public for their seemingly accommodating attitudes to and henceforth over-exposure in the tabloid media.

=== Kofi Annan (2004) ===
Kofi Annan, the United Nations Secretary-General, used the phrase in his year-end press conference on 21 December 2004. He reflected: "There's no doubt that this has been a particularly difficult year, and I am relieved that this annus horribilis is coming to an end." His remarks were widely interpreted as having alluded to persistent allegations of corruption in the UN's Iraq Oil-for-Food Program. He also spoke of upheaval and violence in Afghanistan, the Democratic Republic of the Congo, Iraq, Palestine, and Sudan; the ongoing process of UN internal reform; and "persistent...criticism against the UN" and himself personally. Annan's remarks came five days before the deadliest event of the year (and one of the deadliest natural disasters in history): the Indian Ocean tsunami on 26 December, which killed 227,898 people.

=== Spanish monarchy (2007) ===
In 2007, the Spanish royal family, in particular King Juan Carlos I, faced a difficult year. Family tragedy and a series of controversies led Spanish newspapers to refer to the year as the king's annus horribilis.

- In February, Érika Ortiz Rocasolano, the youngest sister of Letizia, then Princess of Asturias, died of a sedative overdose in her apartment.
- In July, a humour magazine, El Jueves, published a drawing on the cover depicting Felipe VI (then Prince of Asturias), and the aforementioned Princess Letizia having sex, with a caption reading: "Just imagine if you end up pregnant. This will be the closest thing to work I've ever done in my life." It satirized a proposal by the government to give 2,500 euros to the parents of newborn children. The magazine was banned and removed from distribution, which led to a censorship controversy.
- In September, Catalan separatists were tried for having burned photographs of King Juan Carlos and Queen Sofía at an anti-monarchy and Catalan separatist rally in Girona while the royal couple toured the city.
- In early November at the XVII Ibero-American Summit, after a verbal altercation between Hugo Chávez, President of Venezuela, and José Luis Rodríguez Zapatero, Prime Minister of Spain, the king admonished Chávez, "¿Por qué no te callas?" ("Why don't you shut up?").
- Shortly after the summit, the royal house announced the separation of the king's daughter, the Duchess of Lugo, and her husband, Jaime de Marichalar. The couple has two children, Felipe and Victoria.

=== Michael J. Fox (2018) ===
Michael J. Fox used the term in his 2020 memoir No Time Like the Future: An Optimist Considers Mortality multiple times (in Chapters 19 and 21) to describe his experiences in 2018; he also referred to 2018 as "a terrible, horrible, no good, very bad" year.

=== COVID-19 pandemic (2020) ===
The year 2020 was widely remarked as being an annus horribilis for the entire world in general, most notably due to the COVID-19 pandemic, which began in late 2019 and rapidly spread worldwide throughout 2020. 2020 was also awarded a "Special Governors' Award for The Worst Calendar Year EVER!" at the 41st Golden Raspberry Awards. At the end of the year, Netflix released Death to 2020, a mockumentary discussing the events of the year.

=== Iran (2024) ===
Journalist David Leonhardt of the New York Times described 2024 as an annus horribilis for the Iranian government, citing the failed outcome of the strikes against Israel in April, the death of President Ebrahim Raisi in May, the death of the core leadership of the Iranian-backed Hamas and Hezbollah during their respective wars against Israel (including the assassination of Hamas's Ismail Haniyeh in Tehran on July), the reelection of Donald Trump in November, and the collapse of the Assad regime in Ba'athist Syria in December.

== See also ==
- List of Latin phrases
- Rampjaar, the Dutch "disaster year" of 1672
- The Islamic year 311 AH (923/924 CE) was known as the "Year of Destruction" (sanat al-damār) due to the Qarmatians' Sack of Basra and the attack on the Hajj caravan.
