= Betrayal (Bower book) =

2026 biography by Tom Bower

- First edition
- Author: Tom Bower
- Language: English
- Subject: Prince Harry, Duke of Sussex; Meghan, Duchess of Sussex; British royal family
- Genre: Biography
- Publisher: Bonnier Books UK
- Publication date: 26 March 2026
- Publication place: United Kingdom
- Media type: Print
- Pages: 464
- ISBN: 9781785126406

Betrayal: Power, Deceit and the Fight for the Future of the Royal Family is a 2026 biography by Tom Bower about the British royal family.

Excerpts from the book were published in The Times prior to publication. The book was published by Bonnier Books UK in March 2026.

== Claims ==
The book recounts an alleged argument in 2018 at Prince William and his wife Catherine's apartment in Kensington Palace, shortly after Prince Harry and his wife Meghan returned from their honeymoon. During the exchange, Meghan is said to have sharply told William to take his finger out of her face, as a meeting intended to reconcile the couples broke down while Harry observed. According to Tom Bower, William had previously cautioned Harry before the engagement that his relationship with "the American actress" was progressing too quickly. The author claims William was skeptical of Meghan from the outset, a view Catherine reportedly shared because both believed Harry had experienced a troubled period involving alcohol, drugs, therapy, and unstable relationships after the death of his mother. Bower writes that although Meghan's decisiveness appealed to Harry, it worried William and Catherine, who allegedly felt she was dissatisfied with her role in London, unhappy about Harry's limited prospects of becoming king, and resentful that she would never be queen. The account further alleges that, encouraged by Meghan, Harry began asserting greater independence from palace management, rejecting the traditional role of the royal "spare" associated with his uncle Prince Edward, distancing himself from friends, and even changing his phone number without informing relatives, while Bower argues that Harry's outlook increasingly reflected Meghan's influence and that his emotional reactions grew more intense; the book also attributes to Queen Camilla a private remark suggesting Meghan had "brainwashed Harry".

Bower also references his earlier biography, which he says examined Meghan's background and alleged that she distanced herself from family members and acquaintances in pursuit of fame while reshaping aspects of her past, a narrative the author links to the couple's 2021 interview with Oprah Winfrey. The book further claims that Meghan's public appearances with Harry since then have often coincided with promotional opportunities, portraying her as pursuing commercial ventures in California while continuing to promote her version of events about her life, which critics have argued diverges from objective facts. In the same account, Harry is depicted as increasingly detached from Britain, with reduced charitable involvement and an enduring estrangement from William and Catherine, and he is said to have been surprised by William's response to revelations concerning the then-Prince Andrew and Jeffrey Epstein, which reportedly contributed to fears that a future King William could remove the Sussexes’ titles or otherwise marginalise Harry within the United Kingdom. The book also addresses Meghan's entertainment ventures, claiming that at a 2025 Netflix preview event she appeared unexpectedly at Kerry Washington's birthday celebration amid speculation she had arrived uninvited, while her program With Love, Meghan was reportedly absent from the platform's promotional material and Harry's polo documentary series allegedly ranked poorly in Netflix's internal listings. Following criticism in the media, the couple's advisers reportedly suggested they visit victims of the Los Angeles wildfires, where the pair filmed interactions through their Archewell organisation and shared the footage on Meghan's Instagram account; filmmaker Justine Bateman publicly criticised the visit as a publicity stunt and referred to them as "disaster tourists".

The book discussed Meghan's keynote speech at the One Young World Summit 2022 in Manchester, where organisers reportedly worried beforehand that her prepared remarks focused heavily on herself rather than the conference theme of ethical leadership; strict conditions were also imposed on the event, including tight ticket control, exclusion of most journalists, and limited access for allies such as Omid Scobie and photographer Misan Harriman. Bower also describes mounting tensions around Harry and the charity Sentebale, which he established in 2006. While visiting Tokyo and Singapore in August 2023, on a trip funded by Japanese philanthropist Haruhisa Handa through the International Sports Promotion Society, Harry was informed by the newly appointed chair, Sophie Chandauka, that the organisation was experiencing serious internal and financial challenges. A brand analysis commissioned by Chandauka suggested that controversy surrounding Harry's media ventures—including his memoir Spare—and the public attention around Meghan had discouraged corporate sponsors, leading several American donors and companies such as Audi to withdraw their support. Matters worsened after a disagreement involving donor representative Midori Miyazaki, which prompted Handa's organisation to cancel its sponsorship and removed roughly 23 percent of Sentebale's funding. In response, the charity began restructuring—closing its London office, relocating leadership closer to its programmes in Lesotho, and broadening its mission beyond HIV/AIDS through a strategy known as "Project Pivot". Disputes between Harry and Chandauka over these developments intensified, and by March 2025 Harry, Prince Seeiso, and the trustees stepped down, after which Sentebale reported that it continued its work and maintained similar annual funding while supporting around 78,000 children.

Bower's account also examines Meghan's participation in the Invictus Games in Vancouver, alleging that she travelled there by private jet and that organisers were instructed to address her as "Ma'am" and Harry as "Sir", directions said to have been communicated by the games' chief executive Nick Booth, who had replaced two earlier executives reportedly dismissed after objecting to the couple's security and travel expenses. The book further alleges that Harry's lifestyle costs associated with the event were covered through government and corporate funding, while some critics considered Meghan's presence a distraction from the focus on injured veterans, with one former executive quoted as describing her as "bling, not rehabilitation". According to Dominic Reid of the Invictus Foundation, media coverage had often prioritised the couple rather than the competitors themselves. The book says this continued during the opening ceremony, where Katy Perry performed to a large audience, many of whom came mainly for the concert. Bower also writes that videos produced by Archewell and curated social-media posts emphasised Meghan's appearances, clothing, and interactions, prompting some observers to nickname the event the "Meghan Games", while her affectionate gestures toward Harry during the ceremony were interpreted as efforts to create compelling imagery for photographers. The book additionally recounts a sparsely attended wheelchair basketball game between the United States and Nigeria, claiming that only a few dozen paying spectators were present in a venue built for thousands and suggesting that several American players appeared able to walk after the match, while volunteers were said to outnumber spectators.

The narrative later addresses the couple's finances, asserting that by 2025 the Sussexes required approximately $3 million annually after taxes to maintain their lifestyle and that their previous deals with Netflix and Spotify had ended, leaving them reliant largely on Harry's speaking engagements and Meghan's commercial endorsements. Meghan's lifestyle brand As Ever is described as having reported large jam sales and profits that critics questioned, with the author alleging unsold products remained stored and that her television series attracted relatively low viewing figures. Financial scrutiny is also directed at the Archewell Foundation, whose reported income declined while expenses remained high; the organisation was subsequently renamed "Archewell Philanthropies" and some initiatives were transferred to ParentsTogether, a shift presented by the Sussexes as an expansion of their charitable reach but interpreted by critics as a retreat from earlier philanthropic ambitions. Staff departures from the organisation are also discussed. Finally, Bower suggests the couple hope to regain a stronger role within the British royal family through the 2027 Invictus Games in Birmingham by encouraging Harry's father, King Charles III, to open the event, potentially creating a prominent media appearance for Meghan and their children; however, he notes that possible protests over Israel's participation and the continuing tensions with William and Catherine could complicate any reconciliation, leaving the royal dispute unresolved and raising the possibility that the games might deepen the divide.

== Refutations ==
Harry and Meghan said through a spokesperson that Bower's "commentary has long crossed the line from criticism into fixation" and that he had made his career "out of constructing ever more elaborate theories about people he does not know and has never met". The couple said that Bower had publicly stated 'the monarchy in fact depends on actually obliterating the Sussexes from our state of life' which was "language that speaks for itself". The statement concluded by saying "Those interested in facts will look elsewhere; those seeking deranged conspiracy and melodrama know exactly where to find him".

== Reception ==
Anita Singh of The Daily Telegraph gave the book two out of five stars, while calling it a negative portrait of the Duke and Duchess of Sussex; she also noted anecdotes showing Meghan as "tone-deaf" and self-focused and Harry as anxious and "fully converted to Meghan's gospel", and criticised its reliance on anonymous sources and repetitive accounts of past controversies.
