= Markle Windsor Foundation =

Former British charitable organisation

Markle Windsor Foundation (MWX)
- Named after: Combined family names
- Founded: 1 July 2019; Sussex Royal Foundation
- Founded at: London, United Kingdom
- Type: Private company limited by guarantee in England and Wales
- Registration no.: 12077679
- Legal status: Voluntary liquidation
- Purpose: Not specified
- Headquarters: 25 Moorgate,
- Location(s): London, England; EC2R 6AY
- Region served: United Kingdom
- Current director (Active): The Duke of Sussex; Amount Guaranteed £1
- Secretary: Gerrard Tyrrell (terminated 1 July 2019)
- Board of directors: • The Duke of Sussex • The Duchess of Sussex (resigned 1 July 2020) • Stefan Paul Allesch-Taylor (resigned 1 July 2020) • Karen Tracey Blackett (resigned 1 July 2020) • Natalie Denise Campbell (resigned 22 Aug 2019) • Steven Martin Cooper (resigned 1 July 2020) • Kirsty Jackson Jones (resigned 1 July 2020) • Sara Latham (resigned 22 Aug 2019)
- Remarks: Name changed to MWX Foundation while being dissolved, 5 August 2020
- Formerly called: Sussex Royal The Foundation of The Duke and Duchess of Sussex (aka Sussex Royal)

Markle Windsor Foundation was a proposed transitional name for Sussex Royal The Foundation of The Duke and Duchess of Sussex, a British charitable organisation intended to support the work of Prince Harry, Duke of Sussex, and Meghan, Duchess of Sussex, after the couple left the Royal Foundation in June 2019 to carry out their own projects. Sussex Royal Foundation was renamed MWX Foundation on 5 August 2020 and dissolved the same day.

== Formation ==
On 1 July 2019, Prince Harry, Duke of Sussex, and Meghan, Duchess of Sussex, registered a private company limited by guarantee in England and Wales under the title 'Sussex Royal The Foundation of The Duke and Duchess of Sussex', alternatively referred to as Sussex Royal Foundation. However, after a meeting with senior members of the royal family, it was confirmed on 21 February 2020 that the couple would not use 'Sussex Royal' as a brand name after they stepped down as working royals in spring 2020. In July 2020, appropriate paperwork was filed to dissolve the UK charity.

== Dissolution ==
At the end of July 2020, an official notice to change the name to Markle Windsor Foundation was reportedly withdrawn. Companies House paperwork revealed that a formal name change to 'MWX Foundation' was registered on 5 August 2020. It was later reported that MWX could be an abbreviation for 'Markle Windsor Foundation'. Documents stated that Harry (who is from the House of Windsor), Meghan (née Markle) and the other five directors would change the registered name to 'MWX Foundation' while it was being dissolved. A 'Change of Name' notice was then filed within hours of the details becoming public. On 28 July 2020, a special resolution to wind up was passed, and a voluntary liquidator was appointed. The following day, the appointments of the secretary and all current directors (save for Harry) were terminated, and the Foundation ceased to legally exist on 5 August 2020.

The Duke and Duchess of Sussex said of the transition that they did not plan to start another foundation but "rather intend to develop a new way to effect change and complement the efforts made by so many excellent foundations globally". Since then, conflicting comments regarding the nature and operations of the organisation have been made by the couple.

In March 2021, it was reported that the Charity Commission for England and Wales was conducting a review of the organisation in a "regulatory and compliance case" regarding its conduct under charity law during dissolution, following a letter from anti-monarchist group Republic. Representatives for the couple claimed that Sussex Royal was "managed by a board of trustees" and that "suggestion of mismanagement" directed exclusively at the Duke and Duchess would be incorrect. The commission later concluded that the foundation did not act unlawfully, but criticised the board of directors for expending a "substantial proportion of funds" to setting up and closing the charity. "In response to the findings, Republic issued an apology to the foundations—and Harry specifically—for its actions" in campaigning for an investigation.

== Archewell ==
In April 2020, the couple confirmed that their new non-royal foundation (in lieu of Sussex Royal) would be called 'Archewell'. Archewell was registered in the United States, and its website was launched in October 2020. Archewell is not in any way associated with or endorsed by the British royal family.
