= Finding Freedom =

2020 biography

- First edition
- Authors: Omid Scobie; Carolyn Durand
- Language: English
- Subject: Prince Harry, Duke of Sussex; Meghan, Duchess of Sussex; Megxit
- Genre: Biography
- Publisher: Dey Street Books
- Publication date: 11 August 2020
- Publication place: United Kingdom
- Media type: Print
- Pages: 368
- ISBN: 9780063046108

Finding Freedom: Harry and Meghan and the Making of A Modern Royal Family is a biography by Omid Scobie and Carolyn Durand, revolving around the married lives of the Duke and Duchess of Sussex. The book was written with the Duchess's contribution through a third-party source. It was published on 11 August 2020 by HarperCollins.

== Summary ==
The biography describes the lives of Prince Harry, Duke of Sussex, and Meghan, Duchess of Sussex, over the course of their courtship, marriage, and eventual departure from the British royal family. The book goes into detail about their relationship, royal household and personal lives.

== Background and writing ==
In May 2020, two months after Megxit, HarperCollins announced the forthcoming publication of Finding Freedom, a biography of the Duke and Duchess authored by royal reporters Omid Scobie and Carolyn Durand. Durand is a producer and writer with two decades of experience with the Royal Rota. She has previously interviewed multiple members of the royal family and contributes regularly to print outlets. Scobie is the royal editor for Harper's Bazaar, and regularly contributes to Good Morning America and ABC News. He reportedly "maintains strong access to the Sussexes' working world."

The book was reported to detail the events leading up to Megxit and reveal "unknown details about the couple's life together" with "participation of those closest to the couple". The information in the book was stated to have been drawn from "more than one hundred sources". Media outlets reported that the Sussexes had contributed to Finding Freedom, which representatives for the couple initially denied. In November 2020, Meghan's legal team admitted that she had permitted a close friend to communicate with Scobie and Durand, "so the true position... could be communicated to the authors to prevent any further misrepresentation", confirming the Duchess's participation in the book.

In July 2021, it was announced that an updated version of the book containing a new epilogue would go on sale on 31 August. The new epilogue included information about the couple's thoughts on Prince Philip's death, their interview with Oprah Winfrey and their philanthropic and business endeavours through Archewell.

== Release and reception ==
Extracts of the book were serialised in The Times and The Sunday Times in the weeks prior to its release. Finding Freedom was released on 11 August 2020. The book subsequently topped bestseller lists in the United Kingdom and the United States, and sold more than 31,000 hardback copies after five days of being on sale.

Finding Freedom received mixed reviews from critics. The New York Times wrote that while the book made "it easier to understand why the couple felt the need to exit the Firm" by laying out the media policy and competitive bureaucracy of the British royal family, "too much space" was dedicated to an effort to provide details for "record-correcting context". The book was noted for specifying intimate details such as "the Duke and Duchess of Sussex's text messages", a description of the Queen's private sitting room at Buckingham Palace and providing conflicting details of the private relationship between the couple and the Duke and Duchess of Cambridge. Finding Freedom was also criticised for the timing of its release, with The Guardian stating that it wasn't the couple's fault that "their book has come out in the middle of a global pandemic, but it does underscore their occasional tone deafness in the latter half of the book."

=== Legal issues ===
In October 2019, it was reported that Meghan's team had begun legal proceedings against The Mail on Sunday and MailOnline for privacy violations and copyright infringement regarding a letter to her father published by Associated Newspapers Limited (ANL). The letter was mentioned in a section of Finding Freedom that detailed the Duchess's relationship with her father. In September 2020, ANL successfully applied to use the book in their defense, arguing that the Duke and Duchess had "co-operated with the authors of the recently published book Finding Freedom to put out their version of certain events".

In January 2021, The Mail on Sunday editor Ted Verity said in a witness statement that he had been informed by a member of the royal household that Harry and Meghan's communications secretary Sara Latham had "assisted the authors of Finding Freedom by performing a role that was essentially fact-checking, to make sure the authors got nothing wrong." In November 2021, the couple's former communications secretary Jason Knauf gave a statement to the court following ANL's appeal against a judge's ruling that accused them of breaching Meghan's privacy. Knauf mentioned the Duchess of Sussex gave him briefing points to share with the biography's authors and added that the Duke of Sussex had welcomed the suggestion that they should conceal their involvement with the process of writing the book. Meghan subsequently apologised to the court for not remembering the emails earlier and stated she "had absolutely no wish or intention to mislead the defendant or the court", adding that the "extent of the information" Knauf shared with the book's authors was "unknown" to her.
