= Endgame (Scobie book) =

2023 biography

- First edition
- Authors: Omid Scobie
- Language: English
- Subject: British royal family
- Publisher: HarperCollins
- Publication date: 28 November 2023
- Publication place: United Kingdom
- Media type: Print
- Pages: 416
- ISBN: 9780008534714

Endgame: Inside the Royal Family and the Monarchy's Fight for Survival is a book by Omid Scobie, revolving around the lives of members of the British royal family specifically in the final years of the life of Queen Elizabeth II and in the few months after her death. It was published on 28 November 2023 by HarperCollins.

== Summary ==
The book argues that the House of Windsor lost its protective barrier with the death of Queen Elizabeth II. Scobie explains why the monarchy needs to adjust to a society that is rapidly modernising and let go of outdated notions of race, class, and wealth.

== Background and writing ==
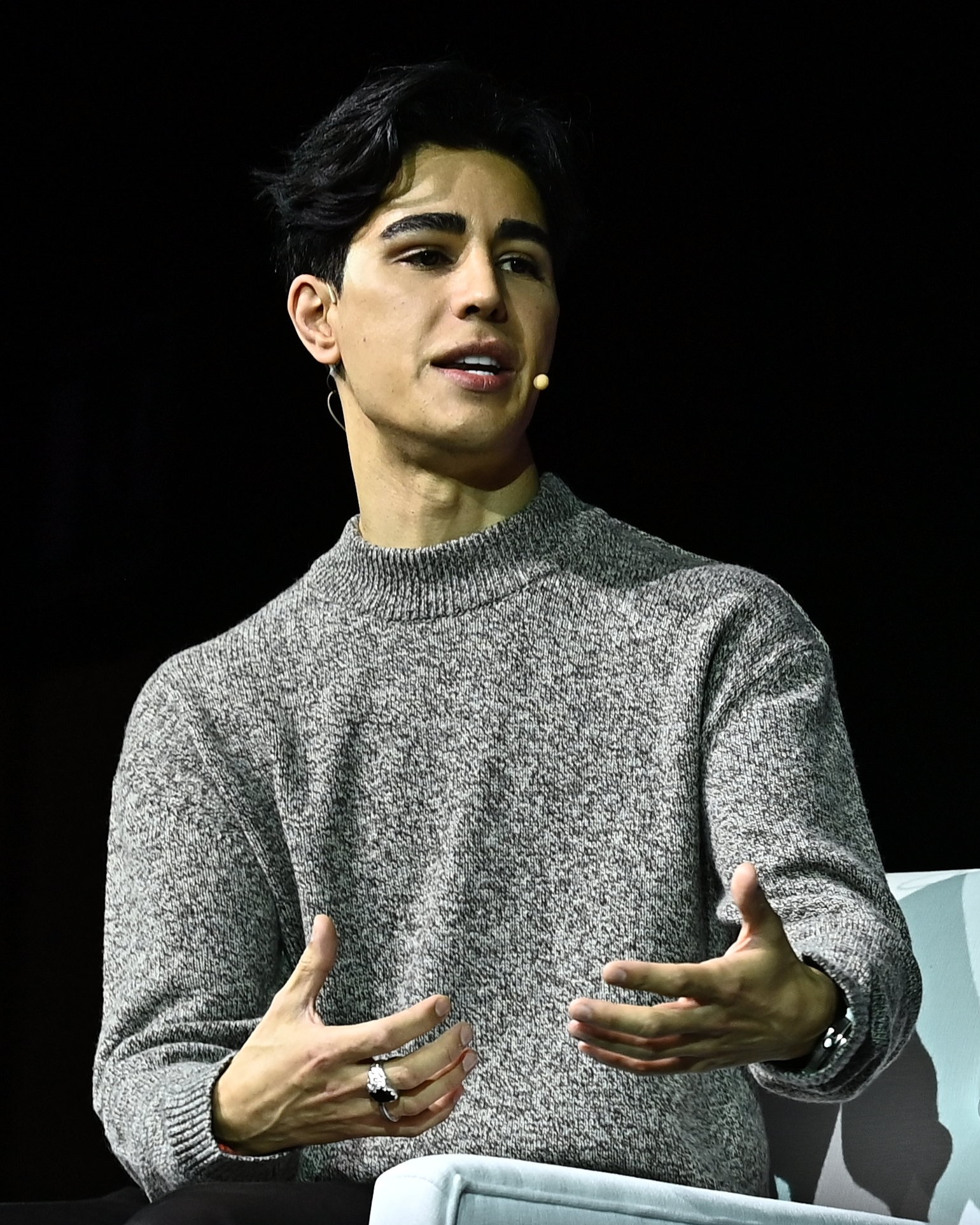
Omid Scobie in 2022

Scobie is the royal editor for Harper's Bazaar, and has also contributed to Good Morning America and ABC News. He reportedly "maintains strong access" to Prince Harry and his wife Meghan's working world. The book was reported to aim criticism at the British royal family as an institution as well as at individual members of the family. The information in the book was stated to have been drawn from "sources".

The Dutch edition of the book was recalled after it named King Charles III and Catherine, Princess of Wales as the two royals who were alleged to have asked questions about Prince Harry and Meghan's future child's skin colour. In a TV interview on This Morning, Scobie stated that he did not include the two names in his version of the book. He also claimed that he had anticipated the "heated and controversial" public reaction to his book, and that he had been subjected to "unfair attacks" and "character assassination". A week later he wrote in the i newspaper that, unbeknownst to him at the time, a draft of Endgame that had not yet been cleared by lawyers and contained the names had been sent to the Dutch publisher so that work could be started on translation, on the understanding that the translation would be updated to reflect the final version of the book. The Dutch publisher Xander Uitgevers disagreed with Scobie's account, calling it "factually incorrect". In 2026, Tom Bower refuted Scobie's claims in his book Betrayal and reiterated that the single conversation Harry referred to involved Charles and his wife Camilla at Clarence House in 2016, and it was a light-hearted conversation until Meghan decided to weaponise it.

== Release and reception ==
In the United States Endgame spent just one week on The New York Times hardback nonfiction bestseller list (at number 12), while in the United Kingdom it was reported to have sold 6,488 copies in its first five days, compared to 31,000 for Scobie's previous book Finding Freedom (2020) in its first five days.

BBC News's verdict on the book was that it covered familiar territory and felt somewhat dated. The reviewer said: "The Endgame of the title suggests an institution that's in serious trouble. But this won't be the book to sink it." Writing for The New York Times, Eva Wolchover stated that much of the information in the book was already available to the public and many parts of the book were "devoted to setting the record straight on petty slights against the Sussexes". Anita Singh of The Daily Telegraph gave the book two out of five stars and labeled it "ludicrous propaganda for Team Sussex" that "is laughably partial, devoid of insight and bizarrely misogynistic". Hilary Rose of The Times also believed the book shone a favorable light on Harry and Meghan and criticised the rest of the royal family as with Scobie "it never cuts both ways; there are no shades of grey, only good guys and bad guys". She added that the book is "not so much an incisive look at why he thinks the monarchy is doomed, more a mishmash of ancient history, ageing stories and a bit of new stuff, some of it interesting".
