= Stefan Allesch-Taylor =

British entrepreneur

Stefan Allesch-Taylor CBE FKC
- Born: 6 May 1969 (age 57); St Albans, England, UK
- Occupations: Entrepreneur, professor, Executive Producer, Broadcaster
- Known for: Business, Entrepreneurship, Philanthropy, Finance
- Children: 1
- Honours: CBE FKC

Stefan Paul Allesch-Taylor CBE FKC (born 6 May 1969) is a British entrepreneur, philanthropist, broadcaster, and educator. He was appointed Commander of the Order of the British Empire (CBE) in the 2014 New Year Honours and was appointed as the first Professor of the Practice of Entrepreneurship by King's College London in December 2016. He was made a Fellow of King's College London in 2020

Allesch-Taylor was named as one of London's most influential people in both 2017 and 2018's 'Social Pillars: Charity and Philanthropy' section of the London Evening Standard's Progress 1000 list.

== Early life and education ==
Stefan Allesch-Taylor was born in St Albans in Hertfordshire in 1969 He attended Giggleswick School in North Yorkshire and left school at 18. He stated in an interview with Times Higher Education that his biggest regret is 'not going to university'.

== Business ==
Allesch-Taylor has been described by the London Evening Standard as 'one of the Square Mile's foremost financiers'. As a chairman, CEO and Senior Director in business, Allesch-Taylor specialises in public companies. He first was Chief executive of a UK public company at 27 years old by which time he was already a millionaire. He has co-founded or invested in more than 50 companies across 15 countries over the past 25 years.

He has co-founded and/or been on the boards of companies in the hospitality, industrial, agriculture, retail, technology, sports, banking and financial services sectors. Allesch-Taylor is authorised and regulated by the UK Financial Conduct Authority as a corporate advisor, as well as being approved as a 'Controller' of an Asset Manager in Denmark and approved by the German Bundesbank as a 'Controller' of NordFinanz Bank AG, a German commercial bank. He chairs the Audit Committees of several companies of which he is a board member.

== Philanthropy and appointments ==
Allesch-Taylor considers philanthropy key to good business: "Companies need to take a look at being more socially impactful and engaging more with their consumer base". He is co-founder and chairman of the Afri-CAN Children's Charity, operating in Malawi and South Africa, which he established in 2010 with a $1 million donation. The Afri-CAN Children's Charity provides education and nutrition to over 3,000 vulnerable children in the townships of Cape Town.

Allesch-Taylor is chairman of the British-based charity Pump Aid. Pump Aid won the International Aid and Development Award at the 2017 UK Charity Awards for its innovative small business approach to relieving water poverty in Malawi.

He is also Deputy Chairman of the Central London Rough Sleepers Committee, providing support for London's homeless.

He was appointed as a Director of Sussex Royal, The Foundation of the Duke and Duchess of Sussex in September 2019 and served until the Foundation was dissolved in July 2020.

In April 2022 the Daily Mirror reported that Allesch-Taylor had joined a team of special forces veterans to assist in rescue missions to help orphans in Ukraine as a result of the 2022 Russian invasion of Ukraine.

== Academia ==
In December 2016, King's College London appointed Allesch-Taylor as its first Professor of the Practice of Entrepreneurship. His role involves delivering masterclasses at the new King's College Business School and lecturing and training the King's20 cohort. Part of his role is to encourage universities to progress, stating "The day universities cease to innovate is the day their world stops spinning"

In September 2018, it was announced Allesch-Taylor would be funding a £1 million collaborative research study between the King's College Institute of Psychiatry, Psychology & Neuroscience and its Entrepreneurship Institute with "the aim of finding and mapping neutral traits associated with a good business brain."

== Broadcasting and media ==
Allesch-Taylor writes a monthly column for Gentleman's Journal called 'Business School' and is a columnist at The Times. Previously, he presented a live radio show called Stefan Means Business on London's Soho Radio.

== Film and executive producing ==
Allesch-Taylor has executive produced 54 short films since 2010, including the multi award-winning FlySpy, Bricks and Ghosted. Further credits include: Gerry, Oksijan, Promise, Call Me Alvy, Baby Mine, Leash, Gone Dark, Lock In, The Riot Act, Bricks, Nazi Boots and 2012 feature comedy-drama Africa United.

In 2016 he was appointed a Judge and Best of the Fest Award Partner at the TriForce Short Film Festival held at BAFTA.

On 31 October 2017 Allesch-Taylor announced he was launching £1m of short film grants primarily awarded to UK projects with the aim of promoting diversity and inclusion in the UK film industry. The aim of these grants are to 'encourage entrepreneurialism from the production teams' and 'to create a long-term relationship with the film industry'. Recipients of the Allesch-Taylor Film Fund include Rachel by Caroline Bartleet featuring Jodie Whittaker and Little River Run, Ed Skrein's directorial debut.
