= Revenge (Bower book) =

2022 biography by Tom Bower

- First edition
- Author: Tom Bower
- Language: English
- Subject: Prince Harry, Duke of Sussex; Meghan, Duchess of Sussex; British royal family
- Genre: Biography
- Publisher: Blink Publishing
- Publication date: 21 July 2022
- Publication place: United Kingdom
- Media type: Print
- Pages: 464
- ISBN: 9781788705035

Revenge: Meghan, Harry and the war between the Windsors is a 2022 book by Tom Bower about the British royal family. The book was published by Blink Publishing in July 2022.

In response to the veracity of claims within the book, Bower said during an interview "I do have very good lawyers, and more importantly, I make sure what I write is the truth." He mentioned that he had spoken to 80 sources when compiling information for the book. An extract was published in The Sunday Times ahead of the book's release.

== Claims ==
The book claimed that in 2017 during a shooting weekend at Sandringham, Meghan Markle "challenged every guest whose conversation contravened her values". Her future stepmother-in-law, Camilla, Duchess of Cornwall allegedly "found it hard to believe that Meghan would sacrifice her independence to serve silently as a team player". Bower claimed that Meghan was disappointed with her 2017 Vanity Fair interview, which she had hoped would be about her "global philanthropy", but instead the headline read "She's Just Wild about Harry". Bower added that "Vanity Fair's fact checkers had raised questions" about Meghan's story involving her writing to P&G to change a sexist advertisement, and "after consulting P&G and advertising historians, [Vanity Fair] had concluded they could not prove the whole story. They could also find no evidence, as Meghan claimed, that she received a reply from [Hillary] Clinton. Unknown to Kashner, Thomas Markle knew Clinton and P&G had not replied to Meghan. The success of her 'campaign' was fictitious, invented by an adoring father."

After her marriage, Meghan reportedly refused an offer from Queen Elizabeth II and the then-Prince Charles to fly to the US to reconcile with her father Thomas Markle. Bower wrote "Meghan's excuses irritated Charles and perhaps also the Queen." Bower also discussed Prince Harry's attempts at drawing parallels between his wife and his mother, Diana, Princess of Wales, adding that Meghan "could not understand that Diana had won the public's affection after years of work". The couple's 2018 tour of Australia was described as a pivotal moment for them to step out of Prince William and his wife Catherine, Duchess of Cambridge's shadows with Meghan believing "she could provide the leadership the monarchy required" while earning "millions from her activism". Bower mentions that the couple struggled with the fact that they ranked below William and Catherine in the hierarchy and Meghan "hated the comparisons with uncomplaining Kate. In turn, the future queen regarded her neighbour as dismissive."

Bower adds that over Christmas 2019 Meghan was in communication with her US team to break away from the royal family and Harry would soon support the idea after seeing the Queen's Christmas broadcast which only featured photos of her father George VI, husband Prince Philip, eldest son and heir Charles and his wife Camilla, and grandson and second-in-line to the throne William and his family. He also claimed that the Queen was relieved when she realised Meghan, who was seven months pregnant with her second child, would not be attending Prince Philip's funeral, saying to one of her aides "Thank goodness Meghan is not coming". Bower adds that during the Queen's Platinum Jubilee, Charles ensured that Harry and Meghan as private citizens would not be invited to the Buckingham Palace balcony or ride in a royal carriage, which disappointed Meghan as in her view it damaged her value in the eyes of Netflix bosses.

== Feedback and reception ==
A source close to the Queen spoke to the media, stating that they believed it was highly unlikely that she would comment on Meghan's absence at her husband's funeral in a public way. Sam Kashner, the contributing editor for Meghan's 2017 Vanity Fair piece, was quoted in the book saying "[Meghan] complained because she wasn't presented in the way she wanted. She demanded that the media do what she expects. I felt manipulated." He later spoke to The Times, saying "I'm afraid Tom Bower didn't convey my admiration and respect for Meghan Markle ... I found Ms. Markle to be exceptionally warm and gracious and admired her intelligence and her remarkable courage, as I still do." Bower responded by stating that Kashner had been briefed in May ahead of the book's publication and at the time had not objected to any of the information presented in the book.

Writing for The Times, Melanie Reid argued that in Revenge Meghan is portrayed as a relentlessly ambitious, image-managing opportunist who allegedly reshaped her personal narrative, cultivated strategic relationships, and used her marriage to Prince Harry to pursue fame and influence—an account the reviewer found gripping but harsh, controversial, and ultimately somewhat pitiable. Anita Singh of The Telegraph gave the book 2 out of 5 stars and argued that Revenge portrayed Meghan as manipulative, but she ultimately criticised the book itself as overly biased, reliant on previously reported stories and hostile sources, and so relentlessly negative that it becomes tedious rather than convincing. Writing for The Guardian, Catherine Bennett similarly argued that Revenge depicted Meghan and Prince Harry as dangerous, scheming threats to the monarchy, but its poorly balanced attacks with exaggerated bias undermined its credibility.
