= Queen Elizabeth II Commonwealth Trust =

- Formation: April 2018
- Registration no.: 1172107
- Headquarters: Thomas House; 84 Eccleston Square; London, England SW1V 1PX
- Website: http://www.queenscommonwealthtrust.org
- Formerly called: Queen's Commonwealth Trust (2018–2025)

The Queen Elizabeth II Commonwealth Trust (QECT) is a charity that supports youths aged 18-35 across the Commonwealth. The charity's focus is on social entrepreneurs who have founded organisations to address problems in their communities. Queen Elizabeth II, the charity's patron, was succeeded by King Charles III.

It was originally formed as the Queen's Commonwealth Trust (QCT), then changed its name on 4 July 2025.

== History and mission ==
The Queen's Commonwealth Trust, also known as QCT, was launched on 21 April 2018 (the Queen's 92nd birthday) with her patronage and her grandson Prince Harry, Duke of Sussex as president. After marriage, Harry's wife Meghan was appointed vice president later that year. The couple retained their positions until February 2021. In May 2024, King Charles III became the charity's patron.

The QCT seeks to elevate the work of young people in their efforts for change and to equalise their efforts with professional organisations. The Trust operates as a network for young changemakers throughout the Commonwealth, to fund, connect, and platform discussions and projects on a local level. Periodically, online QCT chat sessions are conducted and uploaded to YouTube for public viewing.

In March 2019, The Queen's Trust gave QCT its final funds of £2,672,287 from a planned run-down.

In 2021, model Naomi Campbell became a global ambassador for QCT.

In the financial year 2020/2021, QCT paid nearly all of its income on staff costs, £787,314 of the £796,106 it raised. The staff costs of its five senior executives was £420,000. The charity put this down the difficulties of raising donations during the COVID-19 pandemic. The charity operated at a large deficit during the 2019/2020 and 2020/2021 financial years.

== Projects ==
QECT finds and funds youths who are making a difference in their local communities. Projects and organisations supported by the Trust revolve around the issues of poverty, climate change, lack of access to healthcare, education and unemployment.

QECT Funded Projects
Organisation	Founder(s)	Country
Justice Defenders (formerly African Prisons Project)	Alexander Mclean	Uganda/Kenya
The Justice Desk	Jessica Dewhurst	South Africa
GirlDreamer	Amna Akhtar and Kiran Kaur	United Kingdom
Eco Brixs	Andy Bownds and Gee Elliott	Uganda
Uganda Marathon	Henry Blanchard	Uganda
Unloc / Acts of Gratitude	Hayden Taylor and Ben Dowling (Unloc) / Jean D’Amour Mutoni (AoG)	Rwanda
Hope for Children Cameroon	Joannes Yimbesalu	Cameroon
Nature Fun Ranch	Corey Lane	Barbados
iDebate	Jean Michel	Rwanda
Kisoboka	Stephen Katende	Uganda
MAYEIN	Edem Ossai	Nigeria
Boundless Minds	Benjamin Rukwengye	Uganda
Planet Green Africa	Mwayi Kampesi and Atu Kampesi	Malawi
RBA Initiative	Erick Venant	Tanzania
OneDay Health	Nicolas Laing	Uganda
WISE	Caroline Odera	Kenya
IYAN	Daniel Misaki	Uganda
Ukani Malawi	Temwa Chirembo and Modester Mangilani	Malawi

=== 2019 OYW Partnership ===
In 2019, The Queen's Commonwealth Trust partnered with One Young World (OYW) to offer QCT Scholarships to 53 leaders – one from every Commonwealth country – to attend the 2019 OYW Summit in London, UK from 22–25 October. One Young World is a preeminent global forum for young adults who have demonstrated a commitment to affecting positive change. The organisation received over 5,000 applications, out of which 53 were selected. The following list contains the 2019 QCTxOYW scholarship winners from the first cohort:

2019 QCTxOYW Winners
Name	Country
Felix Richard Manyogote	Tanzania
Glenn Marc Stein	South Africa
Marie Jeva Anael Bodwell	Seychelles
Siddhant Sarang	India
Costase Ndayishimiye	Rwanda
Kaene Disepo	Botswana
Kaveto Tjatjara	Namibia
Daniel Nyabadza	Mozambique
Hopolang Mathaba	Lesotho
Innocents Yeboah-Num	Ghana
Jacqueline Mutumba	Uganda
Melusi Simelane	Eswatini
Muhammed Touray	The Gambia
Matthew Lam Joar	Kenya
Noriah Tadala Katungwe	Malawi
Patu Ndango Fen	Cameroon
Samantha Miyanda	Zambia
Sandra Ajaja	Nigeria
Sarvesh Lutchmun	Mauritius
Yasmine Bilkis Ibrahim	Sierra Leone
Adeline Ng Kai Wen	Malaysia
Gulnahar Mahbub Monika	Bangladesh
Hafiz Usama Tanveer	Pakistan
Prabath Manaperuma	Sri Lanka
Queenie Chong	Brunei
Sebastian Hoe Wee Kiat	Singapore
Amanda Scott	Grenada
Benedict E.J Bryan	Trinidad and Tobago
Christaneisha Soleyn	Barbados
Dentrecia Blanchette	Saint Kitts and Nevis
Eber Ravariere	Dominica
Jasmine Duncan	Saint Lucia
Jason Ricketts	Jamaica
Jubilanté Cutting	Guyana
Kirkland McIntosh	Bahamas
Lance Copegog	Canada
Lezli McCulloch	Belize
Rickisha Terry	Antigua & Barbuda
Ruth Stowe	Saint Vincent and the Grenadines
Seutatia-ia-Noue	Samoa
Saia Mataele	Tonga
Rinesh Sharma	Fiji
Pania Newton	New Zealand
Millicent Barty	Solomon Islands
Megan Elaine Iha	Papua New Guinea
Lisepa Paeniu	Tuvalu
Lisa Rapley	Australia
George Quadina	Nauru
Cedric Paniel	Vanuatu
Maria Kola	Cyprus
Eman Borg	Gozo/Malta
Alice Sparks	United Kingdom
