= Royal and VIP Executive Committee =

UK Home Office security committee

The Royal and VIP Executive Committee (RAVEC), also called the Executive Committee for the Protection of Royalty and Public Figures, is a part of the UK Home Office providing advice and review of security and close protection of the British royal family and other notable public figures to the Home Secretary.

Members of the committee include representatives of the Home Office, the Foreign, Commonwealth and Development Office, the Cabinet Office and the Metropolitan Police, as well as the Royal Household. The current (as of 2025) terms of reference for the committee were agreed in 2021.

The committee was party to the long-running lawsuit over the security concerns of Charles III's younger son, Prince Harry, which he lost, although RAVEC has since agreed to provide risk assessments for his visits to the UK.

The Home Secretary, Shabana Mahmood, offered Nigel Farage, leader of Reform UK, a meeting with the chair of the committee after his party expressed concerns for his safety after the murder of former MP and Reform UK spokesperson Ann Widdecombe on 8 July 2026.
