= Royal Rota =

British royal family press pool

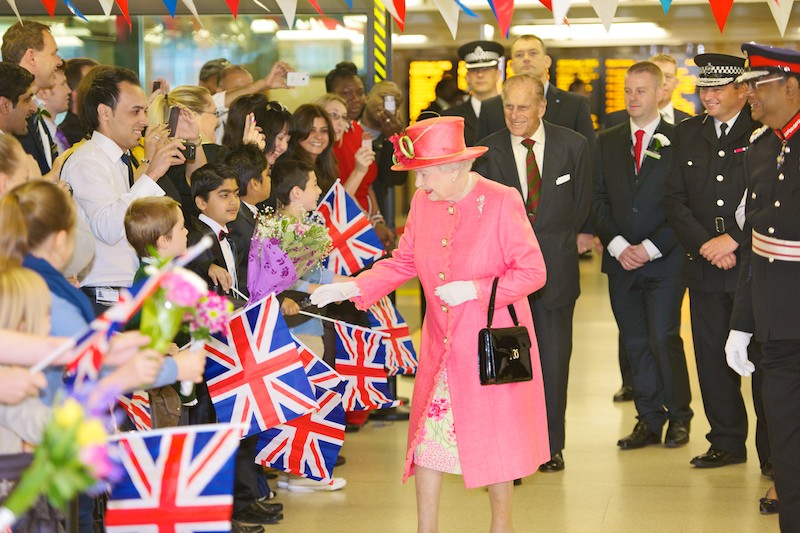
- Legal status: Professional organization
- Location: London, UK

The Royal Rota is the press pool that covers the British royal family. The Royal Rota is made up of a select group of media representatives that are invited to attend and report on royal events, with the understanding that the news and photographs taken at the event will be freely shared with other members of the media. This pool system decreases the number of media representatives that would otherwise attend, which helps to alleviate space and security concerns.

== History ==
The Royal Rota system was formally established more than 40 years ago, with roots traceable to the increasing media interest in the British monarchy during the late 20th century. Its development coincided with heightened public fascination, particularly during the era of Diana, Princess of Wales, whose popularity transformed royal coverage. Prior to formalized pooling, media access was more ad hoc; the rota provided a structured way to balance access, minimize disruption, and maximize distribution of content.

The system evolved from earlier practices of managing press at royal events and has been administered through industry bodies like the News Media Association for print media. It predates the digital transformation of news, including social media and instant global dissemination, which has led to ongoing debates about its relevance.

== Members ==
The Royal Rota includes journalism staff affiliated with the following professional organisations:

- News Media Association, which represents print journalism.
- Wire Picture Agency
- Council of Photographic News Agencies Limited
- Independent Photographers Association www.ipa.photos
- United Kingdom television broadcast networks, such as BBC, Sky News, and ITN

== Core members ==
As of January 2020, core members of the print media include the Daily Express, the Daily Mail, the Daily Mirror, the Evening Standard, The Telegraph, The Times and The Sun.

== See also ==
- Royal correspondent
- White House Correspondents' Association – The press pool for the White House
