= Omid Scobie =

British journalist and writer (born 1981)

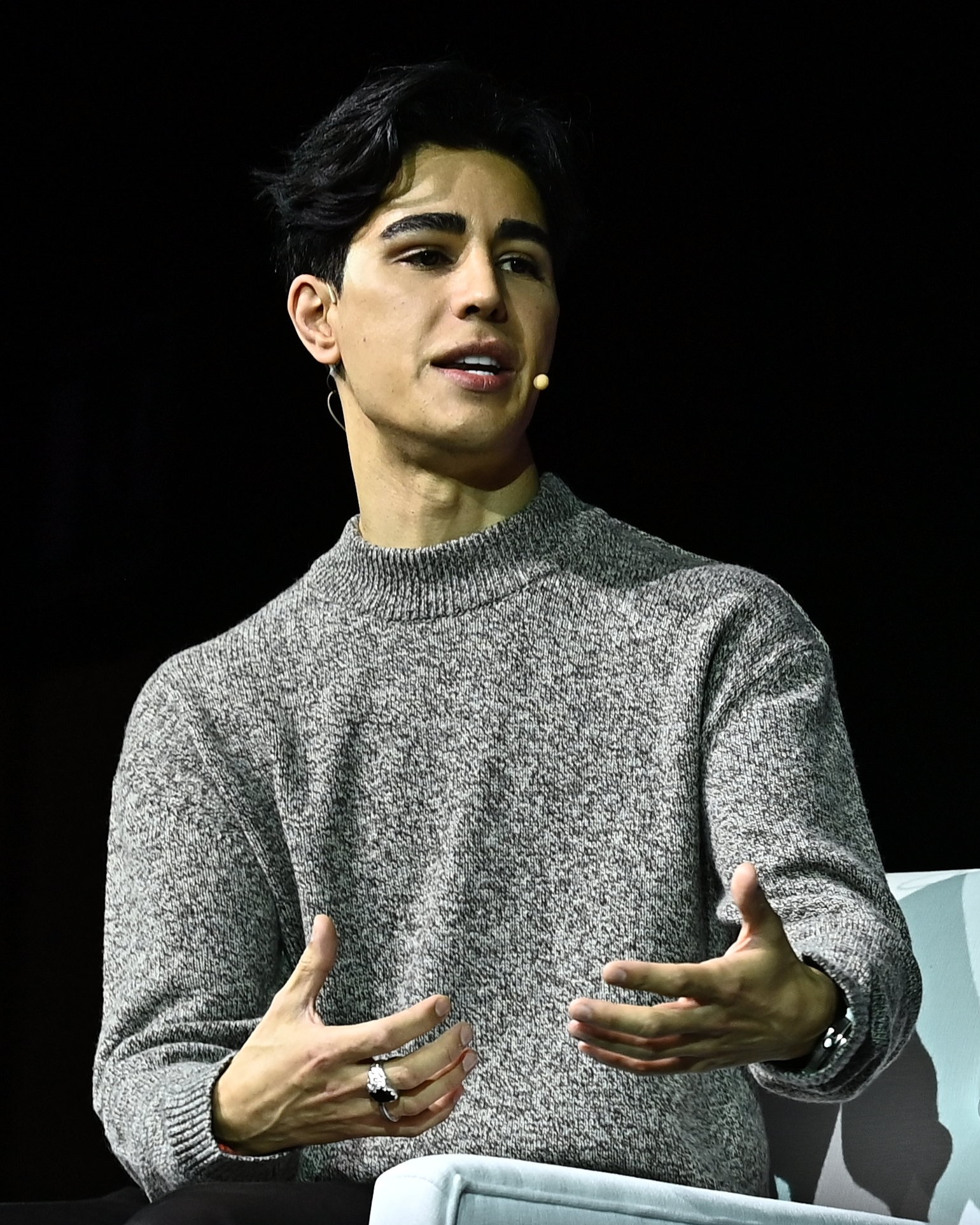
- Scobie in 2022
- Born: 4 July 1981 (age 45); Wales
- Education: London College of Communication
- Occupations: Journalist; non-fiction writer
- Writing career
- Subject: British royal family
- Notable works: Finding Freedom (2020); Endgame (2023)

Omid Scobie (born 4 July 1981) (Note: Scobie stated in an interview with Tatler that he was born on 4 July, and an article in The Times on 28 November 2023 stated that he was 42. This means that Scobie was born on 4 July 1981.) is a British journalist and writer best known as co-author of the book Finding Freedom and author of the book Endgame. Scobie's work focuses on the British royal family.

== Early life ==
Scobie was born in Wales and grew up in Oxford with his younger brother and parents, an Iranian social worker mother and a Scottish marketing director father. He attended Magdalen College School, a private school in Oxford, and then the sixth form at Cherwell School, also in Oxford. He went on to study journalism at the London College of Communication.

== Career ==
=== Reporting ===
After a brief stint on a British celebrity magazine, Scobie became the European bureau chief on the American celebrity and entertainment magazine Us Weekly, where he stayed for a decade. Part of his role was reporting on royals. He became royal editor-at-large at Harper's Bazaar and the royal contributor at ABC News, appearing regularly on Good Morning America and hosting the network's royal podcast, the HeirPod.

=== Author ===
In 2020, Scobie co-authored a book about Prince Harry, Duke of Sussex, and Meghan, Duchess of Sussex, with American journalist Carolyn Durand. Finding Freedom: Harry and Meghan and the Making of A Modern Royal Family was published in August 2020 by HarperCollins. The book was written with the Duchess's contribution through a third-party source. Within five days it had sold more than 31,000 copies in the United Kingdom and had secured the number one spot for hardback non-fiction on The Sunday Times bestseller list. In August 2021, a paperback edition of the book was released with a new epilogue covering events of the previous year, including Meghan and Harry's TV interview with Oprah Winfrey.

November 2023 saw the publication of Scobie's next book, Endgame, in which he aims criticism at the British royal family as an institution as well as at individual members of the family. BBC News's verdict on the book was that it covered familiar territory and felt somewhat dated. The reviewer said: "The Endgame of the title suggests an institution that's in serious trouble. But this won't be the book to sink it." The Dutch edition of Endgame was recalled after it included the names of King Charles III and Catherine, Princess of Wales as the two royals who were alleged to have asked questions about Harry and Meghan's future child's skin colour. In a TV interview on This Morning, Scobie said that he did not include the two names in his version of the book. He said that he had anticipated the "heated and controversial" public reaction to his book, and that he had been subjected to "unfair attacks" and "character assassination". A week later he wrote in the i that, unbeknownst to him at the time, a draft of Endgame that had not yet been cleared by lawyers and contained the names had been sent to the Dutch publisher so that work could be started on translation, on the understanding that the translation would be updated to reflect the final version of the book. The Dutch publisher Xander Uitgevers disagreed with Scobie's account, calling it "factually incorrect". In the United States the Endgame spent just one week on The New York Times hardback nonfiction bestseller list (at number 12), while in the United Kingdom it was reported to have sold 6,488 copies in its first five days, compared to 31,000 for Finding Freedom in its first five days.

== Personal life ==
As of 2023, Scobie was living in a rented house in the Hollywood Hills, having previously lived in East London. In an interview with The Times in November 2023, he said that he was "hopelessly single" with only his French Bulldog, Yoshi, for company.

Scobie once claimed in an interview to be six years younger than he really was, but in November 2023 he said: "I'm 42. I work in an industry where I'm surrounded by people who are, let's say, conservative with telling their age, particularly in television," adding that he had a "little insecurity" about turning 40.

== Bibliography ==
- Finding Freedom: Harry and Meghan and the Making of a Modern Royal Family (2020) ISBN 978-0063046108
- Endgame: Inside the Royal Family and the Monarchy's Fight for Survival (2023) ISBN 978-0063258662
- Royal Spin (2026) ISBN 978-0063424807
