= Princess Lilibet of Sussex =

British princess (born 2021)

Princess Lilibet
- Born: Lilibet Diana Mountbatten-Windsor; 4 June 2021 (age 5); Santa Barbara Cottage Hospital, Santa Barbara, California, US
- House: Windsor
- Father: Prince Harry, Duke of Sussex
- Mother: Meghan Markle

Princess Lilibet of Sussex (Lilibet Diana Mountbatten-Windsor; born 4 June 2021) is an American-born member of the British royal family. She is the daughter of Prince Harry, Duke of Sussex, and Meghan, Duchess of Sussex. She is a granddaughter of King Charles III and is seventh in the line of succession to the British throne.

== Birth and family ==
Lilibet was born at 11:40 PDT (18:40 UTC) on 4 June 2021 at Santa Barbara Cottage Hospital in Santa Barbara, California. She is the second child of Prince Harry, Duke of Sussex, and Meghan, Duchess of Sussex, and has an older brother, Prince Archie. Her birth and name were announced two days later. She was named after her paternal great-grandmother Queen Elizabeth II, who was called "Lilibet" by her family, and her paternal grandmother, Diana, Princess of Wales. Her nickname is "Lili". She has mixed-race ancestry, with African and European maternal lineage, and holds dual citizenship of the United States and the United Kingdom. In December 2021, the first photograph of Lilibet was released to the public as a Christmas card from her parents. She is seventh in the line of succession to the British throne.

Lilibet met her great-grandmother Queen Elizabeth II and her paternal grandfather, Prince Charles (later King Charles III) in person for the first time when the family travelled to London for Elizabeth II's Platinum Jubilee in June 2022. She was christened Lilibet Diana Mountbatten-Windsor in the Episcopal Church, a province of the Anglican Communion, in a private service at her parents' home on 3 March 2023 by John H. Taylor, the bishop of Los Angeles. Her godfather is the American actor and comedian Tyler Perry.

Lilibet and her family primarily resided in Montecito, California, as her parents had relocated to the United States from the UK in 2020. In July 2026, she travelled to the UK with her parents and brother, where they met with her grandfather, King Charles III, and Queen Camilla at Highgrove House. In August 2026, the family relocated to the UK, with Lilibet and Archie enrolled to begin school there in September. In September, they changed schools after two days, following concerns from the family's security team about transport between their home and the original school.

== Title and styles ==
Following the death of Elizabeth II and accession of Charles III on 8 September 2022, Lilibet became entitled to use the title "princess" and the style "Royal Highness" as the child of a son of the monarch, pursuant to letters patent issued by King George V in 1917. A statement on 8 March 2023 by a spokesperson for her parents confirming her baptism days earlier marked the first time they had publicly used her title, referring to her as "Princess Lilibet Diana". The official website of the royal family was updated on 9 March to refer to her as "Princess Lilibet of Sussex" on 9 March. Lilibet will use titles in formal settings but not in everyday conversations.

== See also ==
- Family tree of the British royal family
- List of current British princes and princesses

Princess Lilibet of Sussex House of Windsor Born: 4 June 2021
Lines of succession
| Preceded by Prince Archie of Sussex | Succession to the British throne 7th in line | Followed by Andrew Mountbatten-Windsor |
Orders of precedence in the United Kingdom
| Preceded by Princess Charlotte of Wales | Ladies; Princess Lilibet of Sussex | Followed by The Duchess of Edinburgh |
