= Family of Meghan, Duchess of Sussex =

Markle and Ragland families

Family of the Duchess of Sussex
- The arms attributed to the Merckel family in Alsace, blazoned in English Azure a feather bendwise between two fleurs de lys Or. Thomas Markle's forefather was Heinrich Martin Merckel, who emigrated to the United States from the Alsatian town of Lampertsloch
- Earlier spellings: Merckel
- Origin: United States
- Members: The Duchess of Sussex; Thomas Markle Sr. Doria Ragland
- Connected families: House of Windsor (British royal family)

Members of the Markle and Ragland families have been related by marriage to the British royal family since the wedding of Meghan Markle and Prince Harry in May 2018, when she became the Duchess of Sussex. The couple has two children, Prince Archie and Princess Lilibet. The Markle (formerly spelled Merckel) family is of Pennsylvania Dutch descent and originates in Alsace on the modern French–German border, and Meghan's paternal ancestors moved to the United States in the 17th century; among her father's other ancestors are American settlers of English, Dutch, and Irish descent. The Ragland family is of African American descent.

== Parents of the Duchess of Sussex ==
=== Thomas Markle Sr. ===
Thomas Wayne Markle Sr. is the father of the Duchess of Sussex. He is a retired American television lighting director, born in 1944. Markle was raised in Newport, Pennsylvania, the son of Doris May Rita (née Sanders; 1920–2011) and Gordon Arnold Markle (1918–1979). His mother's family was from New Hampshire. His family is of German, English and Irish descent. He has two brothers, Michael (1939–2021) and Frederick (also known as Dismas F. Markle; born 1942). He was previously married to Roslyn Markle (née Loveless; died 2024), with whom he had Thomas Markle Jr. and Samantha Markle (born Yvonne Marie Markle). He was a co-recipient of two Daytime Emmy Awards for work on the television medical drama General Hospital (in 1982 and 2011) and received a Chicago / Midwest Emmy Award for work on the television program Made in Chicago (in 1975). He also won $750,000 in the California State Lottery in 1990, although he later declared personal bankruptcy (in 2016). He had planned to walk Meghan down the aisle for her wedding, but did not. He said his absence was due to his health problems, as he was recovering from a heart attack and had undergone heart surgery. He resided in Rosarito Beach, Baja California, Mexico, before moving to Cebu, Philippines, in 2025. In May 2026, he returned to the U.S. for ongoing medical care after leg amputation. In November of the same year, he was charged with one count of possession of child pornography and placed under house arrest.

=== Doria Ragland ===
Doria Loyce Ragland (formerly Markle) is the mother of the Duchess of Sussex and is of African American descent. She was born in 1956 to Jeanette Arnold (1929–2000) and her second husband Alvin Ragland (1929–2011). She has two older maternal half-siblings, Joseph (known as "JJ"; 1949–2021) and Saundra Johnson (born 1952), and a younger paternal half-brother, Joffrey Ragland. She was a makeup artist when she met Meghan's father, and later worked as a travel agent. In the early to mid 2000s, she was a small business owner, operating a boutique out of a rented space in a strip mall before filing for bankruptcy and choosing to pursue her education. She firstly completed a Bachelor of Arts in Psychology and worked as an Associate Clinical Social Worker (ASW) after postgraduate studies. She later earned a Master of Social Work degree from the University of Southern California, which she completed in 2011. In May 2018, a few days before the royal wedding, she resigned from her position at a mental health clinic to enter private practice working with elderly patients. She has a close relationship with her daughter and was the only member of the Duchess's family who went to the wedding.

== Siblings of the Duchess of Sussex ==
=== Samantha Markle ===
Samantha Markle, also known as Samantha Grant (born Yvonne Marie Markle), is the older paternal half-sister of the Duchess of Sussex, and the daughter of Thomas Markle Sr. and Roslyn Markle (née Loveless). She was born on 24 November 1964 and as of 2018 was living in Belleview, Florida with her then-boyfriend Mark Phillips. She suffered injuries after a fall from a rope swing that caused paralysis on her left side and blindness in one eye. She was diagnosed with multiple sclerosis in 2008 and has been using a wheelchair since then. She attained a master's degree in mental health and vocational rehabilitation counseling in 2008, and worked as a mental health counselor.

Markle has been divorced twice and has been through personal bankruptcy. She has three children: Ashleigh and Christopher Hale with her first husband Earl Hale, and Noelle Rasmussen with her second husband Scott Rasmussen (div. 2003). Ashleigh and Christopher were raised and later adopted by their paternal grandparents. Markle is reported to have strained relationships with her children, her mother, and her half-sister, the Duchess of Sussex. She maintains that the last time she spoke to Meghan was "2014, almost 2015". At the time of the royal wedding, she and Meghan were not on speaking terms. She was not invited to the wedding of Prince Harry and her half-sister and had not attended her half-sister's first wedding either, though invited. She appeared on the TLC special program When Harry Met Meghan: A Royal Engagement to discuss her half-sister and her upcoming book, The Diary of Princess Pushy's Sister. In October 2017, Markle insisted that it will not be a tell-all book, but will merely be about "some of the beautiful nuances of our lives". In an interview with The Sun, Markle called her half-sister a "shallow social climber" whose behavior was not "befitting of a royal family member".

In May 2018, Markle told the media that she had suffered a broken ankle and fractured knee after her boyfriend crashed a car into a concrete barrier while driving with her and trying to avoid being photographed by a member of the paparazzi, although Florida police said no report of such an incident had been filed and they had "no evidence" that it had taken place. Since the royal wedding, Markle has habitually criticized her half-sister and brother-in-law on Twitter. When asked whether she was making money through speaking out about her relatives, Markle replied: "I've worked in media most of my life and in broadcasting. So because my sister is suddenly royal isn't grounds for me to stop doing all of that." Samantha has promoted conspiracy theories about Meghan, including claims that she faked her pregnancies and that her children were born to a surrogate.

In late 2018, the media reported that Markle had been placed on a watch list maintained by the Fixated Threat Assessment Centre of persons exhibiting signs of obsession with members of the Royal Family. Markle responded to the news by denying that she was obsessed with the Duchess of Sussex and tweeting that the purported listing was "a British media attempt at silencing me". In August 2019, her Twitter account was suspended. Later in October, it was reported that she was under investigation by the Polk County Sheriff's Department following multiple allegations of cyberbullying. The first part of Markle's memoir, titled The Diary of Princess Pushy's Sister Part 1, was published in 2021. In 2023, she along with her father and brother took part in a special 7NEWS Spotlight interview, called The Markles.

==== Lawsuit ====
In March 2022, Samantha sued Meghan by filing a defamation lawsuit in Florida, accusing her of lying in her Oprah interview and seeking damages in excess of $75,000. She accused Meghan of making "demonstrably false and malicious statements" which subjected her to "humiliation, shame and hatred on a worldwide scale," as well as damaging their father's reputation to fabricate a "rags to royalty" narrative. Meghan's lawyers described the lawsuit as "a continuation of a pattern of disturbing behavior." In a response filed in May 2022, Meghan's attorneys argued that her half-sister's claims were "demonstrably false", and the statements made by Meghan during the Oprah interview were either "non-actionable opinion or substantially true". In June 2022, Meghan's initial motion to dismiss the case was rejected by a judge following amendments made by Samantha in her complaints. She filed a second motion in the same month, stating that the deletion of "numerous specific factual allegations and exhibits from her original complaint" combined with the lack of facts had undermined Samantha's case, and argued a judge or jury would not be able to pass judgements about the state of their relationship. Meghan's lawyers have argued that her comments regarding her upbringing in the interview were unfalsifiable and subjective statements of her feelings, rather than objective facts.

In February 2023, legal documents made available by the Florida district court revealed that Samantha wanted both Meghan and Harry to give depositions under oath. She also asked Meghan to make 38 separate admissions in the case, and called upon their father, her daughter Ashleigh Hale, Meghan and Harry's former communications secretary Jason Knauf, and Christopher Bouzy to give statements. Meghan's legal team described Samantha's requests as "irrelevant", "vague", and "speculative", and argued the proposed deponents had "no discernible connection" to the core issue laid out in the original complaint. In addition to applying for the case to be dismissed, Meghan's lawyer also applied for the discovery process to be delayed, pending the outcome of the dismissal application. Judge Charlene Edwards Honeywell later denied the application to halt the discovery process and moved the deadline for submitting depositions to July 2023. Honeywell dismissed the lawsuit in March 2023. In April 2023, Samantha refiled the lawsuit with another amended complaint that covered statements made by Meghan in her Netflix docuseries as well. The lawsuit was later dismissed with prejudice in March 2024, after a judge ruled that the claimant was unable to provide evidence of defamation. Samantha later appealed the decision.

=== Thomas Markle Jr. ===
Thomas Wayne Markle Jr. (also known as Tom) is the older paternal half-brother of the Duchess of Sussex, and the son of Thomas Markle Sr. and Roslyn Markle (née Loveless). He was born on 17 September 1966, and as of 2018 lived in Grants Pass, Oregon, with his fiancée Darlene Blount. He was married to Tracy Dooley until their divorce in 2001 and then to Johannes Rawha until their divorce in 2009. He and Tracy Dooley have two sons, Thomas and Tyler Dooley. He worked as a window fitter. He was arrested in January 2017 after threateningly holding a gun to Blount's head during an argument while he was under the influence of alcohol. Later in 2018, following another incident, Blount claimed in a police call that "Markle was beating himself up" and "drinking", saying that he "was not mentally fit". Blount was arrested by the police on assault charges, but was later released. The couple was involved in another domestic violence incident in July 2018 after which Blount was arrested again and released "after posting bail".

Thomas Markle Jr. was not invited to the wedding of Prince Harry and his half-sister, and at the time of the wedding, he had not seen her for about seven years. In an interview with the Daily Mirror in April 2018, Markle called his half-sister a "phony" who had "turned into a different person" and "forgotten her roots and her family" since becoming famous. He then sent Prince Harry a letter, asking him to call off the wedding – saying the forthcoming wedding would be "the biggest mistake in Royal Wedding History", criticizing his half-sister's treatment of Thomas Markle Sr. by saying she had been "using her own father until he's bankrupt", and calling her "a jaded, shallow, conceited woman". However, Markle later wrote another letter in which he told his half-sister he was "sorry for venting my frustrations" after not being invited to the wedding and that he was "very proud" of her and wanted her "to have a great wedding and a long future with Prince Harry". After their father's relationship with Meghan soured following his multiple paid interviews, Markle Jr. said on Daily Mirror that "she is abusing his love for her, ... It's selfish, cruel even".

In 2021, Markle Jr. was one of the celebrity contestants in the Australian reality television series Big Brother VIP. In 2023, he along with his father and sister took part in a special 7NEWS Spotlight interview, called The Markles. In 2025, he moved with his father to Cebu, Philippines. Following his discovery of child sexual abuse material allegedly belonging to his father and his subsequent report to authorities, Markle Jr. publicly apologised to his half-sister, Meghan, for siding with "the wrong person". It was later reported that Thomas Markle Jr. had himself been named a "person of interest" in the Philippine authorities' investigation into the allegations against his father. The Philippine's interior and local government secretary, Jonvic Remulla, said that there were "signs that point that the son is involved in the crime as well", but he added that Markle Jr. was not yet being treated as a suspect. His alleged involvement was not thought to be directly connected to the material he had handed over to the police. Later in the same month it was reported that Philippine police had apologised to Markle Jr. after their inquiries into his alleged involvement were reportedly resolved. The investigation had reportedly been extended to include Markle Jr. after police had received witness statements alleging that underage girls had been brought to Markle Jr.'s home in Cordova, Cebu, with ring lights, through the windows. Police reportedly interviewed his fiancée, Rose Ann Gabuya, and members of his wider circle before resolving the matter.

== Other relatives of the Duchess of Sussex ==
=== Thomas Dooley ===
Thomas Markle III, known as Thomas Dooley, is a half-nephew of the Duchess of Sussex, the son of her half-brother Thomas and his ex-wife Tracy Dooley. In September 2019, Dooley was arrested in Hollywood, Los Angeles, after allegedly walking through the streets wearing only a small towel wrapped around his waist while shouting gibberish. According to reports, a witness contacted police, who arrived at the scene and attempted to approach Dooley, who reportedly tried to walk away and resisted their attempts to detain him. He was charged with felony resisting arrest and held on bail.

=== Tyler Dooley ===
Tyler Scott Markle (born July 15, 1992), known professionally as Tyler Dooley, is a half-nephew of the Duchess of Sussex, the son of her half-brother Thomas and his ex-wife Tracy Dooley. He was born in Los Angeles, California, and co-owns a legal cannabis business with his mother. He created a cannabis product called "Markle Sparkle", reportedly to honor his aunt for her marriage to Prince Harry. In an interview with Inside Edition, he released a video of him being held by the now Duchess of Sussex as a child.

Dooley appeared in the MTV International television show The Royal World as the only American cast member. The show featured cast members at a country estate where they were to be treated like royalty. It premiered on November 7, 2018. As of 2018, Dooley lives in Oregon.

=== Ashleigh Hale ===
Ashleigh Hale (born c. 1985) is the half-niece of the Duchess of Sussex, the elder daughter of her half-sister Samantha. She was adopted and raised by her paternal grandparents. In 2007, she connected with Meghan. She completed a bachelor's degree at Hollins University from 2003 to 2007. She earned a J.D. from the Charleston School of Law in 2010 and a Master of Laws from the George Washington University Law School in 2011. As of 2022, she is an immigration lawyer and an associate at Fragomen law firm in San Francisco.

In 2022, Hale's relationship with the Duchess was included as part of the Harry & Meghan docuseries.

=== Noelle Rasmussen ===
Noelle Rasmussen is the half-niece of the Duchess of Sussex, the younger daughter of Samantha Markle and Scott Rasmussen. She grew up in Albuquerque, New Mexico, where she continues to reside. She was close to her grandmother, Roslyn Loveless. Loveless wrote to the Child Protective Services requesting that Rasmussen be removed from her mother's care when she was 16. Rasmussen has alleged that she experienced emotional and physical abuse at the hands of her mother, claims which Samantha has denied. In 2017, Rasmussen was reported to be studying anthropology, although little is publicly known about her subsequent education or professional career.

In October 2026, Rasmussen spoke publicly about allegations that her grandfather possessed child sexual abuse material and had committed sexual offences against minors, which he denied. In an interview with The Telegraph, she said the allegations were "not a surprise" and reflected on having sensed that something was wrong during her limited childhood interactions with him. Rasmussen has publicly supported her aunt Meghan's decision to keep her children away from their maternal grandfather.

== Ancestry of Thomas Markle Sr. and Doria Ragland ==
Thomas Markle is descended from German, Dutch, English, and Irish immigrants. His forefather Heinrich Martin Merckel emigrated to the United States from Lampertsloch, a historically German-speaking town in modern-day France near the French–German border, and later changed the spelling of his name to Markle. Among Meghan's ancestors is her paternal great-great-great-grandmother, New Hampshire landowner Mary Hussey Smith (died 1908), herself a descendant of an American colonial family whose line can be traced to Captain Christopher Hussey (died 1686), a founder of Nantucket, Massachusetts. Other distant ancestors include King Robert I of Scotland, Sir Philip Wentworth and his wife, Mary Clifford, daughter of John Clifford, 7th Baron de Clifford, and a descendant of King Edward III of England.

Doria Ragland is descended from African American enslaved persons in Georgia. Various contemporary records state that the Ragland name came from slave-owner William Ragland, a Methodist planter and land speculator who had emigrated during the eighteenth century from Cornwall, England to North America, settling successively in Virginia, North Carolina and Georgia. Doria Ragland's first identifiable African American Ragland ancestor was Richard Ragland (her great-great-great-great-grandfather), born into slavery in Chatham County, North Carolina c.1792; his son, Stephen Ragland (c.1848-1926)—Doria's great-great-great-grandfather— died a free man in Paulding County, Georgia, after the abolition of slavery in 1865.
