= Harry & Meghan =

Documentary series on the Duke and Duchess of Sussex

- Promotional poster
- Genre: Documentary series
- Directed by: Liz Garbus; Erica Sashin (episode 6)
- Starring: Prince Harry, Duke of Sussex; Meghan, Duchess of Sussex
- Composer: Gil Talmi
- Country of origin: United States
- Original language: English
- No. of episodes: 6

Production
- Executive producers: Erica Sashin; Mark Monroe; Dan Cogan; Liz Garbus; Ben Browning; Chanel Pysnik; Jon Bardin; Mala Chapple; Angus Wall
- Producers: Molly Raskin; Erin Barnett; Giona Jefferson; Elyssa Hess
- Editors: Mikaela Shwer; Lindy Jankura; Colin Cosack; Shilpi Gupta; Anne Barliant; Virginie Danglades; Anna Auster
- Running time: 55–60 min
- Production companies: Archewell Productions; Story Syndicate; Diamond Docs

Original release
- Network: Netflix
- Release: December 8 – December 15, 2022

Harry & Meghan is an American documentary series streaming on Netflix, starring Prince Harry, Duke of Sussex and Meghan, Duchess of Sussex. The series has six parts and covers the couple's relationship from their early courtship to their decision to step back as working members of the British royal family and their subsequent activities. It also includes interviews with family, friends, historians, and journalists.

The series was released in two volumes: three, one-hour episodes on December 8, 2022; and three more, one week later on December 15. It received mixed reviews from critics. According to BARB, it was the most-watched premiere for a Netflix show in 2022 in the United Kingdom. It holds the record for the biggest debut for a Netflix documentary with a total 81.6 million hours watched on its first four days of release, amounting to more than 28.7 million households.

== Production ==
In September 2020, the Duke and Duchess of Sussex signed a private commercial deal with Netflix "to develop scripted and unscripted series, film, documentaries, and children programming for the streaming service". Garrett Bradley was initially attached to the project as director, but reportedly left due to differences of opinion with the couple. Lana Wilson was also considered by Netflix as another possible director though she was never formally attached to the project. All interviews featured in the docuseries were completed by August 2022.

In an interview published in October 2022, Meghan announced that she and Harry were working on a docuseries focused on their life, directed by Liz Garbus. Garbus had been recruited for the project in 2021 by Chanel Pysnik, head of unscripted for Archewell Productions. Garbus had previously worked with Meghan on the development of a children's show. As of October 2022, Netflix had not confirmed the release of any documentaries by Harry and Meghan, and the release date for the docuseries was reportedly pushed back following the negative reaction to the fifth season of Netflix's The Crown. Meghan said of the docuseries that it was "... nice to be able to trust someone with our story" and described Garbus as a "seasoned director whose work I've long admired". Meghan conceded that allowing Garbus to direct meant that the series "may not be the way we would have told it. But that's not why we're telling it. We're trusting our story to someone else, and that means it will go through their lens". In response to the question of whether they reached out to the British press to get their side of the story, Garbus said the idea was "a nonstarter" as they were trying to keep the project "under wraps".

On December 1, 2022, the title of the docuseries was announced as Harry & Meghan. Despite initial assumptions that the docuseries had been partially filmed at the couple's Montecito home, it was later reported that the couple sat down for their interviews at 888 Lilac Drive, another mansion in Montecito.

== Cast ==
=== Starring ===
- Prince Harry, Duke of Sussex
- Meghan, Duchess of Sussex

=== Notable cameos ===
- Doria Ragland, Meghan's mother
- Ashleigh Hale, Meghan's niece
- Afua Hirsch, British writer and broadcaster
- David Olusoga, British historian and writer
- Kehinde Andrews, British Black studies academic
- Silver Tree, American writer, producer and director
- Abigail Spencer, American actress
- Jill Smoller, American sports agent and former professional tennis player
- Serena Williams, American professional tennis player
- Misan Harriman, Nigerian-born British photographer and entrepreneur
- Nacho Figueras, Argentine polo player and model
- Prince Seeiso of Lesotho
- Tyler Perry, American actor and comedian
- Christopher Bouzy, American tech entrepreneur

== Episodes ==
No.	Title	Directed by	Original release date
Volume 1
1	"Episode 1"	Liz Garbus	December 8, 2022
Harry and Meghan share information about the early days of their romance, detailing out their first date and revealing their exchanges via email, their personal nicknames, and photos and footage from their one-week visit to Botswana. They also discuss details about the night before their relationship was made public, during which they attended a Halloween party with Princess Eugenie and Jack Brooksbank. Harry also talks about the impact his mother's death has had on his life and on his relationship with the paparazzi and the press, and draws comparison between her experience and the treatment received by Meghan. Commenting on his mother's 1995 interview, he said he believed his mother was "deceived into giving the interview" but spoke "the truth of her experience". He describes his childhood as being "filled with laughter, filled with happiness and filled with adventure," but states that he had "little help or guidance" after his mother's death. He further discusses his relationship with his other girlfriends and the public pressures put on female members of the royal family, adding that men within the family chose "to marry someone who would fit the mould as opposed to somebody who you perhaps are destined to be with." Harry and Meghan's children, Archie and Lilibet, also appear in the episode.
2	"Episode 2"	Liz Garbus	December 8, 2022
Doria Ragland sits down for her first public interview since her daughter Meghan and Harry started their relationship. She discusses her daughter's childhood, accompanied by images that show the two together. Harry, referring to headlines such as "(Almost) Straight Outta Compton", claims that at the start of their relationship members of the royal family were wondering why Meghan should be treated differently from other women who married into the family and were harassed by the press and their advice was not to say anything, though he points out the difference between their experience and hers to be "the race element." Meghan reflects on an incident from her childhood when a stranger shouted the N-word at her mother. There are also discussions on Brexit and its impact on the British society. The couple also discusses their experience when their respective parents went through divorce. Meghan details out her surprise at the formality within the royal family, adding that it was not only on the outside but "carried through on the inside." She described herself as a hugger, which she said could be "really jarring for a lot of Brits." The couple also shares details about the night they became engaged, and Harry's proposal at Kensington Palace.
3	"Episode 3"	Liz Garbus	December 8, 2022
Harry and Meghan discuss their engagement interview, which she describes as a "structured reality show" that was "rehearsed". The couple, as well as Meghan's mother, further discuss their relationship with the media and paparazzi after the couple's romance was made public. There are also discussions on racism in the history of the British Empire. Harry reflects on the moment he was wearing a Nazi uniform at a Halloween party during his youth, something he describes as "one of the biggest mistakes of his life". Harry also discusses the existence of a huge level of unconscious bias in the royal family which he claims contributes to its problems, giving Princess Michael of Kent wearing a blackamoor brooch as an example. Meghan explores her relationship with her father Thomas Markle and her paternal side of the family. She mentions that she has not been in touch with her half-sister Samantha Markle for over a decade but is close to Samantha's daughter, Ashleigh Hale. Meghan stated that Hale could not be invited to her wedding in 2018 as advisors thought it would not have been appropriate to invite her but not Samantha. Meghan also talks about her father Thomas staging paparazzi shots before the nuptials.
Volume 2
4	"Episode 4"	Liz Garbus	December 15, 2022
The episode starts by covering the couple's wedding day. The couple talks about their struggles in their first residence Nottingham Cottage, which they said was too small. Meghan reflects on her first official engagement with Queen Elizabeth II and then discusses her own role in organizing a fundraiser for survivors of the Grenfell Tower fire. Harry stated there was resentment in the royal family at the popularity of Meghan during their tour of Australia, New Zealand and Fiji. The episode also compares the coverage received by Meghan and her sister-in-law Catherine during their respective pregnancies. Meghan also discusses her suicidal thoughts and how she was allegedly not allowed to get help. Harry stated the communications offices at the palace work against each other. He talks about his disappointment "to see [his] brother's office copy the very same thing" his father Charles once did. He also talks about their decision not to serve "[their] child up on a platter" by appearing in front of a hospital after he was born. The couple also discusses their tour of Southern Africa, and how Meghan did not expect a part when she was asked about her mental health be used in an ITV documentary.
5	"Episode 5"	Liz Garbus	December 15, 2022
Harry stated the palace's advice was not to take legal action once Meghan's letter to her father was published by The Mail on Sunday, but they filed a lawsuit after seeking independent legal advice. Meghan's lawyer claims there were "negative briefings" from the palace to "suit other people's agendas". Harry talks about their decision to go to Vancouver Island after talks with his father as they could have more privacy there. The couple also talks about the palace's alleged attempts to block Harry from seeing the Queen in person, and he emphasizes his grandmother was not blindsided as by December 2019 their plans to leave were in the making for a minimum of two years. Harry discusses the leaking of a letter he had sent to his father, which mentioned he and Meghan were willing to relinquish [their] Sussex titles. Harry then alleges that his brother William screamed and shouted at him at the Sandringham Summit, while his father said "things that were just simply untrue" and the Queen remained silent. Harry stated that a statement put out on his and his brother's behalf after the meeting, which denied tensions between them, was released without his permission. He emphasizes that the decision to leave was his, not Meghan's. They also suggest that Meghan's half-sister could have been involved in some of the online abuse directed at her. Meghan talks about the death threats she received as a result of hateful content spread on social media platforms.
6	"Episode 6"	Liz Garbus & Erica Sashin	December 15, 2022
Tyler Perry talks about how he assisted Harry and Meghan upon their arrival in the U.S. as he offered them somewhere to stay for six weeks, while the royal family still thought they were in Canada. As non-working royals, they no longer had state-funded security. Meghan mentions MailOnline's attempts during the litigation to get access to all text messages on her phone. They also talk about how a group of Meghan's friends, allegedly without her authorization, talked about her letter to her father in a People magazine article before it was published by the Mail. Harry blames Meghan's miscarriage on the actions of the Mail due to the stress they caused. The couple discusses their 2021 interview with Oprah Winfrey, which Meghan says had been a long time in the making. There is also a mention of an investigation into allegations of bullying against Meghan. Meghan confesses that she thought the biggest takeaway from the interview would be about her mental health struggles, but instead it turned into a conversation about race. Harry describes his grandfather Prince Philip as "a man of service, honour and great humour", and said returning to the UK for his funeral was hard because of his family's attitude. The documentary also discusses Jason Knauf's witness statement during Meghan's court case against the Mail, who is the former aide to Harry and his brother William.

== Reception ==
=== Audience viewership ===
The series has received the highest UK viewing ratings for any Netflix show in 2022. According to BARB, its first episode recorded 2.4 million views during its first day on Netflix. This figure not only marks the biggest one-day audience for any Netflix show since BARB began monitoring the streaming service in October 2022, but it is also over double the viewership of The Crown's first episode of its fifth season (1.1 million). The second episode had 1.5 million streams, while the third installment managed 800,000. The docuseries holds the record for the biggest debut for a Netflix documentary with a total 81.6 million hours watched on its first four days of availability, amounting to more than 28 million households. It was watched for 97.7 million hours between December 12–18, during which its second volume became available. The show amassed 1.27 billion minutes of viewing time in the United States during its premiere week, followed by 1.69 billion minutes for the week of December 12–18. It ranked fourth on Nielsen's weekly streaming rankings during its first week before rising to the second position in the following week. In January 2023, the series was announced as Netflix's second-highest ranked documentary ever.

=== Critical response ===
The review aggregator website Rotten Tomatoes reported a 45% approval rating with an average rating of 5.7/10, based on 31 critic reviews. The website's critics consensus reads, "While Harry & Meghan is one of the most intimate glimpses yet into the famous couple, this overlong docuseries offers more overexposure than genuine illumination." Metacritic, which uses a weighted average, assigned a score of 56 out of 100 based on 12 critics, indicating "mixed or average reviews".

Zach Schonfeld, writing in The Guardian about the way controversial documentaries about celebrities were increasingly being suppressed in favour of dull, sanitised, authorised versions, said "Netflix's Harry & Meghan, a six-hour exercise in brand management, made with their own production company, may represent the nadir. As Edelman put it, viewers are 'being served slop'."

==== Volume I ====
Upon the release of its first volume, the series received mixed reviews from critics in the United States and the United Kingdom. Writing for The Guardian, Lucy Mangan liked the sweet moments between the couple and their children "being charming and funny together", but added that the audience is left with "exactly the same story we always knew, told in the way we would expect to hear it from the people who are telling it." In her review for The Independent, Jessie Thompson described the series as "intimate, self-aggrandizing, and wildly entertaining", but found the couple's expression of love for one another frustrating, while questioning some of the claims made with regards to their lack of knowledge of royal protocol: "Did Meghan really think it was 'a joke' that she had to curtsy to the Queen of England? It might be an outdated request, but it surely can't have been an unexpected one." Camilla Tominey of The Daily Telegraph described the documentary as an "unashamedly one-sided story" and "a completely partisan and overly dramatic interpretation of real life events" which "used slick propaganda, thinly-veiled jibes and a Sussex squad of loyal troops to do battle against bigoted Britain and its racist press."

Henry Mance of the Financial Times was critical of the show's pace, stating "This is a show that makes you grateful that the streaming platform has the option to watch at 1.25x speed." He also added that compared to past appearances by members of the royal family on television, the show was lacking any interesting content. Writing for The Times, Carol Midgley believed the show was "beautifully shot but it was repetitive, whingy and boring." In her review for Deadline, Stephanie Bunbury found the series lacking in terms of interesting content, saying that the audience would be "feeling shortchanged by Volume I." Writing for Variety, Daniel D'Addario believed the series suffered from "a sort of narrative stuckness, an inability or lack of desire to find the next thing to say that we haven't yet heard." He added that "speaking in their own voice about issues other than their personal experience would have represented a good start." In a review for CNN, Peggy Drexler wrote that the couple was "less interested in staying out of the spotlight than in staying in complete control of how that spotlight makes them look," and added that "the documentary strives to portray them as 'more grounded' than the rest of the royal family. In reality, they may be the most out of touch of them all." Writing for Fox News, Neil Sean was critical of the inconsistencies within the "boring" docuseries: "Even how they first met has radically changed like so many inconsistencies in the dire podcast she hosted, which took years to make."

==== Volume II ====
The second volume also received mixed reviews from critics. Writing for The Independent, Jessie Thompson described the second volume as "an almost unendurable three additional hours of grudge-rehashing." While acknowledging their difficulties with the press, she believed "their Netflix show gives the impression of a narcissistic, curiously thin-skinned pair" that are "trapped in a royal soap opera of their own creation – feeding the exact beast they so longed to escape from." In her review for the i, Emily Baker wrote that the series contained "cringey (but admittedly sweet) stories of their self-described 'fairy tale'" that were aimed at "painting Meghan as a victim of both the tabloids' venom and the royal family (or rather, their PR teams)." She argued that the viewer could sympathize with their views but "we would all do well (Harry and Meghan included) to close the entire book." Leila Latif of The Guardian believed the series did not "really provide much in terms of new information," but it "still lands a punch because there are so many unlikely twists." The BBC writer Katie Razzall called the series "heavily one-sided and selective," additionally stating that the couple might still have wanted "to battle royal institutions and the media," but that it might "turn out that their real battle" would be "with ongoing relevancy."

In her review for The Times, Carol Midgley stated that Harry "casts his brother as ego-driven and his father as a liar in this narcissistic exercise." She noted that the couple gave "a persuasive account of how they felt attacked and bullied by sections of the media and certain palace aides," and advised her readers to "ditch the first four hours (boring!) and just watch the last two" as "two wealthy adults frame their lives like a fairytale in the style of a soppy Tui advert." Writing for The Guardian, Stuart Heritage jokingly pointed out the documentary's effort to paint Prince William as the villain: "When Megxit was announced, William apparently 'screamed' at Harry. William put out a joint statement from the brothers without consulting Harry first. William grew a twirly mustache and tied a helpless villager to some train tracks. William invented Covid. William exists on nothing but a diet of fresh orphan blood." In a review for Slate, Louis Staples expressed sympathy for Meghan as a victim of "racist and misogynistic bullying", but found the documentary "annoying," noting that the couple comes off as "out-of-touch, self-absorbed and cornier than a Hallmark movie." Camilla Tominey of The Telegraph was critical of Harry's claim that media tactics are "a dirty game," as he has now become "one of the contestants as soon as he took $90 million from the game show host that is Netflix." She also argued that Harry hardly seems to champion women's empowerment as he suggests "the late Queen Elizabeth II, a royal matriarch for more than 70 years, was somehow hoodwinked by her own (male) advisers," and despite his mental health advocacy he potentially inflicts damage on the mental health of others by "effectively gaslighting his own father and brother simply for doing their duty."

=== Awards and nominations ===
Year	Award	Category	Nominee	Result	Ref.
2023	Hollywood Critics Association TV Awards	Best Streaming Non-fiction Series	Harry & Meghan	Nominated	

== Responses ==
=== Political response ===
While understanding of Harry and Meghan's issue with media intrusion, the employment minister Guy Opperman described them as "a very troubled couple" that "are utterly irrelevant to this country and the progress of this country and the royal family." Bob Seely, the Conservative MP for the Isle of Wight, described the documentary as "a political issue" as Harry was "trashing his family and monetizing his misery for public consumption" and "attacking some important institutions." He announced plans for bringing forward a short private member's bill to amend the 1917 Titles Deprivation Act that, if passed, would be followed by MPs voting on a resolution that would enable the Privy Council to strip the couple of their royal status. Leader of the Opposition Keir Starmer said that he had not watched the documentary and expressed opposition to Seely's proposal to strip Harry and Meghan of their royal titles, saying that "politicians are a bit too quick to express views" and should not be involved in Royal matters. Tim Loughton, the Conservative MP for East Worthing and Shoreham, reacted by saying he was "ashamed that this deeply embarrassing couple bear the title of our great county. It is time to take the title back from someone so clearly lacking any respect."

In response to the documentary's statement that the 2016 Brexit referendum sparked an outbreak of "jingoism and nationalism", Lord Frost, the Brexit negotiator under Boris Johnson, said: "This smear just does not stand up to examination. All opinion surveys show that Britain is an unusually welcoming country to people of all backgrounds, has among the lowest levels of racism in Europe, and is most positive about diversity...[The Sussexes] are either ignorant of the real facts or making deliberately incorrect claims for political reasons." British broadcaster and former leader of the UK Independence Party and Reform UK party Nigel Farage believed the agenda behind the documentary was for Meghan to launch a political career: "They're playing the victim, they're making loads of money off the back of it, and this is all for her to launch her political career in the next two or three years."

==== Commonwealth ====
Afua Hirsch, writer and broadcaster who appeared on the documentary, branded the Commonwealth of Nations as "Empire 2.0" and a "privileged club of formally colonized nations" in which Britain continued to "[extract] wealth" from countries with poor economies. Kehinde Andrews echoed her sentiments by saying "It's not changed a thing, they've just got better PR." According to anonymous royal sources, the comments were perceived as a direct attack on the vision and legacy of Harry's grandmother, Queen Elizabeth II, who oversaw the process of decolonization of the UK's former colonies and in 2018 described the organization as a tool for "stability and continuity for future generations." Paul Bristow, the vice-chairman of the all-party group on the Commonwealth, found the comments made in the "Meghan and Harry soap opera" deeply insulting, adding "I think these comments are ill-informed and in no way reflect the modern Commonwealth."

Writing for The Hill, Mark Toth, an economist and historian, and Jonathan Sweet, a retired army colonel and military intelligence officer, argued that Harry and Meghan are "recklessly undermining the national security of the United Kingdom and, by extension, imperiling that of the United States and its allies." In their opinion, "Prince Harry wants the British and American publics to believe that the royal family, the Palace as an institution (or 'The Firm' as it is known), and the British media have all conspired to destroy him and his family. Both he and Meghan Markle offer only vague reasons as to why and how. They all hinge around allegations of racism against her, yet none involves specific accusations naming members of the royal family." They also point out that in their attempt to amass wealth, the couple is "jeopardizing" the Commonwealth, "a global economic alliance that accounts for nearly 10 percent of the United Kingdom's total foreign trade." The couple is also called out for fomenting racial divide, which would benefit the Russian and Chinese governments in achieving political, economic, and military power in parts of the Commonwealth and Africa, which would in return undermine "not only the United Kingdom but also the strength of its military and economic partnership with Washington — and as a result, U.S. national security."

=== Media responses ===
Harry & Meghan is highly critical of the British tabloid press and their closeness to the royal family through the Royal Rota. The docuseries mentions examples of racist prejudice against Meghan by the British tabloids press such as a Daily Mail headline from November 2016 that proclaimed she was "(Almost) Straight Outta Compton". After the first three episodes of Harry & Meghan openly criticized the British media environment, the Daily Mail carried 20 pages on the documentary. The docuseries was dubbed Megflix by the tabloids, a portmanteau of the words "Meghan" and "Netflix". According to David Olusoga, a participant in the documentary, the "vindictiveness of the tabloids was last week dialled up to new levels, not simply because attacks on Meghan sell papers but because the tabloids themselves have been called out by the Sussexes." He further characterized their response to the documentary's criticism where the tabloids "sought to refute the criticisms levelled against them by engaging in exactly the behaviours of which they stand accused." Shallon Lester, a YouTuber whose video footage was used in the docuseries as an example of "anti-Meghan and Harry accounts", stated no one from the series' production team reached out to her for comments or permission and added that she was willing to take legal action.

=== Royal family's response ===
After the docuseries was released, both Buckingham Palace and Kensington Palace declined to comment on its content. The Sunday Times reported that Harry and Meghan wanted to "sit down with the royal family" for a meeting to address their "issues" before the King and Queen's coronation in May 2023, which Harry and Meghan could attend. Referencing the palace's approach to instigate a reconciliation between Ngozi Fulani and Lady Susan Hussey, the latter of whom had made "unacceptable and deeply regrettable" comments about the other one's heritage, a source close to the couple stated that "Nothing like that was ever done when Harry and Meghan raised various concerns."

=== Markle family's response ===
In April 2023, Meghan's half-sister Samantha Markle included statements made in the docuseries in an amended complaint for the refiling of her defamation lawsuit against Meghan. In March 2024, After two years of hearings and filings, a federal judge handed Meghan a victory in the defamation case her half-sister filed against her in 2022. The judge dismissed Samantha Markle's lawsuit with prejudice, meaning she cannot refile the case.

=== Public opinion ===
Polls conducted by Savanta following the documentary's release showed that six in ten Britons felt it was a bad idea for the couple to film and release the documentary. Additionally, half of those polled did not trust Netflix to deliver an accurate and neutral account of events discussed within the series. Harry and Meghan's popularity in the UK suffered after the release of the documentary, with YouGov reporting that three in five Britons thought negatively of Harry and two-thirds had a low opinion of Meghan.

In a poll commissioned by The Times, YouGov reported that 44% of participants believed Harry had to be stripped of his titles while 32% thought he should be allowed to keep them. The survey, which was conducted following the documentary's release, also showed 44% of participants having more sympathy for Harry's brother and sister-in-law, William and Catherine, compared to 17% for Harry and Meghan. 23% said the docuseries made them think less of the couple, while 7% said it had the opposite effect for them. 65% of those questioned said that Harry and Meghan left the royal family by choice, while 11% said they had been forced out. 53% of respondents believed the couple did not deserve an apology from the royal family for their treatment, while 19% thought they did. 51% said the couple should not have security paid for by the British government, while 32% thought they should.

== Veracity of claims ==
=== Volume I ===
At the start of episode one, a note says that members of the royal family refused to participate in the series' production, but a senior palace source stated Buckingham Palace, Kensington Palace, and members of the royal family were not approached for comments. A Netflix source, however, insisted that they contacted the communications offices for the King and the Prince of Wales, asking them to respond to the couple's claims. Kensington Palace later confirmed that it had received an email from a third-party production company via an unknown organization's address and attempted to contact Archewell Productions and Netflix with inquiries about its authenticity, but never received a response. Story Syndicate, the production company behind Harry & Meghan, insisted that they had contacted the chief press officers at Buckingham Palace and Kensington Palace, and while Buckingham Palace did not respond, Lee Thompson, communications secretary for the Prince and Princess of Wales, contacted one of the show's producers on November 30 and requested to see footage from the docuseries. In accordance with industry practice, Story Syndicate refused to provide preview clips from the docuseries. Thompson did not reply to a follow-up email in which the company again included the claims that would be made and requested an official response. Harry and Meghan's press secretary later stated that an Archewell employee had been contacted by a royal employee after the deadline Story Syndicate had given for a response to be included in the docuseries.

In episode two, Meghan recalled the first time she met future in-laws, William and Catherine, stating "I was a hugger, always being a hugger. I didn't realize that that is really jarring for a lot of Brits. I guess I started to understand very quickly that the formality on the outside, carried through on the inside." In response to her claims, Catherine's maternal uncle Gary Goldsmith stated "Kate's a hugger. Yes! At her younger sister Pippa's wedding in 2017, she had Prince George in her arms and literally ran over to give me and my daughter Tallulah a massive hug... Kate is really relaxed in her own skin and she is not playing a part. As her uncle, I can tell you that this presentation of Kate as cold is just laughable."

Meghan also stated in the docuseries that the Toronto Police Service did not respond to her complaints when she was being stalked by photographers: "I would say to the police, 'If any other woman in Toronto said to you, I have six grown men who are sleeping in their cars around my house and following me everywhere that I go, and I feel scared, wouldn't you say that was stalking?' They said 'Yes, but there's really nothing we can do because of who you're dating'." James Ramer, who was deputy chief of the Toronto Police Service at the time, responded to the claims by stating: "Our officers were extremely professional. I oversaw the area that protected VIPs and I fully support the work they did there. We do not comment on investigations specifically (but) what I will say is I have confidence in the work our members did. There are always people who are never going to be happy."

In episode three, Meghan reflects on her engagement interview, describing it as an "orchestrated reality show". Mishal Husain, the BBC journalist who conducted the interview, said in response to the claims, "We went and had a conversation with Harry and Meghan and two members of their team beforehand and we talked about what the interview would cover, what they felt comfortable sharing." Former BBC director-general Tony Hall said that the couple's claims about the interview being "rehearsed" was "simply untrue". Historian David Olusoga claims in the documentary that in the UK black people are "0.2% of the journalists." The data he refers to were collected through a 2015 survey by City, University of London which found that 0.2% of journalists were black, 2.3% were mixed race and 2.5% were Asian. Figures obtained from NCTJ's 2022 analysis of UK Government data found that 13% of journalists are of "non-white backgrounds".

Also during the third episode, the Duchess stated that she had not been offered formal support to learn protocol and dressing as a royal. A "royal source" stated it was "a total lie", saying that "there was prep for everything, walkabouts — even though she was engaged to someone who'd done hundreds of them — clothes, everything". It was also claimed that Harry's private secretary had "presented Meghan with a 30-point dossier" about the royal family, its history, fashion, and British culture. Meghan also stated that Kensington Palace had prevented her from inviting her niece, Ashleigh Hale, to her wedding. This was disputed by palace sources, who alleged that Meghan had stated "she had a niece who she would in other circumstances have liked to invite".

Meghan's demonstration of her first curtsy to Queen Elizabeth II was described as "disrespectful" by Roya Nikkhah of The Sunday Times. In the scene, Meghan is shown saying "I mean, Americans will understand this, we have 'medieval times, dinner and tournament.' It was like that." She had previously stated in her 2021 interview that she learned how to curtsy immediately before meeting the Queen and "very quickly right in front of the house. We practiced and walked in." Author Gyles Brandreth said of the demonstration within the docuseries "It's embarrassing, because it is mocking – and nobody curtsies to the Queen like that, and nobody would have advised her to do it that way." Vanity Fair's Erin Vanderhoof argued that the criticisms did not consider Meghan's professed American viewpoint on nobility which she admitted were informed by Medieval Times-style theatrical and exaggerated performances. In the days after the documentary's release, a clip of Meghan curtsying in the TV series Suits emerged, suggesting that she was familiar with the concept.

In the docuseries, Meghan recalled being a "daddy's girl", while Harry remarked, "If Meg wasn't with me, then her dad would still be her dad". Neither referred to the letter reportedly sent by Markle's first wife, Roslyn Loveless, to the Metropolitan Police and shared with Meghan in 2019 in which she alleged that Meghan's father had sexually abused a child in the U.S. and admitted to traveling to the Philippines and Thailand for the purpose of abusing children. A representative for Meghan said she could not have spoken publicly about the letter because of concerns that doing so could jeopardize any future investigation or result in legal action. Meghan's stated willingness to assist the 2026 investigation into her father's conduct prompted renewed questions about why she had apparently remained silent or failed to follow up on the allegations for seven years. Critics questioned the couple's decision to use programs such as their Netflix docuseries to publicly attribute Meghan's distress during 2019 primarily to media coverage and the conduct of Harry's relatives, without mentioning the allegations concerning her father.

=== Volume II ===
The trailer released for the second volume features politician Ann Widdecombe's comments on Celebrity Big Brother in 2018, when she described Meghan as "trouble". In response to this inclusion, Widdecombe stated "If [Meghan] believes that Buckingham Palace briefed me, or briefed out to the papers a comment I made which was broadcast on television, then she is paranoid. If she doesn't believe that then she is deliberately peddling conspiracy theories which have no basis in fact. I did say it on Big Brother but it was not about race."

In episode four, Meghan stated that she could form a connection with Queen Elizabeth II as she reminded her of her own grandmother whom she took care of. Her half-sister Samantha Markle responded to the claim by stating: "The whole grandmother thing – that just did it for us. I think my grandmother would be rolling over in her grave if she saw that. [Meghan] didn't take care of her, she visited her." In the same episode, Harry and Meghan stated that they found their first residence Nottingham Cottage to be too small, with Meghan saying "Kensington Palace sounds very regal. Of course it does. It says 'palace' in the name, but Nottingham Cottage was so small." Harry added "The whole thing's on a slight lean. Really low ceilings, I don't know who was there before. They must have been short." Their remarks proved to be controversial as the previous tenants were his brother and sister-in-law, William and Catherine, and their eldest child George. Harry's maternal aunt Lady Jane Fellowes and her husband Robert Fellowes also occupied the cottage, and so did Queen Elizabeth II's uncle and aunt, Prince Henry, Duke of Gloucester and Princess Alice, Duchess of Gloucester. Andrew Hay, whose father Philip Hay lived in the cottage for ten years until his death in 1986, responded to Harry's claims that the cottage "was constructed for small people, humans of a bygone era" by stating: "[My father] was 6ft 4in and was entirely happy and comfortable there, even by the standards of humans of today. He had worked for the royal family for nearly 40 years, which he regarded as privilege, as he did living at Nottingham Cottage. He never complained about anything – but he had spent three and a half years as a prisoner of war on the Burma railway, so probably knew a little about physical and mental discomfort."

In episode five, Meghan suggested that couple wanted to move to another country, where they would not be bothered by the Royal Rota. In 2018, they considered moving to New Zealand, followed by another plan to move to South Africa in 2019, the latter of which, despite being approved by the royal family, was "scrapped" according to Harry after details of it were published by The Times in April 2019. By December 2019, Harry and Meghan were in negotiations with Charles about moving to Canada: "By the time I was speaking to my father from Canada, the family and their people knew that we were trying to find a different way of working for a minimum of two years," suggesting that they had intended to leave even before their wedding.

In response to Harry's statements that part of his plans for stepping back were leaked by his father's office, journalist Dan Wootton claimed that he had the story on their planned departure in December 2019 and was in touch with Harry's communications secretary who was briefing him with negative stories about other members of the royal family. Palace sources reacted to Harry's claims that the Queen was not the final decision maker about his status after stepping back. "Harry never wanted to admit to himself that it was the Queen who said, 'no, you're out'. He couldn't fathom that he wasn't the cheeky chappy who was going to sweet-talk grandma into getting what he wanted," so his view of the Queen changed from "my commander-in-chief, the boss" to "a diminutive figure sat in the corner."

In the docuseries, James Holt, the chief executive of the Archewell Foundation, stated that the report on the bullying allegations against Meghan, as "admitted by the journalist", was "done explicitly because of the Oprah interview." Valentine Low, the journalist who broke the story, responded by saying that he "was always explicit that the timing of the story was definitely connected with the Oprah interview" and "it wasn't [his] desire to get the story out before Oprah, or even the wishes of a sinister cabal of Palace plotters: it was the victims of the alleged bullying who wanted to have their story heard." He added that in the docuseries "Meghan does not deny the bullying claim or say that it was unfair. She is silent. She just lets James Holt and Prince Harry speak for her. And, in reality, they have nothing to say either."

Also during the sixth episode, Harry blames The Mail on Sunday for Meghan's 2020 miscarriage: "I believe my wife suffered a miscarriage because of what the Mail did. I watched the whole thing. Now do we absolutely know that the miscarriage was caused by that? Of course we don't. But bearing in mind the stress that that caused, the lack of sleep and the timing of the pregnancy, how many weeks in she was, I can say from what I saw that that miscarriage was created by what they were trying to do to her." The National Health Service describes the belief that a mother's emotional state could cause a miscarriage as "a common misperception", a view held up by the World Health Organization, the March of Dimes and the National Institute of Child Health and Development, all of which "do not consider stress a direct cause of miscarriages." Additionally, up to 20% of known pregnancies end in miscarriage, most of which are not preventable. Healthline also states that half of all miscarriages result from chromosomal abnormalities.

In the second volume, the couple also mentioned drones sent by photographers as they were staying temporarily in Tyler Perry's mansion. A reporter from The Daily Beast filed a Freedom of Information Act request with the Los Angeles Police Department to obtain information on the incident and reported that the couple planned on hiring a private security team. The legal document revealed that the reporter was in contact with a "rep" for Harry and Meghan who leaked the story and provided him with the address of Perry's property to verify their leak.

=== Misuse of images and footage ===
The teaser featured a photograph of the couple taken inside Buckingham Palace, which was the subject of a written complaint by palace aides as the Queen's permission was not sought in advance. Another photograph showing a crowd of photographers was later revealed to have been taken at the premiere of Harry Potter and the Deathly Hallows – Part 2 in July 2011, which neither Harry nor Meghan had attended, and before they had met each other. The trailer released for the series included a clip that was filmed in December 2021 as Katie Price arrived for a court hearing and thus was not related to either Harry or Meghan. Another clip featured footage of Michael Cohen leaving his apartment in New York and on his way to prison.

A photograph, taken when Harry and Meghan were at Archbishop Desmond Tutu's home, was used in the promotion of the documentary, apparently to show press intrusion. However, it was revealed that the photographer had been accredited, and their position to take such a photo was agreed by Harry and Meghan. Journalist, author, broadcaster and editor for the Evening Standard Robert Jobson stated, "This photograph...was taken from [an] accredited pool at Archbishop Tutu's residence in Cape Town. Only 3 people were in the accredited position. H & M agreed the position. I was there." Jobson later added, "We were covering an official visit where they had taxpayer funded protection and all the trappings. No conspiracy here, just lies, and misuse of photos taken from pools."

A source close to the production team stated that Harry and Meghan did not have editorial control over the trailer and that using stock photos and footage was "standard practice in documentary and trailer production".

The documentary itself shows newspaper headlines that have been featured misleadingly when discussing allegations of racism. The headline "Demons" from Liverpool Echo's front-page is a story about the Hillsborough disaster. Some headlines from US outlets are also used, though it is not made clear that they were not put out by the UK media. A headline with the phrase "Princess in crisis" is an untrue story about Catherine, Princess of Wales circulated in the US.

The BBC emphasised that it did not grant Netflix permission to use two clips totaling 42 seconds of its 1995 Panorama interview with Diana, Princess of Wales in the docuseries. BBC director-general Tim Davie had previously announced that they would not license the program in part or in whole to be used by other broadcasters. The decision had come after a long inquiry which uncovered the deceitful means through which the interview was obtained, and prompted Prince William to request the interview never be aired again. Netflix stated that all external material was used "under fair dealing/fair use copyright exceptions."

In the trailer released for the second volume, Harry states that "They were happy to lie to protect my brother," but the subtitles for the trailer included on Netflix's website read "The British media are happy to lie to protect my brother."

Following criticism of "inaccurate" accounts of events in the docuseries and the misuse of images and footage, it was reported that the UK Government was planning on a new law as a part of the Government's Media Bill that would bring all streaming services under the jurisdiction of Ofcom, which could see them investigated for breaching certain codes of conduct.
