= Thomas Markle =

American lighting director and director of photography (born 1944)

- Mug shot of Markle in 2026
- Born: Thomas Wayne Markle; July 18, 1944 (age 82); Newport, Pennsylvania, U.S.
- Occupations: Lighting designer and director of photography (ret.)
- Years active: 1963–2011
- Spouses: Roslyn Loveless (m. 1964; div. 1975) Doria Ragland (m. 1979; div. 1987)
- Children: Samantha; Thomas Jr.; Meghan
- Family: Markle
- Awards: Daytime Emmy Awards (1982 and 2011); Chicago/Midwest Emmy Award

Thomas Wayne Markle (born July 18, 1944) is an American retired television lighting director and director of photography. He received a Chicago/Midwest Emmy Award for Made in Chicago in 1975 and was a co-recipient of two Daytime Emmy Awards for General Hospital in 1982 and 2011.

His youngest child is Meghan, Duchess of Sussex, from whom he has been estranged since 2018. In November 2026, Markle was arrested and charged with one count of possession of child sexual abuse material. He has denied possessing child sexual abuse images.

== Early life ==
High school yearbook portrait, 1962

Thomas Wayne Markle Sr. was born on July 18, 1944, and raised in Newport, Pennsylvania, the son of Doris May Rita (née Sanders; 1920–1991) and Gordon Arnold Markle (1918–1979). His mother's family was from New Hampshire. Markle's paternal family, whose surname was formerly spelled Merckel, has 18th-century origins in the Alsatian town of Lampertsloch, Hanau-Lichtenberg, now part of Bas-Rhin, France. He had two brothers, Michael (1939–2021) and Frederick (also known as Dismas F. Markle; born 1942). He was raised Anglican.

Markle's distant ancestors include his paternal great-great-grandmother, New Hampshire landowner Mary Hussey Smith (died 1908), a descendant of Christopher Hussey. He also descends from Sir Philip Wentworth and Mary Clifford, a daughter of John Clifford, 7th Baron Clifford and Lady Elizabeth Percy, a descendant of Edward III.

== Career ==
Markle worked as a lighting director at WTTW-TV Channel 11 in the 1970s. He worked on the television series General Hospital and Married... with Children. He also oversaw the lighting for the 1984 Summer Olympics.

=== Awards ===
In 1975, he received a Chicago / Midwest Emmy Award for Outstanding Achievement for Individual Excellence: Non Performers for his lighting design work on WTTW-TV Channel 11's Made in Chicago program.

In 1982, Markle was one of 14 named recipients of a Daytime Emmy Award for Outstanding Achievement in Design Excellence for a Daytime Drama Series for work on General Hospital, and in 2011, he shared a Daytime Emmy Award with Vincent Steib for Outstanding Achievement in Lighting Direction for a Drama Series for work on General Hospital. He was also nominated (with various co-nominees) for Daytime Emmy Awards for work on General Hospital on seven other occasions.

Markle and two others were nominated for a Primetime Emmy Award in 1986 for Outstanding Lighting Direction (Electronic) for a Miniseries or a Special for the lighting design of the 58th Academy Awards.

== Personal life ==
Markle married student and secretary Roslyn Loveless (1945–2024) in 1964; they had met the year before at a campus party at the University of Chicago. They had two children, Yvonne Marie Markle, born in 1964 and later known as Samantha, and Thomas Wayne Markle Jr., born in 1966. The couple divorced in 1975. In a 2019 interview with the Daily Mirror, Loveless accused Markle of having extramarital affairs during their marriage, which he denied.

He married Doria Ragland at the Self-Realization Fellowship Temple of Paramahansa Yogananda in Hollywood, California, on December 23, 1979, officiated by Brother Bhaktananda. Their daughter, Rachel Meghan Markle, was born on August 4, 1981. The couple separated when their daughter was two years old, and their marriage ended in divorce in 1987. He won a California State Lottery prize in 1990, "scooping $750,000 with five numbers, which included Meghan's birth date". Thomas Markle primarily raised Meghan from the time she was nine, and she started living full-time with him as Ragland pursued a career. He paid for Meghan's private education from preschool at Hollywood Little Red Schoolhouse to Northwestern University as well as living expenses. In addition to his regular job, Markle spent time helping with lighting for plays and musicals at Immaculate Heart High School, which Meghan attended.

In 2016, Markle filed for bankruptcy for a second time over a debt of $30,000. He lived in Rosarito, Mexico, before moving to Cebu, Philippines, in 2025.

In May 2018, Markle suffered two heart attacks and underwent heart surgery days before his youngest daughter Meghan's wedding to Prince Harry. In May 2022, he was hospitalized after suffering a stroke. In December 2025, he underwent emergency surgery for a blood clot in his left leg, resulting in its amputation below the knee. He subsequently underwent a second surgery to remove a blood clot in his left thigh. A spokesperson for Meghan confirmed that she had sent a letter to her father. In 2026, he suffered another stroke.

In May 2026, Markle returned to the U.S. for ongoing medical care. As of October 2026, he was in a rehabilitation center in Florida. In October 2026, he stated that he had been diagnosed with dementia. In the same month, Markle moved to a Florida care facility specializing in memory care for dementia patients. In the following month, a psychiatric evaluation determined that he was mentally competent to stand trial, understand the charges against him, and assist in his own legal defense.

=== In the media ===
In 2018, Markle was the subject of considerable media speculation as to whether he would attend his daughter Meghan's wedding to Prince Harry, at Windsor Castle in the United Kingdom. He did not attend as, according to his daughter, he was recovering from heart surgery after being discharged from the hospital two days before the wedding. He later stated that he was never sent a formal invitation from his youngest child.

In May 2018, a few days before the wedding, Markle became the subject of controversy after it was revealed that he had staged paparazzi photographs of himself in exchange for money. Samantha later stated that it was her idea, and that her father's motivation was not financial but "to show the world that [he's] getting in shape and doing great healthy things." Markle said that he initially had told Harry about the staged photos and later regretted his decision. Later it was reported that the photographer who took the pictures previously worked for Markle's youngest daughter Meghan and had been hired by Meghan after she moved back to the United States. In November 2021, Markle sued the photo agency Coleman-Rayner in Los Angeles County Superior Court and sought $1 million in damages, alleging that the staged paparazzi photos were published without his approval and he was not given his 30% share of sales from images in accordance with the initial contract. In September 2022, a judge issued a restraining order instructing Markle to keep away from Jeff Rayner for the next two years as Rayner stated that Markle had threatened to harm him in his published statements in Tom Bower's book Revenge: Meghan, Harry and the War Between the Windsors. The case against the photo agency was dismissed in January 2023.

In June 2018, he appeared on Good Morning Britain, in which he discussed his personal relationship with Meghan and his son-in-law. In another interview with The Mail on Sunday in July 2018, Markle said that his daughter "[would] be nothing without me. I made her the person she is today." His repeated paid interviews with the media reportedly damaged his relationship with his youngest daughter, with whom he indicated he had not been in contact since her second wedding.

In February 2019, he published excerpts of a letter sent to him by his youngest daughter shortly after her second wedding, in direct response to a People article involving five of Meghan's friends referencing the letter and negatively commenting on his character, in which she stated that he had broken her heart "into a million pieces" with his actions. Markle described the letter as "a dagger to the heart" rather than an "olive branch". The letter later became the subject of a privacy and copyright infringement case involving Meghan and Associated Newspapers, during which Meghan and Harry's former communications secretary Jason Knauf revealed that when writing the letter Meghan wondered whether she should refer to her father as "daddy" as she believed "in the unfortunate event that it leaked, it would pull at the heartstrings".

In January 2020, it was reported that The Mail on Sunday could use evidence provided by Markle in the ongoing legal dispute between the newspaper and Meghan. The Daily Mail also named him as a potential witness who could testify against Meghan in court. In the same month, he said in an interview that Meghan is "tossing away every young girl's dream of becoming a princess, because of money", and that Meghan and Harry are "destroying and cheapening" the royal institution, and that they are "lost souls". He also stated that he does not expect to see Meghan ever again but still hopes for reconciliation one day as he always took care of her and still loves her.

In July 2021, Markle stated that he would be petitioning California courts for rights to see his grandchildren Archie and Lilibet.

In 2022, Markle began publishing videos on the YouTube channel Remarkable Friendship with photographer Karl Larsen. He later said that he had ended their relationship after they recorded their final video.

In 2023, Markle, his son and his eldest daughter took part in a 7NEWS Spotlight special titled The Markles.

=== Allegations of child sexual abuse material ===
==== Investigation and discovery of alleged material ====
According to reports in October 2026, Markle was under investigation after his son, Thomas Markle Jr., reportedly submitted a sworn statement to Philippine authorities, after contacting U.S. authorities in July 2026, alleging that he had found a large collection of suspected child sexual abuse images among family memorabilia and electronic storage devices at his father's residence in Cebu, Philippines. Reports said that the Philippine National Police were preparing to seize the alleged evidence and that the Federal Bureau of Investigation (FBI) was considering an investigation in the United States. The Philippine secretary of the interior and local government, Jonvic Remulla, stated that they had retrieved a "trove of child pornography materials as well as a laptop" from Markle's former home and all signs pointed to him being a "possible sex offender of the grossest kind". The FBI said it would assist the Philippine authorities in their investigation and examine whether any violations of U.S. federal law had occurred.

Markle was reportedly referred to the FBI after suspected child sexual abuse material was discovered in a storage unit in Rosarito Beach, Mexico, which he had allegedly rented and abandoned. According to reports, journalists from the Daily Mail gained access to the storage facility, located approximately three miles from his former residence in the Mexican resort town. Among the materials reportedly discovered were books about pedophilia, magazines depicting the sexual abuse of children, black-and-white photographs, and 35mm negatives allegedly containing voyeuristic images of children on a beach. Reporters also found a paper plate bearing the words "dark web" alongside various URLs and instructions for running the WinCleaner program, which can be used to wipe hard drives. In an interview with The Mail on Sunday, Markle said he "had no storage units in Rosarito". Thomas Markle Jr. also alerted the FBI to two storage units in Los Angeles, California, that his father had reportedly rented and paid for via auto-pay for roughly 15 years. In a statement, the FBI said they had retrieved 78 items from the storage units, including two images depicting "an adult man – whom a witness identified as Markle – with a nude prepubescent girl." The witness was later reported to have been Markle's second wife, Doria Ragland.

==== Responses ====
Markle's elder daughter, Samantha Markle, denied the allegations and accused her brother of fabricating them. She suggested that he was motivated by resentment over the loss of financial support, questioned whether the alleged material could be traced to their father's devices, and raised the possibility of tampering. His younger daughter, Meghan, said she was "deeply distressed" by the allegations. She stated that a letter raising similar concerns about her father had been sent to the Metropolitan Police and later shared with her for her awareness. The letter was reportedly written by Markle's first wife, Roslyn Loveless, and alleged that Thomas Markle Sr. had sexually abused a child in the U.S. and admitted to traveling to the Philippines and Thailand for the purpose of abusing children.

Meghan's office initially said that she had received the letter in the summer of 2018, after her wedding. She said she had been given assurances that the allegations were being investigated. The letter reportedly spanned seven pages and was handed to Meghan by her bodyguard, who assured her that an investigation would take place, although the bodyguard's identity could not be traced by the Metropolitan Police as of October 2026. No investigation into the allegations took place, as the Metropolitan Police did not have jurisdiction over Markle. The Metropolitan Police, after initially failing to locate the letter and asking Meghan for a copy, confirmed that it had received the letter in January 2019, rather than in 2018 as initially reported, but it had not shared the letter with any overseas authorities. The Metropolitan Police then referred itself to the Independent Office for Police Conduct (IOPC) over its handling of the letter and announced it would make referrals to relevant overseas law enforcement agencies.

Samantha Markle, who described her mother as an alcoholic and abusive, said she believed Loveless had written the letter out of "hatred and bitterness" and added "she never ever once mentioned to me that she thought Dad was a pedophile". A representative for Meghan said she could not have spoken publicly about the letter because of concerns that doing so could jeopardize any future investigation or result in legal action. The representative added that, without a written record or documentation made at the time, a mistake of a few months on her part would be understandable. Meghan said her decision to keep her distance from him and to prevent contact with her children was intended to protect them. She reportedly authorized a source close to her to tell the media that she wanted to cooperate fully with the FBI and other international authorities investigating him.

In the 2022 Netflix docuseries Harry & Meghan, Meghan recalled being a "daddy's girl", while Harry remarked, "If Meg wasn't with me, then her dad would still be her dad". Neither referred to the letter reportedly sent by Markle's first wife. Her stated willingness to assist the investigation into her father's conduct prompted renewed questions about why she had apparently remained silent or failed to follow up on the allegations for seven years. Critics questioned why she had not independently contacted law enforcement to establish the status of the investigation or offer assistance, particularly given her public advocacy for the protection of women and children online. Others also questioned the couple's decision to publicly attribute Meghan's distress during 2019 primarily to media coverage and the conduct of Harry's relatives, without mentioning the allegations concerning her father. Meghan reportedly wrote to her estranged father in December 2025 while he was hospitalized in the Philippines, informing him that she was aware of the allegations against him and that authorities knew about them, making clear that he would never meet her children and indicating that the letter would be her final communication with him.

Markle denied possessing child sexual abuse images, describing the allegations as "sick lies" and saying that he was shocked and hurt by his son's accusations, which he said were an attempt to destroy him. He also said, "I have never had sex with anyone under the age of 18". In an October 2018 interview, he said he would enjoy spending time at a Playboy Club in the Philippines but had not paid for sex. He later said he had paid for sex in the Philippines. Thomas Markle Jr. described his father's denial as "incredible" and challenged him to explain how the material had come to be there if it was not his, asking who else could have placed it there and why. In November 2026, it was reported that Thomas Markle Jr. had been named a "person of interest" in the Philippine authorities' investigation into the allegations against his father. Philippine secretary of the interior and local government Jonvic Remulla said that there were "signs that point that the son is involved in the crime as well", but he added that Markle Jr. was not yet being treated as a suspect. His alleged involvement was not thought to be directly connected to the material he had handed over to the police. Later in the same month, it was reported that Philippine police had apologized to Markle Jr. after their inquiries into his alleged involvement had been resolved. The investigation had reportedly been extended to include Markle Jr. after police had received witness statements alleging that underage girls had been brought to Markle Jr.'s home in Cordova, Cebu, with ring lights, through the windows. Police reportedly interviewed his fiancée, Rose Ann Gabuya, and members of his wider circle before resolving the matter.

==== Arrest ====
On November 6, Markle was arrested in relation to the allegations and charged with one count of possession of child pornography. Later that day, he appeared at the Middle District of Florida courthouse in Tampa. He was released on bond and placed under house arrest with electronic monitoring. On November 10, Markle was arrested again after allegedly removing his ankle monitor and appeared in court. He was ordered to be held without bond in federal custody. On November 19, Markle was found mentally competent to stand trial following a psychiatric evaluation.

==== Philippine charges ====
On November 17, it was reported that Philippine police had filed three charges against Markle with prosecutors in Cebu: two counts relating to offering, distributing, selling, exporting or importing child sexual abuse or exploitation material, and one count of possessing such material. The charges were being reviewed by prosecutors, who would decide whether to issue a subpoena.
