= Fleisher Covered Bridge =

Covered bridge in Pennsylvania, US

- U.S. National Register of Historic Places
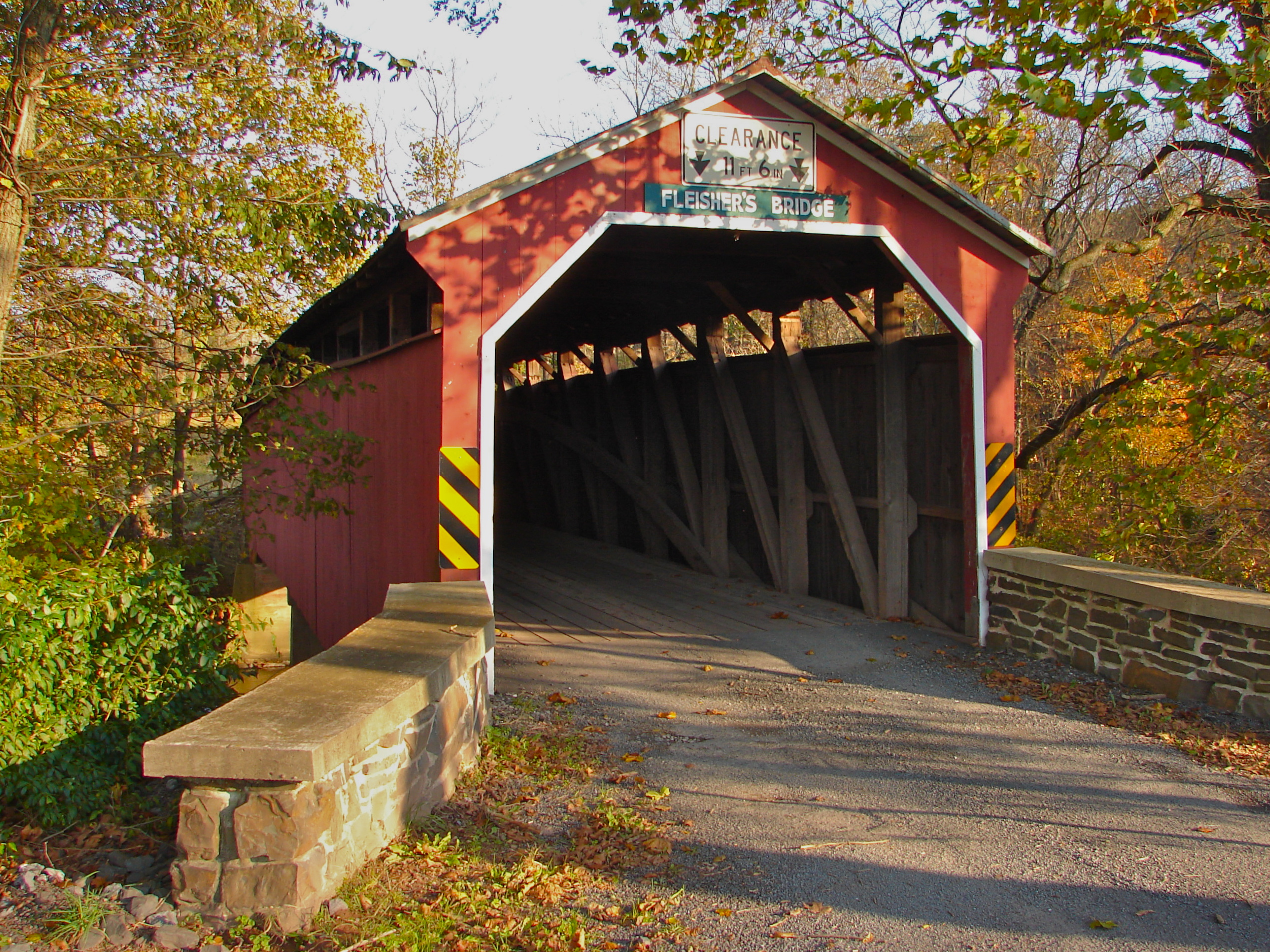
- Fleisher Covered Bridge, October 2010

- Location within Pennsylvania Location within the United States
- Location: Northwest of Newport on Township 477, Oliver Township, Pennsylvania
- Coordinates: 40°29′22″N 77°9′31″W
- Area: 0.1 acres (0.040 ha)
- Built: 1887
- Architect: Yohn & Ritter
- Architectural style: Burr
- MPS: Covered Bridges of Adams, Cumberland, and Perry Counties TR
- NRHP reference No.: 80003601
- Added to NRHP: August 25, 1980

The Fleisher Covered Bridge, also known as Fleisher's Covered Bridge, is an historic wooden covered bridge located in Oliver Township, near the community of Newport in Perry County, Pennsylvania. It was built as a single-span bridge in 1887.

This bridge was listed on the National Register of Historic Places in 1980.

== History and architectural features ==
Crossing Big Buffalo Creek, the Fleisher Covered Bridge is a 113-foot-long, single-span, Burr truss bridge, which was constructed in 1887.

Steel I-beams were erected in 1960.

In 1986, repairs were completed on the bridge's fourth bearing point. In 1993, engineers recommended the installation of new steel floor beams and hangers to shift the bridge's arch and truss loads to the steel beams.

== Gallery ==
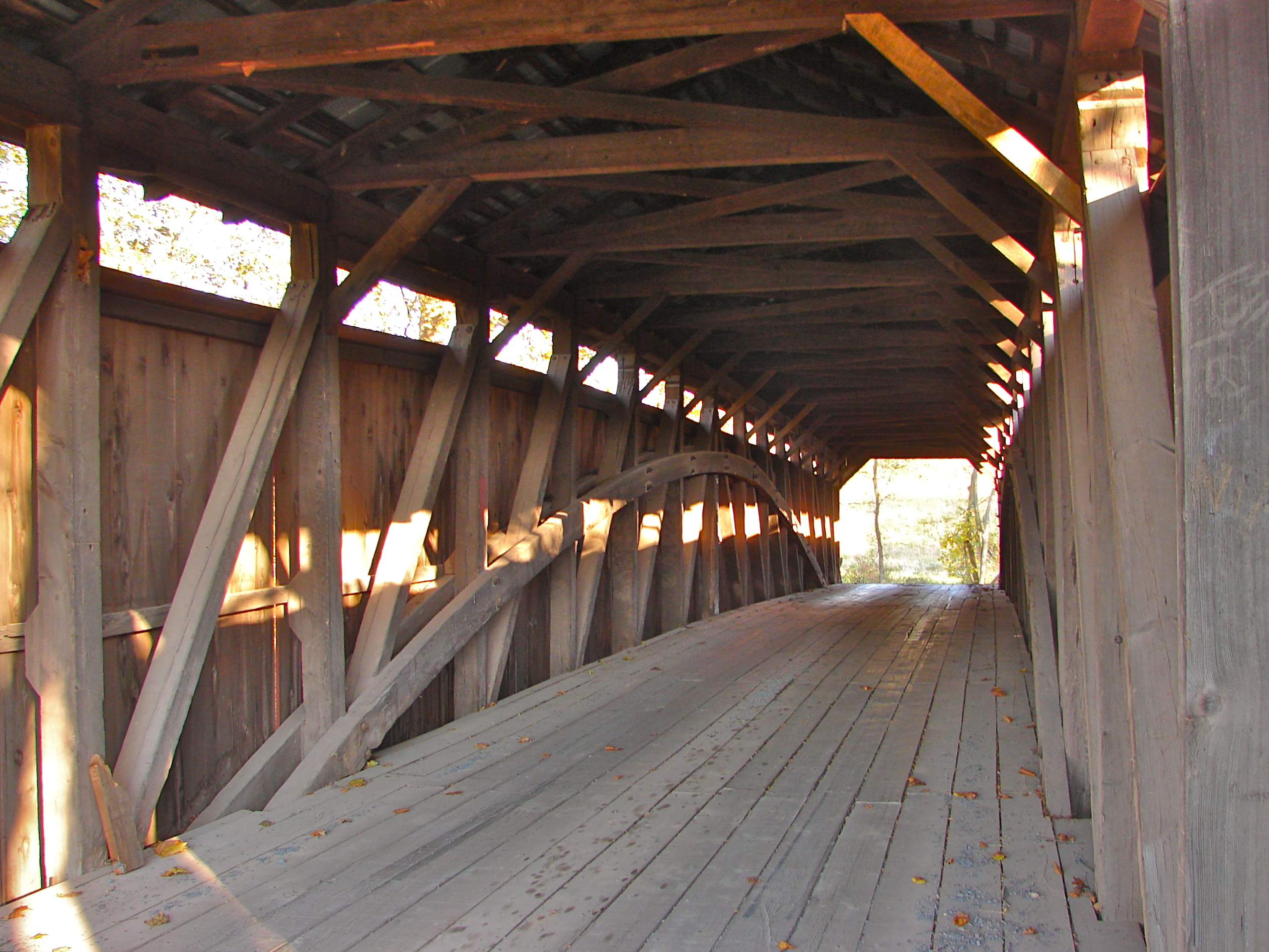
Fleisher Covered Bridge, interior
