= Newport Historic District (Newport, Pennsylvania) =

Historic district in Pennsylvania, United States

- U.S. National Register of Historic Places
- U.S. Historic district
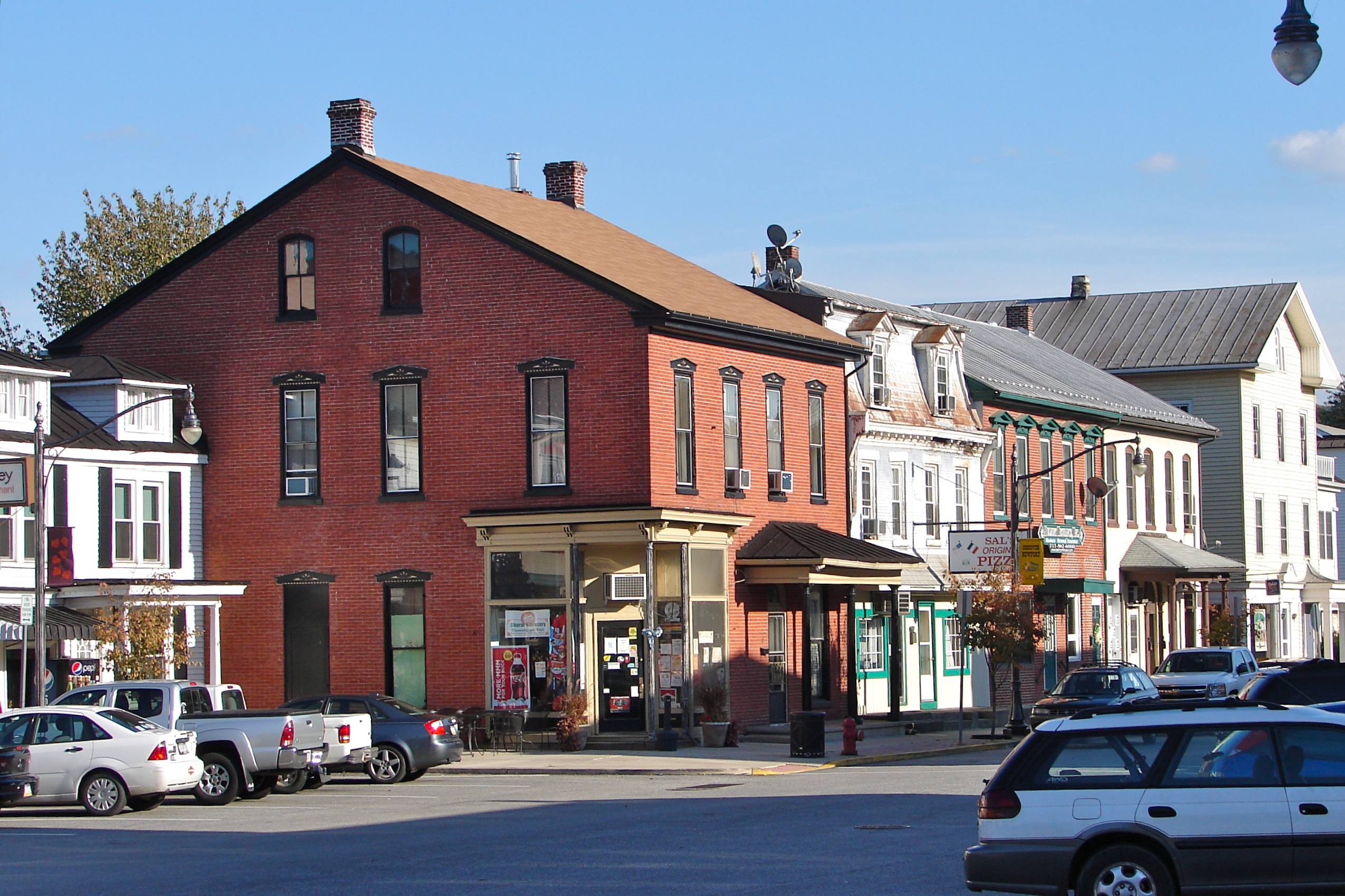
- Second Street south of Center Square

- Location within Pennsylvania Location within the United States
- Location: Roughly bounded by Fickes Ln., Oliver St., Front St., Little Buffalo Run, Bloomfield Av. and Sixth St., Newport, Pennsylvania and Oliver Township, Pennsylvania
- Coordinates: 40°28′39″N 77°7′58″W
- Area: 144 acres (58 ha)
- Built: 1820
- Architect: Hetrick, John L; Frank, J.C., et al.
- Architectural style: Italianate, Second Empire, I-house
- NRHP reference No.: 99000321
- Added to NRHP: March 12, 1999

The Newport Historic District is a national historic district that is located in Newport and Oliver Township, Perry County, Pennsylvania, United States.

It was listed on the National Register of Historic Places in 1999.

== History and architectural features ==
This district consists of a large residential neighborhood of primarily vernacular, working-class homes, a commercial area, industrial buildings, public buildings, three bridges, and a cemetery. Of the 418 contributing buildings, 361 are residences. Notable commercial buildings include the Graham Hotel (1871), Butz Building (1875), and Centennial Building (1876). The remains of the Jones Warehouse date prior to 1820 and are a part of the David M. Myers Warehouse.

In 2004, the Newport Square underwent a revitalization project, during which all overhead power lines were moved underground or rerouted. Updates included the addition of period-style streetlamps, as well as ornamental trees, brick planters and new flag poles. These changes helped return the square to a more historical appearance.

It was listed on the National Register of Historic Places in 1999.

== Gallery ==
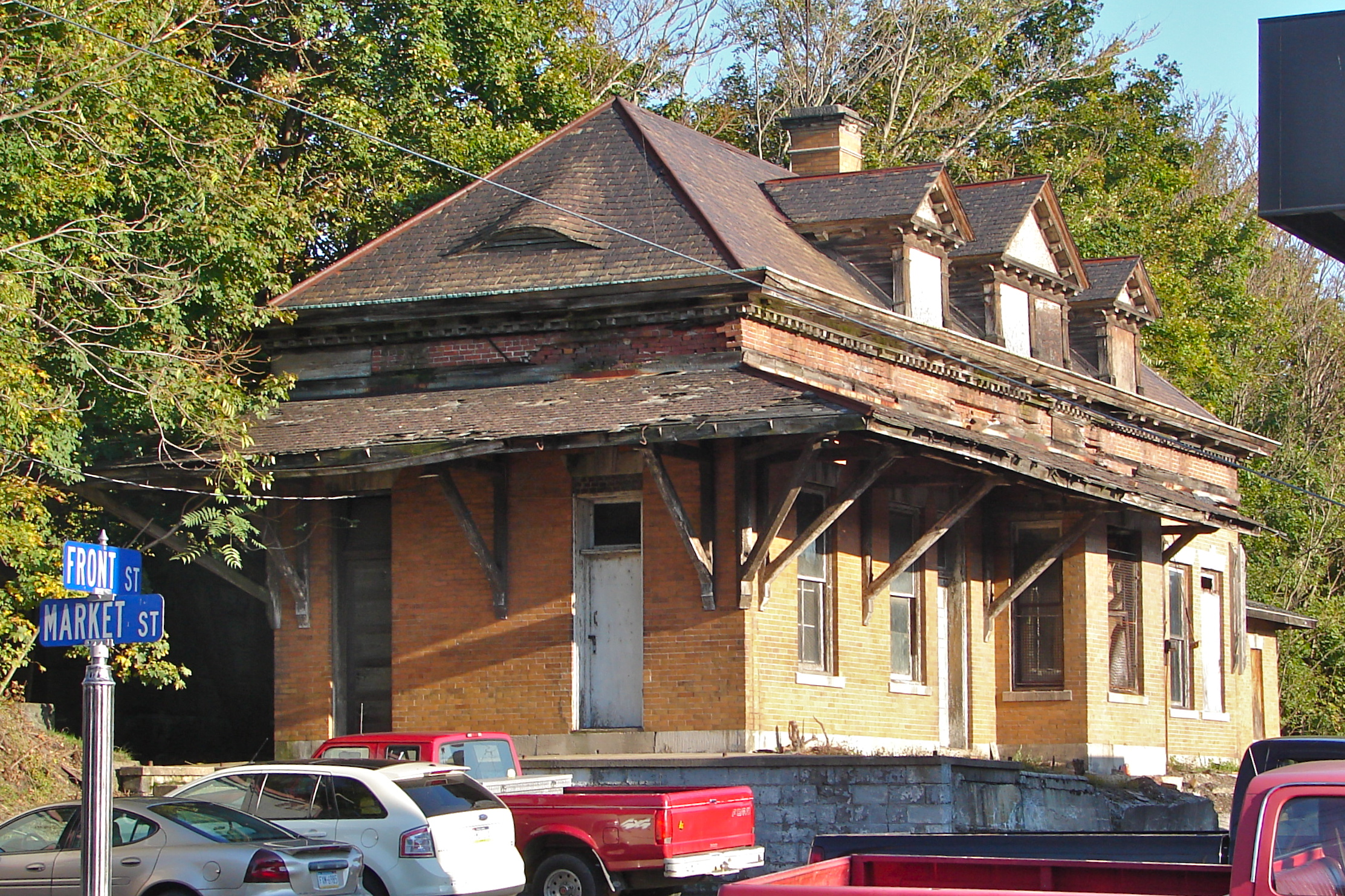
Pennsylvania Railroad depot

== Places of note ==
- Bridge in Newport Borough

== Historical residences ==
=== 15 South Second Street ===
- 15 South Second Street
- U.S. Historic district – Contributing property
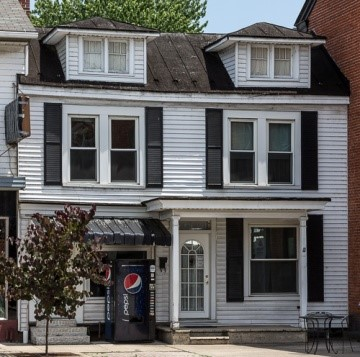
- 15 South Second Street, 2015
- Location: 15 South Second Street, Newport, Pennsylvania
- Coordinates: 40°28′39″N 77°07′48″W
- Built: c. 1910
- Part of: Newport Historic District (ID99000321)
- Designated CP: March 12, 1999

15 South Second Street is a historic home located in Newport, Pennsylvania. It served as home to many Newsstands as well as a grocer and clothier over the years.

This is a two-story home with a hipped roof, resting on a stone foundation. Its original clapboards are now clad in aluminum siding. The home has two bay windows, with a storefront on first story. It has a pair of double windows on the 2nd floor along with hipped-roof dormers with triple panes in the upper sashes.

This was home to the William Witmer Newsstand, Jess Thomas Newsstand, Russel Zeiders Newsstand, Charles Fleck Grocer, Joseph Frish Clothing and Watches as well as the Margaret Bell Millinery.

It was designated a contributing property to the Newport Historic District, identified as #70 in the National Register of Historic Places Resource Inventory: Newport Historic District.

=== 20 South Second Street ===
- 20 South Second Street
- U.S. Historic district – Contributing property
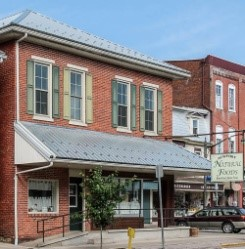
- 20 South Second Street, 2015
- Location: 20 South Second Street, Newport, Pennsylvania
- Coordinates: 40°28′38″N 77°07′50″W
- Built: c. 1890
- Part of: Newport Historic District (ID99000321)
- Designated CP: March 12, 1999

20 South Second Street is a historic home located in Newport, Pennsylvania.

This is a two-story home with a hipped roof, resting on a stone foundation. The all brick structure is 4 pays wide with a storefront at the corner. Clapboard siding was added around the storefront along with a wraparound porch with modern wood columns.

Now home of Newport Natural Foods, I was home to the following businesses: The William "Bill" Welfley Drug Store, Earl Gower Drug Store, Charles E. Bosserman Drug Store & Soda Fountain, State Liquor Store, the Post Office from 1922 to 1932, Fleck and Hyman Clothing, D. H. Spots Clothing, Marx Dukes Clothing. Originally known as the Dr James B. Eby building

It was designated a contributing property to the Newport Historic District, identified as #71 in the National Register of Historic Places Resource Inventory: Newport Historic District.

=== 51 South Second Street ===
- 51 South Second Street
- U.S. Historic district – Contributing property
- Location: 51 South Second Street, Newport, Pennsylvania
- Coordinates: 40°28′37″N 77°07′47″W
- Built: c. 1910
- Part of: Newport Historic District (ID99000321)
- Designated CP: March 12, 1999

51 South Second Street is a residential and commercial property located in Newport, Pennsylvania.

Built around 1890, this two story side gabled brick on stone foundation has five bays, modern storefront on the north side of the first story, elaborate incising on window pediments and frieze board, eave brackets, a one-story 2/3 front porch with gingerbread and turned wooden columns.

Was Charles Welfley Clothing, Bernie Carl Clothing, Charles Brandt Clothing, Newport One Price Store and Peter Schlomer Clothing and Saddlery. In the alley behind was the Kough Warehouse Commission.

It was designated a contributing property to the Newport Historic District, identified as #70 in the National Register of Historic Places Resource Inventory: Newport Historic District.

This property can also be found on the Newport Sesquicentennial Self-Guided Walking Tour.

=== 119 South Second Street ===
- 119 South Second Street
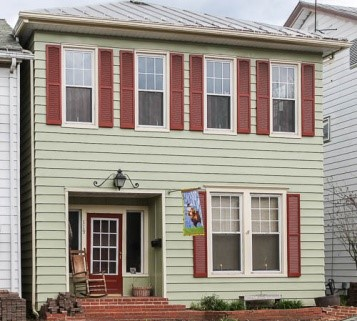
- 119 South Second Street, 2015
- Location: 119 South Second Street, Newport, Pennsylvania
- Coordinates: 40°28′34″N 77°07′44″W
- Built: 1880
- Part of: Newport Historic District (ID99000321)
- Designated: March 12, 1999

119 South Second Street, also known as the Jacob Frank Carriage Shop, is a historic home located in Newport Pennsylvania.

This building was originally the location of the Jacob Frank Carriage Shop. A two-story home with a hipped roof, resting on a stone foundation, it was designed with a front entrance that was wide enough to allow carriages to pass through. Although the structure has been vastly altered over the years, it still has its decorative eave brackets. Its original clapboards are now clad in aluminum siding. The home has an inset entrance and a paired window on the first story.

The structure was designated a contributing property to the Newport Historic District, identified as #103 in the National Register of Historic Places Resource Inventory: Newport Historic District.
