= Straight Outta Compton (disambiguation) =

Straight Outta Compton is the 1989 debut studio album by N.W.A.

Straight Outta Compton may also refer to:

- "Straight Outta Compton" (song), the lead single from the 1989 N.W.A album of the same name
- Straight Outta Compton: N.W.A 10th Anniversary Tribute, a 1998 tribute/compilation album
- Straight Outta Compton (film), an N.W.A biopic directed by F. Gary Gray
  - Straight Outta Compton: Music from the Motion Picture, the film's soundtrack album

== See also ==
- Compton: A Soundtrack by Dr. Dre, an album often characterized as a soundtrack to the film
- "(Almost) Straight Outta Compton", the title of a controversial 2016 MailOnline article about Meghan Markle
