= Oliver Township, Perry County, Pennsylvania =

Township in Pennsylvania, US

Coordinates: 40°28′00″N 77°06′59″W

- Township
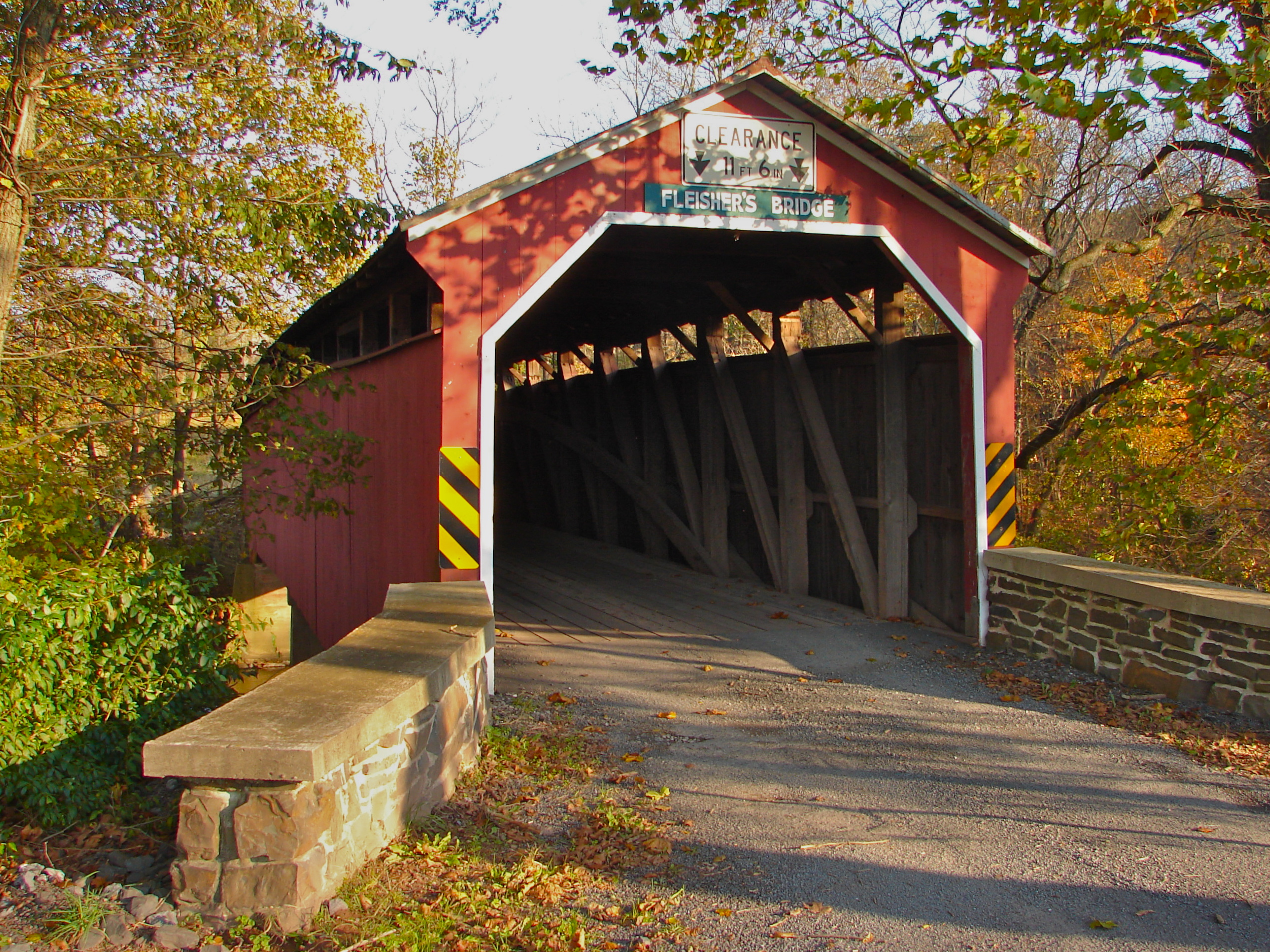
- Fleisher Covered Bridge

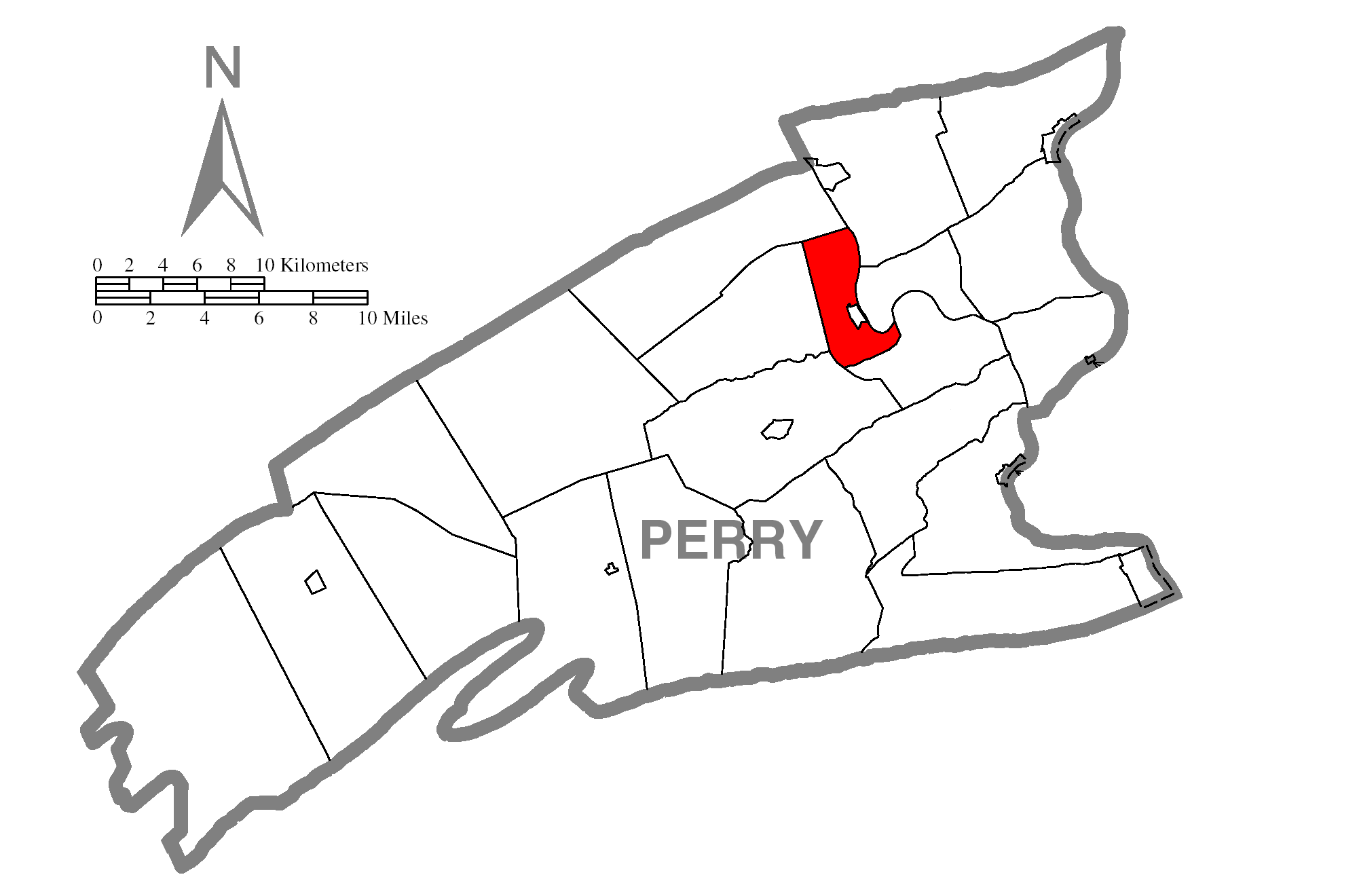
- Map of Perry County, Pennsylvania highlighting Oliver Township

- Map of Perry County, Pennsylvania
- Country: United States
- State: Pennsylvania
- County: Perry
- Settled: 1788
- Incorporated: 1837

Government
  - Type: Board of Supervisors
  - Chairman: James Spotts
  - Vice-chairman: Lee Morrison
  - Supervisor: Joseph Baker

Area
  - Total: 8.53 sq mi (22.10 km^{2})
  - Land: 8.24 sq mi (21.33 km^{2})
  - Water: 0.30 sq mi (0.78 km^{2})

Population (2020)
  - Total: 2,044 ▲
  - Estimate (2023): 2,054
  - Density: 235.0/sq mi (90.73/km^{2})
- Time zone: UTC-5 (Eastern (EST))
  - Summer (DST): UTC-4 (EDT)
- Area code: 717
- FIPS code: 42-099-56728
- Website: Oliver Township

Oliver Township is a township in Perry County, Pennsylvania, United States. The population was 2,044 at the 2020 census.

== History ==
The Bridge in Newport Borough, Fleisher Covered Bridge, and Newport Historic District are listed on the National Register of Historic Places.

== Geography ==
According to the United States Census Bureau, the township has a total area of 8.6 square miles (22.1 km^{2}), of which 8.3 square miles (21.4 km^{2}) is land and 0.3 square mile (0.7 km^{2}) (3.16%) is water.

== Demographics ==
Historical population
Census	Pop.	Note	%±
2010	1,931		—
2020	2,044		5.9%
2023 (est.)	2,054		0.5%
U.S. Decennial Census

As of the census of 2000, there were 2,061 people, 811 households, and 603 families residing in the township. The population density was 249.1 inhabitants per square mile (96.2/km^{2}). There were 858 housing units at an average density of 103.7 per square mile (40.0/km^{2}). The racial makeup of the township was 97.96% White, 0.68% African American, 0.15% Native American, 0.53% Asian, 0.24% from other races, and 0.44% from two or more races. Hispanic or Latino of any race were 0.63% of the population.

There were 811 households, out of which 34.6% had children under the age of 18 living with them, 54.6% were married couples living together, 13.6% had a female householder with no husband present, and 25.6% were non-families. 21.2% of all households were made up of individuals, and 10.0% had someone living alone who was 65 years of age or older. The average household size was 2.54 and the average family size was 2.92.

In the township the population was spread out, with 26.0% under the age of 18, 8.8% from 18 to 24, 28.3% from 25 to 44, 25.6% from 45 to 64, and 11.2% who were 65 years of age or older. The median age was 36 years. For every 100 females, there were 95.0 males. For every 100 females age 18 and over, there were 91.6 males.

The median income for a household in the township was $39,063, and the median income for a family was $44,375. Males had a median income of $32,311 versus $28,542 for females. The per capita income for the township was $18,295. About 10.4% of families and 12.4% of the population were below the poverty line, including 19.3% of those under age 18 and 12.3% of those age 65 or over.
