= John W. Hetrick =

American engineer

John Willard Hetrick
- Born: July 23, 1918
- Died: April 8, 1999 (aged 80)
- Occupation: Engineer
- Known for: Airbag inventor

John Willard Hetrick (July 23, 1918 – April 8, 1999) was a twentieth-century American engineer. He is credited for inventing the airbag.

== Biography ==
Born in Newport, Pennsylvania on July 23, 1918, John W. Hetrick originally referred to his invention of the airbag as a "Safety cushion assembly for automotive vehicles." He built the original prototype on his kitchen table in 1952, and applied for a patent on Aug 5, 1952.

He served as an industrial engineer in the United States Navy and took notable design influences from compressed air torpedoes.

Hetrick received a US Patent #2,649,311 on August 18, 1953, for an "airbag". He did not receive much income for his invention, since automakers did not offer airbags widely until after his patent had expired in 1971.

Hetrick was awarded the Golden Gear Award for his invention.
