= Spoutible =

Social media platform launched in 2023

- Website type: Social networking service
- Founded: February 1, 2023; 3 years ago
- Area served: Worldwide
- Founder: Christopher Bouzy
- Key people: Phil Schnyder (COO)
- Website: https://spoutible.com/
- Users: 240,000 (June 2023)
- Current status: Active
- Written in: PHP, JavaScript, CSS

Spoutible is a social media and social networking service created by Christopher Bouzy, the founder of the Twitter analytics service Bot Sentinel. It launched in February 2023.

== History ==
In November 2022, after Elon Musk's acquisition of Twitter, Bouzy proposed the creation of a social media platform similar to Twitter, but with improvements to what he called its best features "while fixing everything wrong with Twitter", pledging to follow through with the proposal if 100,000 people joined a pre-registration mailing list.

Bouzy used Twitter to crowdsource details about the platform, including its name. Bouzy initially chose the name "Spout" in reference to the old Twitter error graphic of a whale being carried off by a flock of birds; he said that he chose "Spoutible" instead after the owner of the spout.com domain demanded $1.5 million. Phil Schnyder, a former director of online development for Avanquest, agreed to become the startup's COO.

In December 2022, a beta version of Spoutible was announced, with its launch set to occur in late January 2023. The launch occurred on February 1, 2023, with nearly 150,000 users having applied for pre-registration. The website faced many issues after going live, including its API not being adequately secured, which resulted in users' personal information being temporarily exposed. It eventually stabilized toward the end its first week. It was also found during this security faux pas that the platform was a reskinned version of an $89 to use Twitter clone made by a Russian programmer - a claim Bouzy denied at the time despite evidence of the clone's markup being fully visible.

By late March and early April 2023, celebrities such as Monica Lewinsky and Jason Alexander had joined the platform, along with journalists from news organizations such as The New York Times, the Associated Press and NPR. As of early June, around 240,000 users were registered on the platform. Client apps for Android and IOS were later made available. In February 2024, security consultant Troy Hunt detailed a vulnerability in Spoutible's API that could be exploited to obtain users' personal details, including the bcrypt hash of their passwords. The exploit exposed the information of 207,000 users. Spoutible addressed the vulnerability, stating that it had not leaked decrypted password or direct messages, and recommended that users change their passwords.

=== Terms of service dispute ===
On February 19, 2023, author and former law professor Courtney Milan expressed concerns about Spoutible's terms of service, saying that its ban on "sexually suggestive" language and links to "sexually explicit content" was so broad that it could prevent her and her colleagues promoting their work. She offered to use her legal expertise to tweak the platform's fine print, to which Bouzy responded, "Milan is more than welcome to start a social media platform and write the terms of service and policies however she likes. But the policy isn't changing, nor is it being rewritten."

Bouzy's refusal to engage with Milan angered many of her followers and fellow authors, with some vowing to quit the platform in protest. The next day, Bouzy shared a screenshot from Milan's Wikipedia article detailing a sexual harassment allegation she made in 2017 as part of the MeToo movement, with the sentence "It's clear this person has an agenda". Milan blocked him in response. Bouzy later deleted his spout about Milan and apologised to his followers for writing something "inarticulate"; Milan said she did not receive a personal apology from him. According to Bouzy, the incident resulted in a net win for Spoutible, with daily sign-ups increasing by 129% afterward.

== Features ==
Spoutible describes itself as a "safe, inclusive, and enjoyable online space" with a "zero-tolerance policy for targeted harassment, hate speech, disinformation, and platform manipulation". Spoutible includes the following features:

- Posts, which are referred to as "spouts", can be edited for up to seven minutes after being published.
- Spouts have a character limit of 300, compared to Twitter's 280. If a URL is included in a spout, it can be removed to reduce the character count.
- Users can delete replies that they find offensive.
- Blocked users cannot interact with the blocking user at all, including in response to comments.
- Integration with Bot Sentinel's scoring system to identify problematic accounts.
- Similar to Twitter, private messages can be sent. Conversations and personal information are encrypted.
- Account verification for people who have a blue check mark on Twitter.

In December 2023, Spoutible announced a policy update aimed at protecting the LGBT community, particularly transgender users. Under the updated policy, intentionally misgendering and deadnaming transgender people are prohibited.

== Operation ==
Spoutible chose not to seek external investment funding during its development phase. The company's initial funding came from Bouzy and Schnyder's personal savings and from Bot Sentinel, which relies on user donations. Due to the low funds, Spoutible is hosted on virtual servers by Ionos, the same web hosting company that hosts Bot Sentinel. During its development phase, Bouzy handled much of the frontend development work himself, relying on a network of low-cost international freelance developers recruited from sites such as Upwork for other tasks.
