= Doria Ragland =

American social worker and yoga instructor (born 1956)

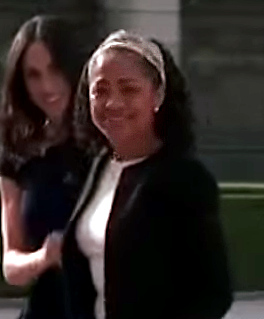
- Ragland (right) with her daughter, Meghan, in May 2018
- Born: Doria Loyce Ragland; September 2, 1956 (age 70); Cleveland, Ohio, U.S.
- Education: University of Southern California (MSW)
- Occupation: Social worker
- Spouse: Thomas Markle Sr. (m. 1979; div. 1987)
- Children: Meghan, Duchess of Sussex
- Family: Ragland

Doria Loyce Ragland (born September 2, 1956) (Note: A genealogical blog published by the New England Historic Genealogical Society contains an essay by a staff member that says she was born September 15, 1956.) is an American social worker. She is the mother of Meghan, Duchess of Sussex and the ex-wife of American retired television lighting director and director of photography Thomas Markle Sr. Ragland holds a degree in social work and is a former makeup artist and yoga instructor.

== Early life ==
Doria Loyce Ragland was born on September 2, 1956, in Cleveland, Ohio to nurse Jeanette Arnold (1929–2000) and her second husband Alvin Azell Ragland (1929–2011), an antiques dealer who sold items at flea markets. Ragland's maternal grandparents, James and Nettie Arnold, worked at the Hotel St. Regis on Euclid Avenue in Cleveland, he as a bellhop and she as an elevator operator, while her great-grandfather, Jeremiah Ragland, had his own tailor shop business in Chattanooga, Tennessee in the 1920s where he worked as a presser.

Her parents moved to Los Angeles when she was a baby and later divorced. In 1983, her father married kindergarten teacher Ava Burrow, who is near Ragland's age; the two remained close after that marriage also ended in divorce. Ragland has two older maternal half-siblings, Joseph (known as "JJ"; 1949–2021) and Saundra Johnson (born 1952), and a younger paternal half-brother, Alvin Joffrey Ragland.

Various contemporary records state that the Ragland family descended from Richard "Dick" Ragland, born into slavery c.1792 in Chatham County, North Carolina; his son Stephen Ragland (1848–1926) of Jonesboro in Georgia, lived long enough to experience the abolition of slavery in 1865. The family's Ragland surname came from slave-owner William Ragland, a Methodist planter and land speculator who had emigrated during the eighteenth century from Cornwall, United Kingdom, to North America. Her daughter, Meghan Markle, has claimed that a genealogy test revealed that she (Markle) is 43% Nigerian.

== Career and education ==
After leaving Fairfax High School, Ragland worked as a temporary assistant makeup artist on the set of the television show General Hospital, where she met future ex-husband Thomas Markle Sr. She worked as a travel agent and owned a small business. After divorcing Markle, Ragland completed her undergraduate degree, a Bachelor of Arts in psychology. In 2011, she earned a Master of Social Work (MSW) from the University of Southern California. After registering as an Associate Social Worker, she was employed as a social worker for three years at the Didi Hirsch Mental Health Services Clinic in Culver City. Ragland has also worked as a yoga instructor. In 2020, it was reported that she would teach a jewelry making course at Santa Monica College. In the same year, Ragland became CEO, CFO and secretary of a care home firm in Beverly Hills, called Loving Kindness Senior Care Management.

== Personal life ==
Ragland married lighting director Thomas Markle on December 23, 1979, at Hollywood's Paramahansa Yogananda Self-Realization Fellowship Temple in a ceremony performed by Brother Bhaktananda. Their daughter Meghan was born in 1981. They separated when she was two years old. They divorced in 1987.

Ragland resides in View Park–Windsor Hills, California, in a house she inherited from her father in 2011. She has accompanied Meghan to public events and attended her 2018 wedding to Prince Harry at St George's Chapel, Windsor Castle, Berkshire. Ragland became a grandmother on May 6, 2019. She flew to the United Kingdom to see her grandson, Prince Archie of Sussex, and his parents. In July, she attended Archie's christening at the private chapel at Windsor Castle. Her granddaughter, Princess Lilibet of Sussex, was born on June 4, 2021, in Santa Barbara, California.

== See also ==
- "(Almost) Straight Outta Compton", a 2016 tabloid article headline about Meghan Markle and her mother's background
