= Christopher Bouzy =

American tech entrepreneur (born 1975)

- Born: May 22, 1975 (age 50)
- Known for: Bot Sentinel; Spoutible
- Children: 2

Christopher Bouzy (born May 22, 1975) is an American tech entrepreneur known for founding Bot Sentinel, a Twitter analytics service that tracks disinformation, inauthentic behavior and targeted harassment. In 2023, he launched Spoutible, a social media platform.

== Early life ==
Christopher Bouzy was born on May 22, 1975. He grew up in Brownsville, Brooklyn, in what he described as a lower-middle-class upbringing, with his mother, a single parent. His mother was a Black immigrant from Panama, and worked for the New York Telephone Company. Bouzy and his mother shared a residence with his grandmother, two aunts and two cousins.

Bouzy started coding on a Mattel Aquarius computer that his mother bought for him when he was nine years old. He graduated from high school in 1992.

== Career ==
Following his graduation from high school, Bouzy joined the IT department of the New York City Department of Education, using contract coding jobs to supplement his income.

According to his LinkedIn page, Bouzy started out as a computer service technician and founded several firms prior to setting up Bot Sentinel. In the 2000s, Bouzy developed the encryption software Cloak, which Avanquest Software acquired in 2006. Bouzy then developed Nexus Radio, a free platform for recording and playing back radio streams, which was later acquired by an investment group.

Around 2016, Bouzy started teaching himself about machine learning algorithms. He founded Bot Sentinel in 2018, being inspired to do so by the Russian interference in the 2016 United States elections.

Bouzy gained significant public attention through his appearance in the 2022 Netflix docuseries Harry & Meghan, which chronicles the relationship of Prince Harry and Meghan, the Duke and Duchess of Sussex, from their early courtship to their decision to step back as working members of the British royal family and their subsequent activities. In the docuseries, Bouzy asserted that Bot Sentinel found that there were coordinated online campaigns against Meghan, with a significant proportion from a small number of highly active accounts, including organized troll networks and bot accounts.

In February 2023, Bouzy launched Spoutible, a Twitter-like social media platform.

== Legal issues ==
In October 2022, attorney and YouTuber Nathaniel Broughty (also known as NateTheLawyer) sued Bouzy for defamation in Hudson County Superior Court in New Jersey, alleging that he had been incorrectly flagged by Bot Sentinel. According to Broughty's complaint, Bouzy tweeted that Broughty "went from being the son of two crackheads, a drug dealer, a cop, and a prosecutor, to attacking journalists and me on social media", falsely asserted that he was not a real lawyer, derided him as a "Twitter troll and YouTube grifter", and alleged he had admitted to planting evidence on a suspect when he worked as a police officer. Bouzy filed a motion to dismiss the lawsuit. The lawsuit was dismissed in August 2023, with the judge ruling that Broughty's complaint had failed to allege he had been intentionally lied about with the intention of harming him. The lawsuit was dismissed for a final time in April 2024.

In 2023, Bouzy was a co-defendant in a defamation lawsuit filed by conspiracy theorist Jason Goodman. The lawsuit stemmed from Bouzy allegedly insinuating that Goodman might be guilty of sexual assault. The allegation arose after Goodman admitted in a recorded phone call that someone had accused him of sexually assaulting a model. The case was dismissed with prejudice in 2024, and the judge imposed a filing injunction barring any future filings by Goodman against Bouzy in the district without first obtaining leave of court.

== Personal life ==
Bouzy lives in North Bergen, New Jersey, with his wife and son. He also has a daughter. Bouzy and his family have received harassment due to his work on Bot Sentinel. In November 2022, an anonymous tipster emailed the North Bergen police, claiming that a child was screaming in Bouzy's home; the officers dispatched to investigate concluded that Bouzy was the victim of a false report.

Bouzy's mother died in 2021 after being infected with COVID-19 while dealing with cancer. Bouzy said she was afraid to take the COVID-19 vaccine because "she had just heard so many different things [online]", and has cited her memory as part of the reason for being proactive with getting Twitter and other platforms to remove misinformation from their platforms.

=== Views ===
Bouzy was responsible for initiating a discourse on Twitter that criticized Prince William and Catherine, the Prince and Princess of Wales, for their appearance by tweeting that they were "aging in Banana years". In March 2024, Bouzy said that Catherine looked "markedly different" from paparazzi photos published earlier that month. Bouzy was one of many people suggesting that a video of Catherine leaving a farm shop at Windsor Castle was a fake or of someone besides her. Bouzy later denied promoting conspiracy theories about Catherine, saying, "I am speaking for myself, not Harry or Meghan. These are my opinions based on publicly available information."
