= Bridge in Newport Borough =

- U.S. National Register of Historic Places
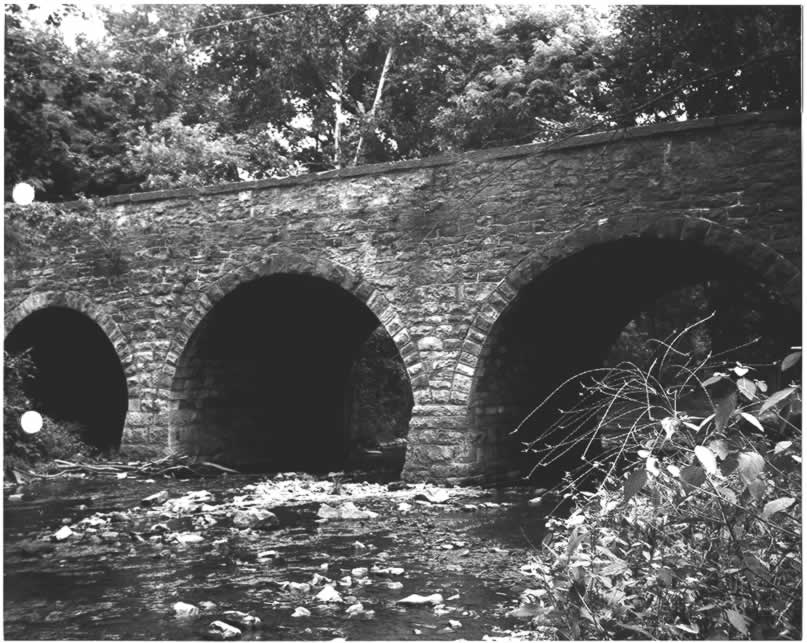
- Side of the bridge

- Location within Pennsylvania Location within the United States
- Location: LR 31 over Little Buffalo Creek, Newport, Pennsylvania
- Coordinates: 40°28′27″N 77°7′48″W
- Area: less than one acre
- Built: 1929
- Architectural style: Multi-span stone arch
- MPS: Highway Bridges Owned by the Commonwealth of Pennsylvania, Department of Transportation TR
- NRHP reference No.: 88000854
- Added to NRHP: June 22, 1988

The Bridge in Newport Borough is a historic bridge located at Newport in Perry County, Pennsylvania. It is an 80-foot-long (24 m) multi-span stone arch bridge. It was built in 1929 and crosses Little Buffalo Creek.

It was listed on the National Register of Historic Places in 1988.
