= Newport, Pennsylvania =

Borough in Pennsylvania, US

- Borough
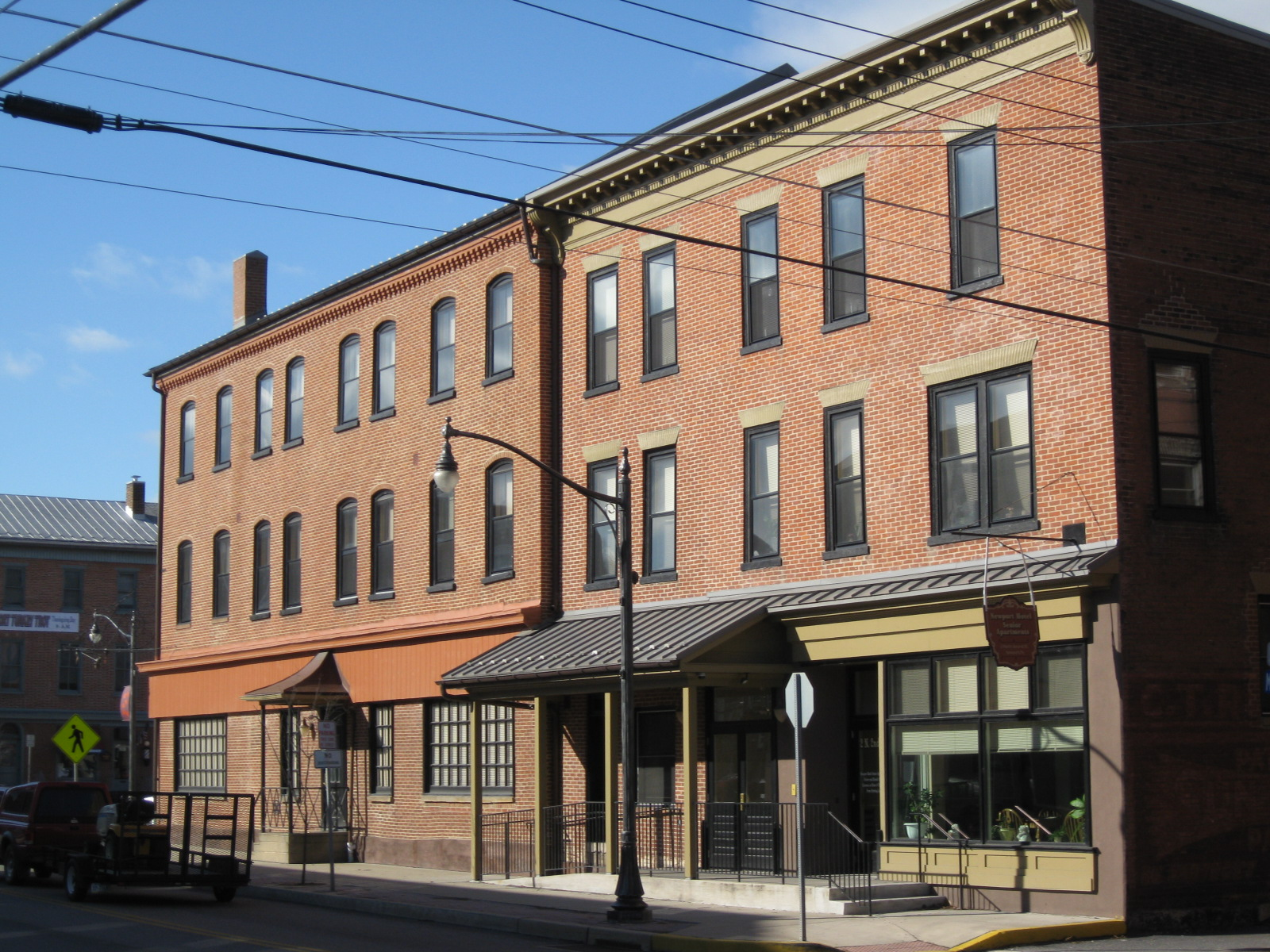
- Newport, Pennsylvania

- Location of Newport in Perry County, Pennsylvania.

- Location within Pennsylvania Location within the United States
- Coordinates: 40°28′42″N 77°08′02″W
- Country: United States
- State: Pennsylvania
- County: Perry
- Settled: 1804
- Incorporated: 1840

Area
  - Total: 0.34 sq mi (0.88 km^{2})
  - Land: 0.30 sq mi (0.78 km^{2})
  - Water: 0.039 sq mi (0.10 km^{2})
- Elevation (benchmark at borough square): 395 ft (120 m)
- Highest elevation (southwest borough boundary): 570 ft (170 m)
- Lowest elevation (Juniata River): 385 ft (117 m)

Population (2020)
  - Total: 1,485
  - Density: 4,931.2/sq mi (1,903.94/km^{2})
- Time zone: UTC−5 (Eastern (EST))
  - Summer (DST): UTC−4 (EDT)
- Zip code: 17074
- Area code: 717
- FIPS code: 42-53968
- Website: https://www.newportboro.com/

Newport is a borough in Perry County, Pennsylvania, United States. The population was 1,487 at the 2020 census. It is part of the Harrisburg–Carlisle Metropolitan Statistical Area.

== History ==
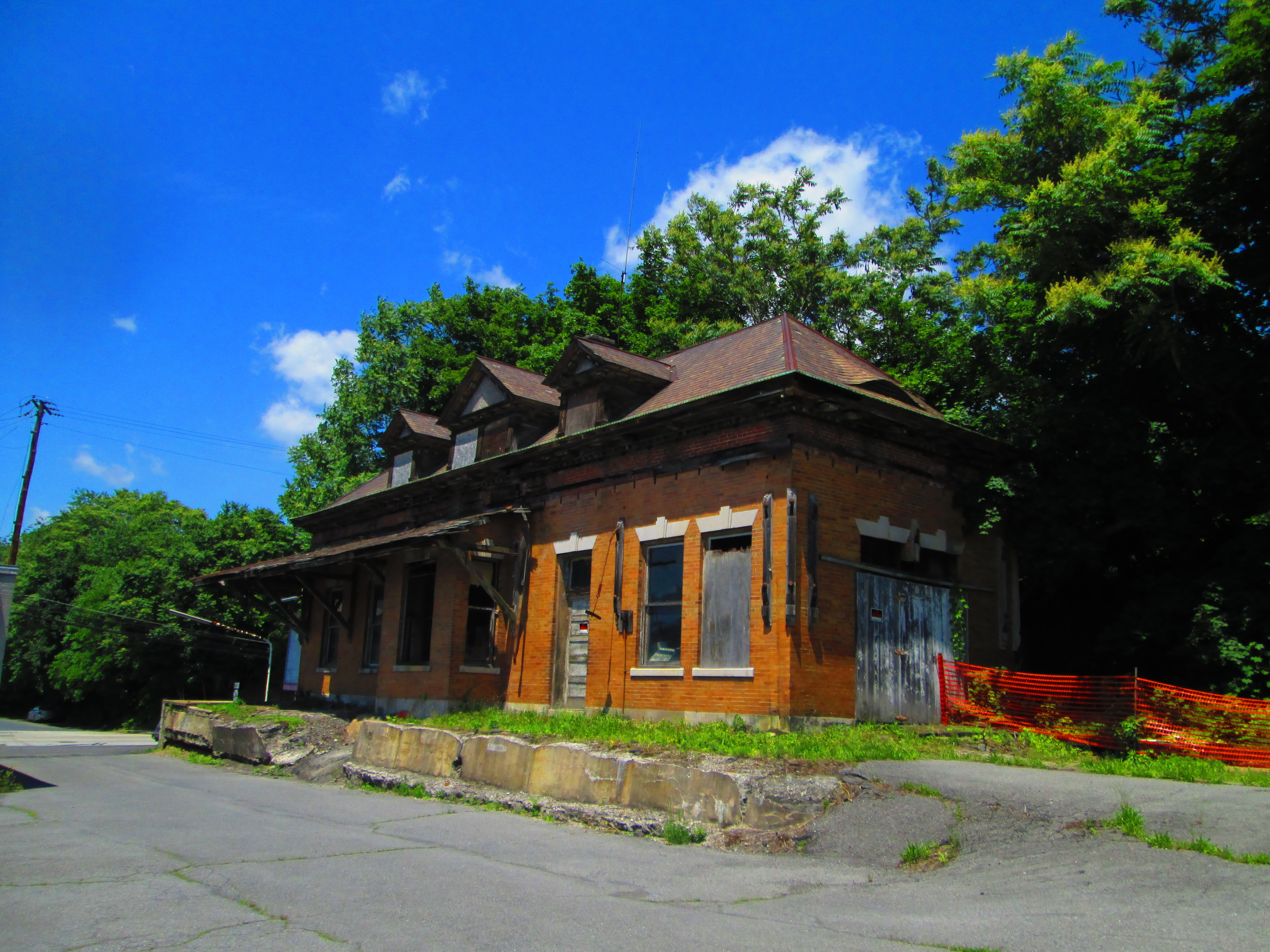
The former Pennsylvania Railroad depot in Newport, alongside PA 34

Newport was originally known as Reider's Ferry—later Reidersville—as it was the site of an early ferry on the Juniata River operated by Paul Jr., Daniel, and John Reider until 1851. The trio had also originally laid down 54 plots and several streets. When the Juniata Division of the Pennsylvania Canal was finished in 1829, the town was officially renamed Newport.

In 1849 the Pennsylvania Railroad had laid tracks through Third Street downtown. The PRR purchased the struggling canal in 1857, but kept the waterways open until 1889 when the Johnstown Flood demolished it. By 1905, the PRR began construction of a new trackline along the former towpath which remains today. There was a small freight yard where railcars and cargo could be transferred to standard gauge, and in 1890 Newport was the eastern end of the Newport and Shermans Valley Railroad.

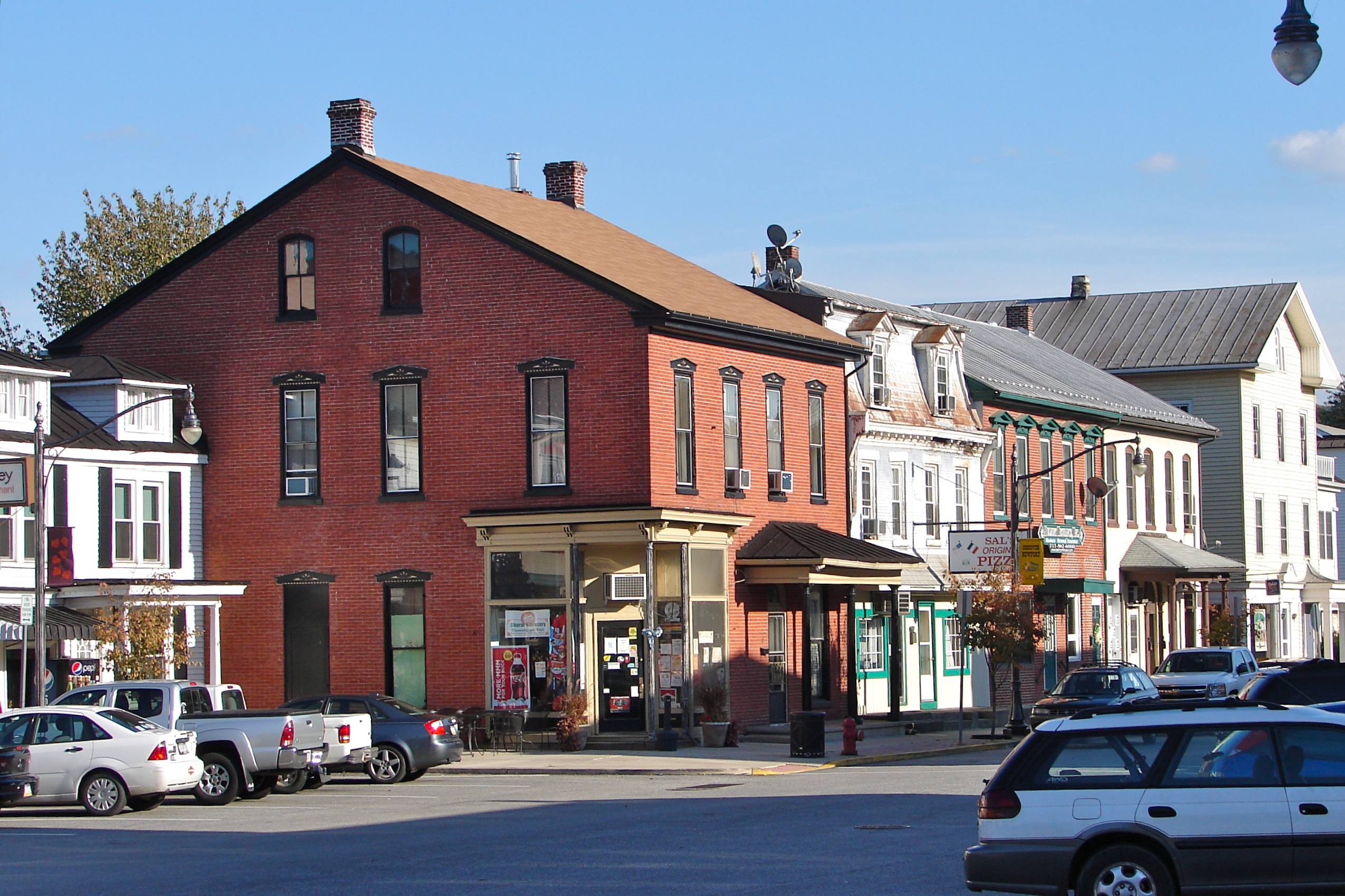
Downtown Newport

Newport once had a large tannery that operated from the second half of the 19th century until the early part of the 20th. The town playground and youth baseball fields now occupy the site.

The Bridge in Newport Borough and Newport Historic District are listed on the National Register of Historic Places.

== Geography ==
Newport is located at 40°28′42″N 77°8′2″W (40.478260, -77.133997).

According to the United States Census Bureau, the borough has a total area of 0.3 square miles (0.78 km^{2}), 90% of it land.

== Demographics ==
Historical population
Census	Pop.	Note	%±
1840	423		—
1850	517		22.2%
1860	649		25.5%
1870	945		45.6%
1880	1,399		48.0%
1890	1,417		1.3%
1900	1,734		22.4%
1910	2,009		15.9%
1920	1,972		−1.8%
1930	1,891		−4.1%
1940	1,897		0.3%
1950	1,893		−0.2%
1960	1,861		−1.7%
1970	1,747		−6.1%
1980	1,600		−8.4%
1990	1,568		−2.0%
2000	1,506		−4.0%
2010	1,574		4.5%
2020	1,485		−5.7%
2021 (est.)	1,492	▲	0.5%

As of the census of 2000, there were 1,506 people, 666 households, and 402 families residing in the borough. The population density was 4,604.8 inhabitants per square mile (1,777.9/km^{2}). There were 743 housing units at an average density of 2,271.8 per square mile (877.1/km^{2}). The racial makeup of the borough was 98.54% White, 0.13% African American, 0.33% Native American, 0.07% Asian, 0.27% from other races, and 0.66% from two or more races. Hispanic or Latino of any race were 0.66% of the population.

Of the 666 households, 29.6% had children under the age of 18 living with them, 45.3% were married couples living together, 10.4% had a female householder with no husband present, and 39.6% were non-families. 35.9% of all households were made up of individuals, and 17.6% had someone living alone who was 65 years of age or older. The average household size was 2.26 and the average family size was 2.91.

In the borough the age distribution of the population shows 25.0% under the age of 18, 7.5% from 18 to 24, 30.1% from 25 to 44, 21.8% from 45 to 64, and 15.5% who were 65 years of age or older. The median age was 36 years. For every 100 females, there were 89.7 males. For every 100 females age 18 and over, there were 83.0 males.

The median income for a household in the borough was $31,594, and the median income for a family was $39,545. Males had a median income of $31,413 versus $22,344 for females. The per capita income for the borough was $16,818. About 6.8% of families and 10.0% of the population were below the poverty line, including 10.1% of those under age 18 and 11.4% of those age 65 or over.

== High school ==
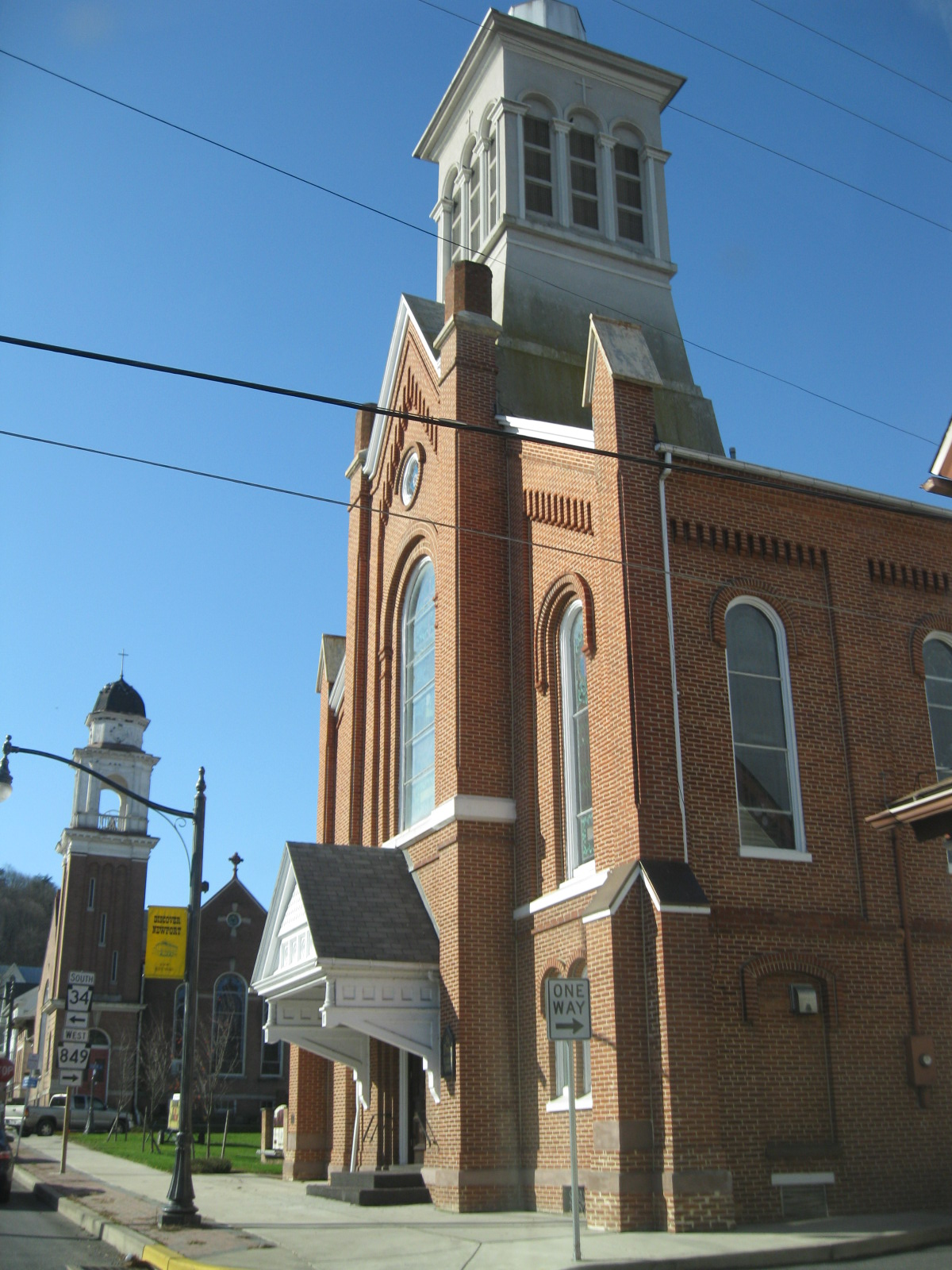
St. Paul Lutheran Church (foreground) and former Newport Methodist Church

The Newport High School, part of the Newport School District serves the borough and several surrounding townships and is located at the northwest corner of town. It was remodeled in 2007. The school's nickname is the Buffaloes, whose athletic field is named in honor of George Katchmer, who coached the school to their only undefeated campaign in 1953. The field is dual purpose and is used for football and baseball.

== Notable people ==
- Billy Cox, Major League Baseball infielder. The baseball field is named after him. He played third base for the Pittsburgh Pirates, Brooklyn Dodgers and Baltimore Orioles in the 1940s and 1950s.
- John W. Hetrick, Engineer who invented the airbag
- Thomas Markle, Lighting director and father of Meghan, Duchess of Sussex
