= Lampertsloch =

Lampertsloch Làmpertschloch
- Commune
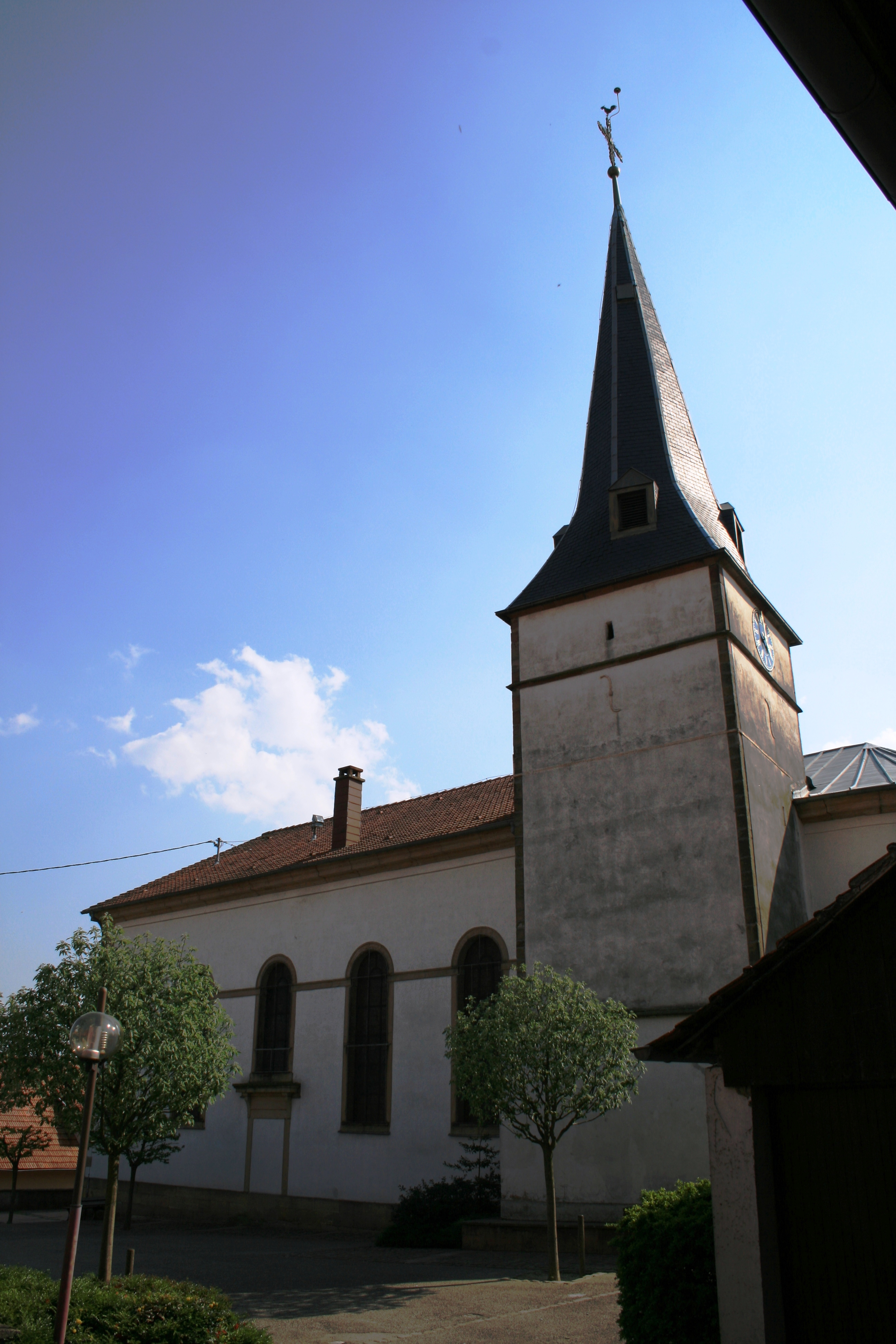
- The church in Lampertsloch

- Coat of arms
- Location of Lampertsloch
- Location within France Location within Grand Est
- Coordinates: 48°57′32″N 7°49′02″E
- Country: France
- Region: Grand Est
- Department: Bas-Rhin
- Arrondissement: Haguenau-Wissembourg
- Canton: Reichshoffen

Government
  - Mayor (2020–2026): Dany Walter
- Area^{1}: 10.43 km^{2} (4.03 sq mi)
- Highest elevation: 511 m (1,677 ft)
- Lowest elevation: 157 m (515 ft)
- Population (2023): 696
  - Density: 66.7/km^{2} (173/sq mi)
- Time zone: UTC+01:00 (CET)
  - Summer (DST): UTC+02:00 (CEST)
- INSEE/Postal code: 67257 /67250
- ^{1} French Land Register data, which excludes lakes, ponds, glaciers > 1 km^{2} (0.386 sq mi or 247 acres) and river estuaries.

Lampertsloch is a commune in the Bas-Rhin department in Grand Est in north-eastern France. It is located less than nine kilometres (5.6 miles) from the French–German border.

The commune is part of the Parc naturel régional des Vosges du Nord.

Lampersloch was historically a German-speaking town. In the Middle Ages it was part of the lordship of Lichtenberg, a small German territory within the Holy Roman Empire. By marriage it later became part of the County of Zweibrücken-Bitsch, another German territory. In 1570 it became part of the County of Hanau-Lichtenberg, which was also a German territory. Immediately afterwards, the ruler, Philipp V of Hanau-Lichtenberg, made the territory officially Lutheran. During the reign of Louis XIV of France the territory came under French dominance, although it continued to be ruled by the counts of Hanau. After the death of the last Hanau count, Johann Reinhard III, the county was inherited by the son of his only daughter Charlotte, the hereditary prince and later Landgrave of the Landgraviate of Hesse-Darmstadt, Ludwig IX. Following the French Revolution the area was annexed by France. In 1871 it reverted to being part of Germany, and after the First World War it again became part of France. While the area was occupied by Germany from 1940 until the liberation of France from Nazi occupation in the Second World war, it was not formally annexed.

== See also ==
- Communes of the Bas-Rhin department
