= (Almost) Straight Outta Compton =

Headline from 2016 MailOnline article

(Almost) straight outta Compton is part of a headline from a 2016 article written by Ruth Styles and published by the MailOnline, the website of the British tabloid newspaper the Daily Mail. The headline has been criticised and described as being an example of racist press commentary towards the American former actress Meghan Markle, prior to marrying the British Prince Harry.

== Origin ==
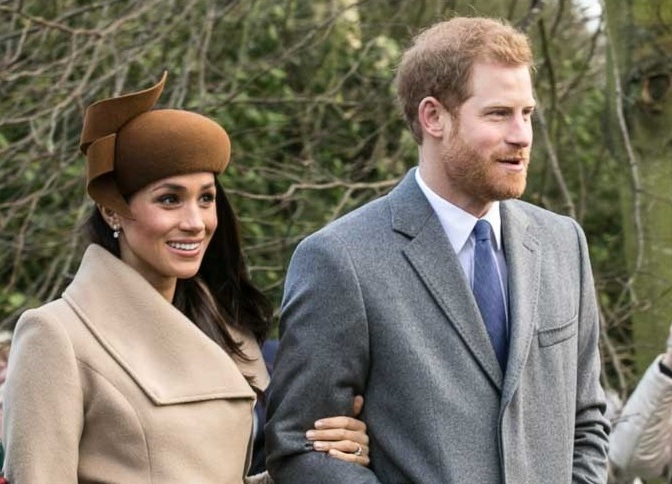
Markle and Prince Harry on Christmas Day, 2017

The November 2016 MailOnline article is about the inferred family background of American actress Meghan Markle (born 1981) and her upbringing in the Los Angeles district of Crenshaw with her mother, Doria Ragland. It was published after Markle began dating Prince Harry. The full headline is: "Harry's girl is (almost) straight outta Compton: Gang-scarred home of her mother revealed—so will he be dropping by for tea?". It was also published on 2 November 2016 in a byline given to Ruth Styles "in Los Angeles for Dailymail.com". Crenshaw is portrayed in the article as having a high crime rate with the first paragraph stating that "Plagued by crime and riddled with street gangs, the troubled Los Angeles neighborhood that Doria Ragland, 60, calls home couldn't be more different to London's leafy Kensington. But social worker Ragland might now find herself welcoming a royal guest to downtrodden Crenshaw after Prince Harry was revealed to be dating her daughter—Suits actress Meghan Markle".

The headline references the 1988 song "Straight Outta Compton", the debut record by the American gangsta rap hip hop group N.W.A. The city of Compton in southern Los Angeles County, California, was historically associated with gang violence. Compton is located 14 miles from Crenshaw, the area profiled in the article. A separate article by the British tabloid the Daily Star had a headline querying whether Harry would "marry into gangster royalty?".

Markle grew up in the 1980s and 1990s. She became engaged to Prince Harry in 2017. Upon their marriage in 2018, she became the Duchess of Sussex. Their son, Archie Mountbatten-Windsor, was born in 2019. The following year, the couple stepped down as senior members of the royal family, moving to Canada and then to the Duchess's native Southern California.

In reaction to the March 2021 Oprah with Meghan and Harry television interview with Oprah Winfrey, Finlay Greig wrote in the Edinburgh Evening News that the headline insinuates that Meghan comes from a "life of crime", despite being brought up in a middle class area, which had suffered significant damage from both the 1992 Los Angeles riots and the 1994 Northridge earthquake, but was able to rebound in the late 2000s with the help of redevelopment and gentrification. The 2016 "(Almost) Straight Outta Compton" article also captioned a picture: "Prince Harry's new girl, Meghan Markle, grew up in this house in Crenshaw, Los Angeles, a troubled area that had 47 crimes in the past week—including murder."

== Reaction ==
The tone of this and other articles prompted Prince Harry's Communications Secretary to issue a statement that deplored the "racist" and "sexist" commentary and coverage received by Meghan. The statement described Meghan as having been "...subject to a wave of abuse and harassment. Some of this has been very public—the smear on the front page of a national newspaper; the racial undertones of comment pieces; and the outright sexism and racism of social media trolls and web article comments". The statement described Harry as worried about Meghan's safety and concluded that he had asked for the statement "to be issued in the hopes that those in the press who have been driving this story can pause and reflect before any further damage is done".

The Los Angeles Times clarified that the area "described by the British press as Crenshaw" was, in reality, the "more upscale" area of Baldwin Hills. Writing for BBC News in September 2017, Regan Morris wrote that "When one newspaper dubbed Markle '(Almost) Straight Outta Compton' last year, there was an outcry" and that "If you read the British tabloid press you would think the actress grew up in LA's notorious gang culture and was lucky to escape a life of crime". In a January 2020 opinion piece for The New York Times, published in the wake of 'Megxit', the writer and broadcaster Afua Hirsch wrote that "From the very first headline about her being '(almost) straight outta Compton' and having 'exotic' DNA, the racist treatment of Meghan has been impossible to ignore".

The headline was highlighted in the reaction to Meghan and Harry's interview with Oprah Winfrey in March 2021. Hanna Ziady wrote for CNN that "The first round of headlines back in 2016 played on harmful stereotypes and helped set the tone for how parts of the UK media, and especially its tabloid newspapers, would treat this newcomer to the royal family who stood out in one very obvious way: her race". Activist and lawyer Shola Mos-Shogbamimu wrote for The Guardian that she "[could not] believe that we are still having this debate about whether the way that Meghan has been treated is racist. It is misogynoir, pure and simple. Look at the media coverage of her. The Daily Mail said that she was "(almost) straight outta Compton"....That tells you what kind of society we live in". The headline was raised in an interview by Victoria Derbyshire with Ian Murray, the head of the Society of Editors. Derbyshire asked Murray if the headline was bigoted or racist, Murray replied that it was "disputed" as to whether the headline was offensive and said that it was "not acceptable" to describe sections of the British press as "bigoted". Murray described the article as a "rags to riches" story.

Murray has since stepped down from the Society of Editors after releasing a statement headlined: "UK media not bigoted: SoE responds to Sussexes' claims of racism", denying racism and bigotry in the UK press. The statement received an immediate backlash in the form of an open letter signed by over 250 "journalists of colour from the Guardian, Metro, the New York Times, the BBC and others", calling the initial statement "laughable" proof of "an institution and an industry in denial".

== See also ==
- Megxit, the 2020 withdrawal of the Duke and Duchess of Sussex from royal duties
- Oprah with Meghan and Harry, the couple's 2021 American television interview with Oprah Winfrey
