= Prince Harry, Duke of Sussex =

British prince (born 1984)

Prince Harry
- Duke of Sussex (more)
- Harry in 2026
- Born: Prince Henry of Wales; 15 September 1984 (age 42); St Mary's Hospital, London, England
- Spouse: Meghan Markle (m. 2018)
- Issue: Prince Archie of Sussex; Princess Lilibet of Sussex
Names
- Henry Charles Albert David (Note: As a member of the royal family entitled to be called His Royal Highness, Harry does not normally use a surname. When it is needed, the surname is Mountbatten-Windsor. In his military career, he was known as Captain Wales. According to letters patent of February 1960, his house and family name is Windsor.)
- House: Windsor
- Father: Charles III
- Mother: Diana Spencer

- Military career
- Allegiance: United Kingdom
- Branch: British Army
- Years of active service: 2005–2015
- Rank: See list
- Service number: 564673
- Units: Blues and Royals; 662 Squadron; 3 Regiment; Army Air Corps
- Conflicts: War in Afghanistan; Operation Herrick
- Awards: Operational Service Medal for Afghanistan

Prince Harry, Duke of Sussex (Note: He was officially styled Prince Henry of Wales from birth until his marriage, but is known as Prince Harry. "Harry" is a diminutive form of "Henry".) (Henry Charles Albert David; born 15 September 1984), is a member of the British royal family. He is the younger son of King Charles III and Diana, Princess of Wales, and is fifth in the line of succession to the British throne.

Harry was born during the reign of his paternal grandmother, Queen Elizabeth II. He was educated at Wetherby School, Ludgrove School, and Eton College, before completing officer training at the Royal Military Academy Sandhurst. Harry was commissioned as a cornet in the Blues and Royals and served briefly alongside his elder brother, Prince William. He was deployed twice on active service in Afghanistan: for ten weeks in Helmand Province during 2007–2008, and for twenty weeks with the Army Air Corps in 2012–2013. Inspired by the Warrior Games in the United States, Harry founded the Invictus Games in 2014 and remains actively involved as its patron. In 2016, together with his brother William and sister-in-law Catherine, he co-founded the mental health awareness initiative Heads Together.

In 2018, Harry was created Duke of Sussex ahead of his wedding to American actress Meghan Markle. The couple have two children, Archie and Lilibet. In January 2020, Harry and Meghan stepped back from their roles as working members of the royal family and relocated to Southern California. They subsequently established Archewell Inc., a Beverly Hills–based organisation encompassing both commercial and charitable ventures. In March 2021, Harry and Meghan gave a widely publicised interview to Oprah Winfrey on Oprah with Meghan and Harry. In December 2022, they appeared in the Netflix documentary series Harry & Meghan. In 2023, Harry published his memoir, Spare. In August 2026, he and Meghan relocated to the UK with their children, without plans to resume public duties as working members of the royal family.

== Early life ==
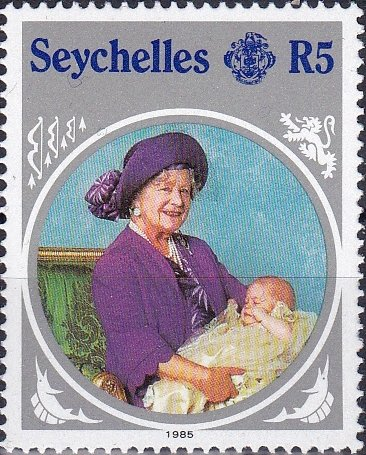
A 1985 Seychellois stamp depicting Harry with his great-grandmother Queen Elizabeth the Queen Mother at his christening

Harry was born on 15 September 1984 at St Mary's Hospital, London, during the reign of his paternal grandmother, Queen Elizabeth II. He is the second child of Charles, Prince of Wales (later King Charles III), and his first wife, Diana, Princess of Wales. (Note: Rumours that Harry is the son of James Hewitt, with whom his mother had an affair, have been denied by Hewitt. Hewitt said, "I must state once and for all that I'm not Harry's father. When I met Diana, he was already a toddler." Diana's police bodyguard Ken Wharfe and her butler Paul Burrell agreed that Hewitt and Diana did not meet until after Harry's birth.) He was christened Henry Charles Albert David on 21 December at St George's Chapel, Windsor Castle, by Robert Runcie, then archbishop of Canterbury. (Note: Harry had six godparents: Prince Andrew (his paternal uncle); Lady Sarah Armstrong-Jones (his paternal first cousin once removed); Carolyn Bartholomew (née Pride); Bryan Organ (a British artist); Gerald Ward (a former officer in the Household Cavalry); and Celia, Lady Vestey (née Knight).) From childhood he was known as "Harry" to family, friends, and the public, and was nicknamed "Harold" by his elder brother, William.

Harry and William were raised at Kensington Palace in London, and at Highgrove House in Gloucestershire. Diana sought to give her sons a broader range of experiences and a clearer understanding of ordinary life than previous generations of royal children. She took them to places ranging from Walt Disney World and McDonald's to AIDS clinics and homeless shelters. Harry began accompanying his parents on official visits at an early age; his first overseas tour was to Italy in 1985. He later travelled with his family to Canada in 1991 and 1998.

Harry's parents divorced in 1996. The following year, his mother died in a car crash in Paris while he and William were staying with their father at Balmoral Castle. Charles informed his sons of her death. At Diana's funeral, Harry, then aged 12, walked behind the cortège from Kensington Palace to Westminster Abbey alongside his father, his brother, his paternal grandfather, Prince Philip, Duke of Edinburgh, and his maternal uncle Charles Spencer, 9th Earl Spencer.

Harry and William inherited the "bulk" of the £12.9 million left by their mother on their 30th birthdays, a sum that had increased to about £10 million each by 2014. In the same year, they inherited Diana's wedding dress and many of her personal possessions, including dresses, diamond tiaras, jewellery, letters, and paintings. They also received the original lyrics and score of "Candle in the Wind", by Bernie Taupin and Elton John, as performed by John at Diana's funeral.

In 2002, The Times reported that Harry would share with his brother a £4.9 million distribution from trust funds established by their great-grandmother Queen Elizabeth the Queen Mother on their 21st birthdays, followed by a further £8 million on their 40th birthdays. It was also reported that Harry would inherit the larger share of the money left by the Queen Mother for the two brothers, as William is expected to ascend the throne and receive additional financial benefits.

== Education ==
Like his father and brother, Harry was educated at private schools. He began at London's Jane Mynors' nursery school and the pre-preparatory Wetherby School. He then attended Ludgrove School in Berkshire. After passing entrance exams, he was admitted to Eton College. The decision to send him to Eton departed from the past practice of the Mountbatten-Windsors, who traditionally sent their children to Gordonstoun, which his grandfather, father, two uncles, and two cousins had attended. Harry instead followed his brother and the Spencer family tradition, as his maternal grandfather and uncle had attended Eton. As with William, the royal family and the tabloid press agreed that Harry would be allowed to study free from intrusion in exchange for occasional photograph opportunities, in what became known as the "pressure cooker agreement".

In June 2003, Harry completed his education at Eton with two A-Levels, achieving a grade B in art and a D in geography, having decided to drop history of art after AS level. He has been described as "a top tier athlete", having played competitive polo and rugby union. One of his former teachers, Sarah Forsyth, described him as a "weak student" and alleged that staff at Eton had conspired to help him cheat in examinations. Both Eton and Harry denied the allegations. A tribunal made no ruling on the cheating claim, but it "accepted the prince had received help in preparing his A-level 'expressive' project, which he needed to pass to secure his place at Sandhurst." While at Eton, Harry joined the Combined Cadet Force and was made a cadet officer in his final year, leading the corps' annual parade at the Eton tattoo.

After leaving school, Harry took a gap year, during which he spent time in Australia working as a jackaroo on a cattle station and taking part in the Young England vs Young Australia Polo Test match. He also travelled to Lesotho, where he worked with orphaned children and produced the documentary film The Forgotten Kingdom: Prince Harry in Lesotho.

== Military career ==
=== Sandhurst; Blues and Royals; deployment to Afghanistan ===
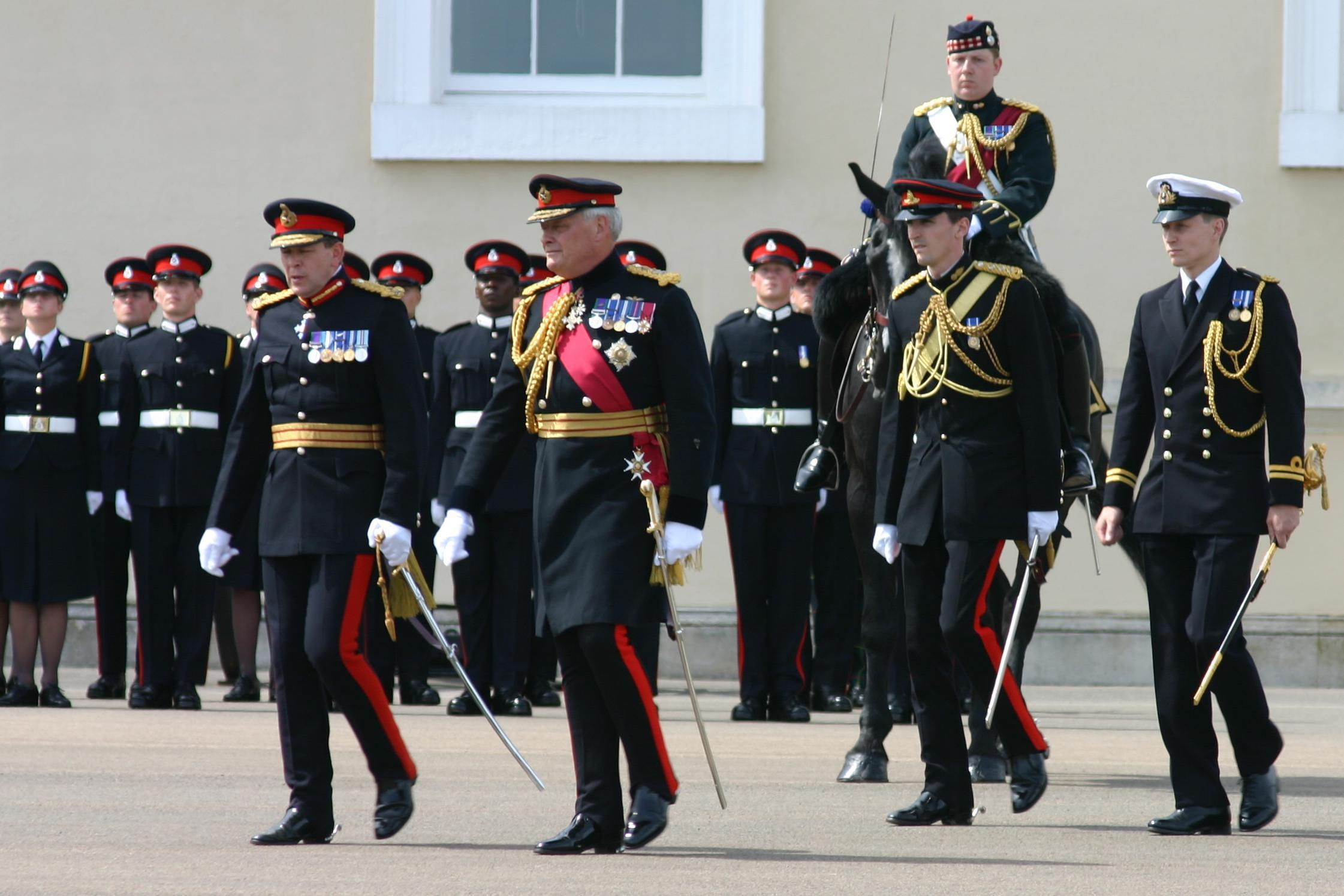
Officer Cadet Wales (standing next to the horse) on parade at Sandhurst, 21 June 2005

Harry passed the Regular Commissions Board (RCB) in September 2004 and entered the Royal Military Academy Sandhurst on 8 May 2005, where he was known as Officer Cadet Wales and joined Alamein Company. His entry into the academy had been delayed for four months while he recovered from an injury to his left knee. In April 2006, he completed his officer training and was commissioned as a Cornet (second lieutenant) in the Blues and Royals, a regiment of the Household Cavalry in the British Army. On 13 April 2008, after reaching two years' seniority, he was promoted to lieutenant.

In 2006, it was announced that Harry's unit was scheduled to be deployed to Iraq the following year. A public debate followed over whether he should serve there. In April 2006, the Ministry of Defence stated that Harry would be shielded from the front line if his unit went to war, with a spokeswoman noting that he was expected to "undertake the fullest range of deployments", but that his role required monitoring because "his overt presence might attract additional attention" that could endanger him or those he commanded. Defence Secretary John Reid argued that he should be allowed to serve on the front line. Harry agreed, saying, "If they said 'no, you can't go front line' then I wouldn't drag my sorry ass through Sandhurst and I wouldn't be where I am now." Harry completed the Troop Leaders' Course in October 2006 and rejoined his regiment in Windsor, where he was given command of a troop of 11 soldiers and four Scimitar reconnaissance vehicles. On 22 February 2007, the Ministry of Defence and Clarence House jointly announced that Harry would be deployed with his regiment to Iraq as part of the 1st Mechanised Brigade of the 3rd Mechanised Division – a move supported by Harry, who had said he would leave the army if ordered to remain in safety while his regiment went to war.

General Sir Richard Dannatt, the head of the British Army, said on 30 April 2007 that he had personally decided Harry would serve with his unit in Iraq as a troop commander, and he was scheduled for deployment in May or June 2007 to patrol the Maysan Governorate. By 16 May, however, Dannatt announced that Harry would not serve in Iraq; concerns included his status as a high-value target – several threats had already been made against him – and the risks this posed to the soldiers around him should any attempt be made on his life or if he were captured. Clarence House said that Harry was disappointed by the decision, though he said he would abide by it.

In the summer of 2007, Harry trained as a joint terminal attack controller at RAF Leeming. In early June 2007, it was reported that he had arrived in Canada to train alongside soldiers of the Canadian Forces and the British Army at CFB Suffield near Medicine Hat, Alberta, in preparation for a possible deployment to Afghanistan, where Canadian and British forces were serving in the NATO-led Afghan War. This was confirmed in February 2008 when the Ministry of Defence revealed that Harry had been secretly deployed as a joint terminal attack controller to Helmand Province in Afghanistan for the previous ten weeks. The revelation followed breaches of the media blackout by Bild and New Idea. He was immediately withdrawn due to concerns that the publicity would endanger him and fellow soldiers. Harry returned on a flight carrying servicemen injured by an IED, including Ben McBean. It was later reported that Harry had helped Gurkha troops repel an attack by Taliban insurgents, and had carried out patrol duties in hostile areas while in Afghanistan.

Harry's tour made him the first member of the British royal family to serve in a war zone since his uncle Prince Andrew, who flew helicopters during the Falklands War. For Harry's service, his aunt Princess Anne presented him with the Operational Service Medal for Afghanistan at Combermere Barracks in May 2008.

=== Army Air Corps and second deployment to Afghanistan ===
In October 2008, it was announced that Harry would follow his brother, father, and uncle, in learning to fly military helicopters. He attended the Defence Helicopter Flying School at RAF Shawbury, where he joined his brother. Harry initially failed his pilot's theory test in February 2009. Prince Charles presented him with his flying brevet (wings) on 7 May 2010 at a ceremony at the Army Air Corps Base (AAC) at Middle Wallop. Harry was awarded his Apache Flying Badge on 14 April 2011. On 16 April, it was announced that he had been promoted to captain. In June 2011, Clarence House announced that Harry would be available for deployment in current operations in Afghanistan as an Apache helicopter pilot. The final decision rested with the Ministry of Defence's senior commanders, principally the Chief of the Defence Staff, in consultation with the wishes of Harry, the Prince of Wales, and the Queen.

In October 2011, Harry was transferred to a United States military base in California to complete his helicopter gunship training. This final phase included live-fire training and "environmental and judgment training" at naval and air force facilities in California and Arizona. Later that month, it was reported that he had finished top of his class in extensive training undertaken at the Naval Air Facility, El Centro, California. While training in Southern California, Harry also spent time in San Diego. In November 2011, he returned to England and went to Wattisham Airfield in Suffolk to complete his training to fly Apache helicopters.

Around 2012, Harry was trained in skydiving by the Red Devils. On 7 September 2012, Harry arrived at Camp Bastion in southern Afghanistan as part of the 100-strong 662 Squadron, 3 Regiment, Army Air Corps, to begin a four-month combat tour as a co-pilot and gunner for an Apache helicopter. On 10 September, within days of his arrival, it was reported that the Taliban had threatened his life. On 18 September, Harry was moved to a safe location after a Taliban attack on Camp Bastion that killed two US marines. Defence Secretary Philip Hammond stated that "additional security arrangements" had been put in place because Harry could be a potential target, but added that he would face "the same risk as any other Apache pilot" while in combat.

Files later obtained about the incident quoted Major General Gregg A. Sturdevant as saying "The night of the attack, he slept through the entire thing. We didn't do anything special for him. He came and went, and you never would have known he was there" and, "The only thing special we did for him was we had a place identified as a safe house in case the base came under attack." On 21 January 2013, it was announced that Harry was returning from a 20-week deployment in Afghanistan. On 8 July 2013, the Ministry of Defence announced that he had successfully qualified as an Apache aircraft commander. Harry compared operating the Apache's weapons systems in Afghanistan to playing video games.

Harry wrote in his 2023 memoir Spare that he flew on six missions that resulted in him killing 25 Taliban members, writing that he felt he had been trained not to view them as "people" but as "chess pieces" removed from the board. He added, "It's not a number that gave me any satisfaction. But neither was it a number that made me feel ashamed." Following the publication of the memoir, Pen Farthing, a British former Royal Marines commando and founder of the Nowzad Dogs charity, was evacuated from Kabul on 6 January 2023 to avoid "potential reprisal attacks on ex-forces people". Harry's account drew criticism from Taliban members, British politicians, and military figures.

=== HQ London District and Invictus Games ===
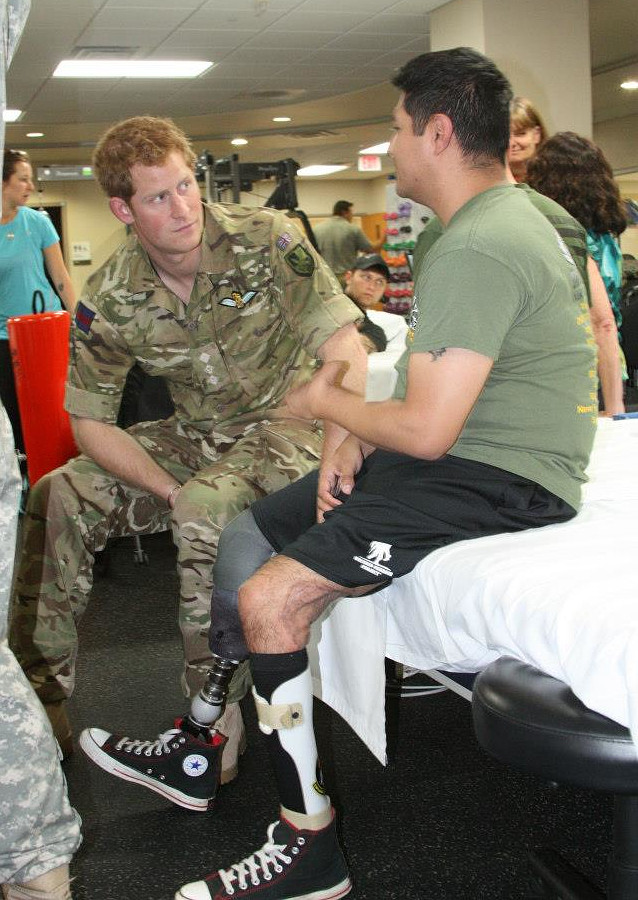
Harry (left) talking to an injured soldier at the Walter Reed National Military Medical Center, Bethesda, Maryland, US; 15 May 2013

On 17 January 2014, the Ministry of Defence announced that Harry had completed his attachment to 3 Regiment Army Air Corps and would take up a staff officer role, SO3 (Defence Engagement), in HQ London District. His responsibilities included helping to coordinate significant projects and commemorative events involving the Army in London. He was based at Horse Guards in central London.

On 6 March 2014, Harry launched the Invictus Games, a Paralympic-style sporting event for injured servicemen and women, which was held from 10 to 14 September 2014. He met prospective British competitors for the Games at Tedworth House in Wiltshire on 29 April 2014 for the start of the selection process. On 15 May 2014, Harry attended a ticket-sale launch for the Invictus Games at the BT Tower, from where he tweeted on the Games' official Twitter account as its president. To promote the event, he was interviewed by BBC Radio 2's Chris Evans alongside two Invictus Games hopefuls. He said, "[The Invictus Games] is basically my full-time job at the moment, making sure that we pull this off." The programme aired on 31 July 2014. Harry later wrote an article in The Sunday Times about his experiences in Afghanistan, explaining how they had inspired him to support injured personnel and how, after attending the Warrior Games, he had vowed to create the Invictus Games. Harry and officials attended the British Armed Forces team announcement for the Games at Potters Field Park in August 2014. As president of the Invictus Games, he attended all events related to the competition from 8 to 14 September 2014.

In January 2015, it was reported that Harry would take on a new role supporting wounded service personnel by working alongside members of the London District's Personal Recovery Unit for the MOD's Defence Recovery Capability scheme, ensuring that wounded personnel had adequate recovery plans. The palace later confirmed that the scheme had been established in partnership with Help for Heroes and the Royal British Legion. In late January 2015, Harry visited The Battle Back Centre set up by the Royal British Legion, and Fisher House UK at the Queen Elizabeth Hospital Birmingham. The Centre was created through a partnership between Help for Heroes, the Fisher House Foundation, and the Queen Elizabeth Hospital Birmingham (QEHB) Charity. The Fisher House Foundation is one of the Invictus Games' sponsors. In February and March 2015, Harry visited Phoenix House in Catterick Garrison, North Yorkshire, a recovery centre run by Help for Heroes. He also visited Merville Barracks in Colchester, where Chavasse VC House Personnel Recovery Centre is located, run by Help for Heroes in partnership with the Ministry of Defence and Royal British Legion.

=== Secondment to Australian Defence Force ===
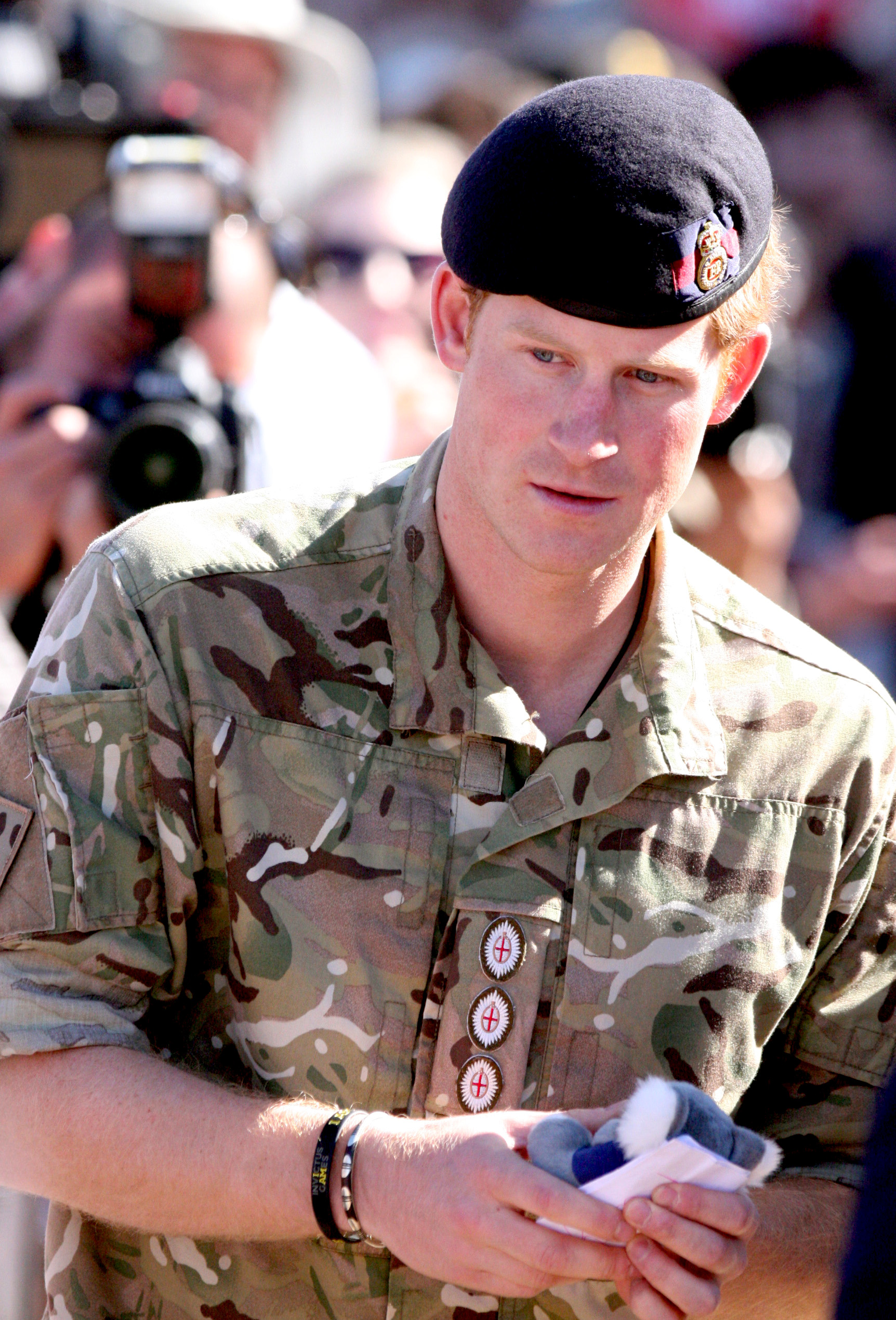
In New South Wales, May 2015

On 17 March 2015, Kensington Palace announced that Harry would leave the Armed Forces in June. Before then, he would spend four weeks across April and May at army barracks in Darwin, Perth, and Sydney while seconded to the Australian Defence Force (ADF). After leaving the Army, and while considering his future, he would return to work in a voluntary capacity with the Ministry of Defence, supporting Case Officers in the Ministry's Recovery Capability Programme. He would work with both those who administer and those who receive physical and mental care within the London District area.

On 6 April 2015, Harry reported for duty to Australia's Chief of the Defence Force, Air Chief Marshal Mark Binskin, at the Royal Military College, Duntroon, in Canberra. Harry flew to Darwin later that day to begin his month-long secondment to the ADF's 1st Brigade. His visit included detachments to NORFORCE as well as to an aviation unit. While in Perth, he trained with the Special Air Service Regiment (SASR), participating in the SASR selection course, including a fitness test and a physical training session with SASR selection candidates. He also joined SASR for live-fire shooting exercises with various Special Forces weapons at a variety of ranges. Harry completed an insertion-training exercise using a rigid-hull inflatable boat. In Sydney, he undertook urban-operations training with the 2nd Commando Regiment. Training activities included remotely detonating an Improvised Explosive Device (IED) and abseiling from a building. He also spent time flying over Sydney as co-pilot of an Army Black Hawk helicopter and participated in counter-terrorism training in Sydney Harbour with Royal Australian Navy clearance divers.

Harry's attachment to the ADF ended on 8 May 2015, and on 19 June 2015 he resigned his short service commission.

=== Post-military service ===
In 2021, Harry described his 10 years (2005–2015) in the army as "the happiest times in my life". Since leaving the army, he has remained closely involved with the armed forces through the Invictus Games, honorary military appointments, and other official engagements. On 19 December 2017, he succeeded his grandfather Prince Philip as Captain General Royal Marines. In May 2018, he was promoted to the substantive ranks of Lieutenant Commander in the Royal Navy, Major of the British Army, and Squadron Leader in the Royal Air Force.

On 18 January 2020, Buckingham Palace announced that an agreement had been reached for Harry "to step back from Royal duties, including official military appointments". In February 2021, the Palace confirmed that Harry would give up his position as Captain General Royal Marines and relinquish all his other honorary military appointments.

In January 2026, Harry said that the sacrifices of NATO troops in Afghanistan must be spoken about "truthfully and with respect", emphasising that allied forces had fought on the front lines and had paid a heavy price. His remarks followed comments by US president Donald Trump, who claimed that allies had stayed "a little back" and questioned whether the alliance would support the US if required.

== Personal life ==
=== Bachelorhood ===
Chelsy Davy, the daughter of Zimbabwean-born, South Africa-based businessman Charles Davy, was referred to as Harry's girlfriend in an interview conducted for his 21st birthday. Harry said he "would love to tell everyone how amazing she is but once I start talking about that, I have left myself open.... There is truth and there is lies and unfortunately I cannot get the truth across." Davy was present when Harry received his Operational Service Medal for Afghanistan and also attended his graduation ceremony when he received his flying wings from his father. In early 2009, it was reported that the pair had parted ways after a relationship that had lasted for five years.

In his 2023 memoir, Harry stated that months after breaking up with Davy he was introduced to Caroline Flack, whom he described as "funny", "sweet", and "cool". The two saw each other for a while before press intrusion "tainted" their relationship "irredeemably", according to Harry. Flack also discussed the relationship in her autobiography.

In May 2012, Harry's cousin Princess Eugenie introduced him to Cressida Bonas, an actress and model who is the granddaughter of Edward Curzon, 6th Earl Howe. On 30 April 2014, it was reported that the couple had parted amicably.

=== Marriage and family ===
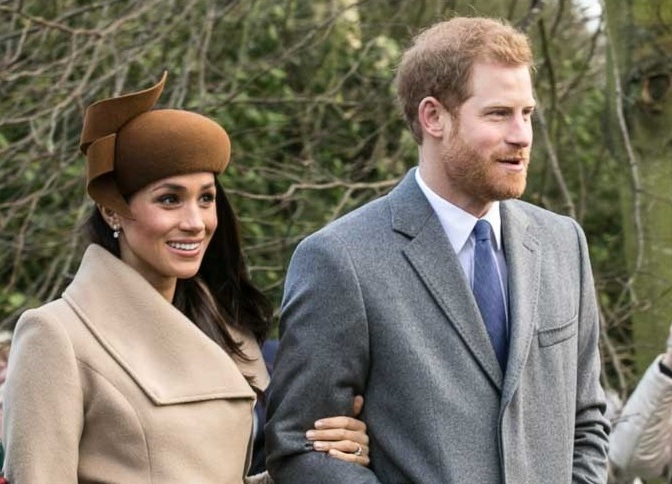
With Markle on Christmas Day, 2017

In mid-2016, Harry began a relationship with American actress Meghan Markle. According to the couple, they first connected via Instagram, though they have also said that they were set up on a blind date by a mutual friend in July 2016. On 8 November, eight days after the relationship was made public by the press, Harry directed his communications secretary to release a statement on his behalf expressing concern about pejorative and false comments made about his girlfriend by mainstream media and internet trolls. In September 2017, Harry and Markle made their first public appearance together at the Invictus Games in Toronto. Their engagement was announced on 27 November 2017 by Harry's father. The announcement prompted generally positive commentary about having a mixed‑race person as a member of the royal family, particularly in Commonwealth countries with populations of blended or native ancestry.

On the morning of the wedding, Queen Elizabeth II conferred the title of Duke of Sussex upon Harry; Markle became Duchess of Sussex through her marriage to him later that day. The ceremony was held at St George's Chapel, Windsor Castle on 19 May 2018. The couple later revealed in the 2021 television interview Oprah with Meghan and Harry that, three days before the ceremony, they had privately exchanged vows in their garden in the presence of the Archbishop of Canterbury. This earlier exchange of vows was not an official religious or legally recognised marriage.

Harry and Meghan initially lived at Nottingham Cottage in London, within the grounds of Kensington Palace. In May 2018, it was reported that they had signed a two-year lease on WestfieldLarge, located on the Great Tew Estate in the Cotswolds. They gave up the lease after photographs of the house and its interior were published by a paparazzi agency. The couple considered settling in the 21-room Apartment 1 at Kensington Palace, but instead moved to Frogmore Cottage in the Home Park of Windsor Castle, which Queen Elizabeth II had recently gifted to them. The Crown Estate refurbished the cottage at a cost of £2.4 million, paid from the Sovereign Grant, with Harry later reimbursing expenses beyond restoration and ordinary maintenance, part of which was offset against rental payments due at the time.

Harry and Meghan's first child, son Archie, was born on 6 May 2019. Their office was moved to Buckingham Palace and officially closed on 31 March 2020 when the Sussexes ceased "undertaking official engagements in support of the Queen". After several months in Canada and the US, the couple bought a house in June 2020 on the former estate of Riven Rock in Montecito, California. The following month, Meghan suffered a miscarriage. Their second child, daughter Lilibet, was born on 4 June 2021. In 2024, the couple reportedly acquired a property in Portugal, understood to be in the Melides area of the Alentejo coast, while retaining their home in Montecito. In August 2026, the couple relocated to the UK for an extended period and established a private residence outside London, while retaining their properties in California and Portugal.

They have owned a Labrador named Pula and two Beagles named Guy and Mamma Mia. In 2017, Harry stated that he had "five or six" godchildren, some of whom later attended his wedding.

=== Health ===
In May 1988, Harry underwent surgery for a minor hernia. In November 2000, he broke his thumb while playing football at Eton and required a minor operation. In his memoir Spare, Harry stated that he took cocaine at the age of 17. In 2002, it was reported that, with Charles's encouragement, Harry had visited a drug-rehabilitation unit to speak with recovering drug addicts after it emerged that he had been smoking cannabis and drinking at his father's Highgrove House and at a local pub in the summer of 2001. He adds in the memoir that he smoked cannabis at Eton and in the gardens of Kensington Palace, though he later told a court that "he never smoked in [his] father's house". He has also recounted taking magic mushrooms at a party at Courteney Cox's house in January 2016.

In 2017, during an appearance on Bryony Gordon's podcast Mad World, Harry said that, with the support of his brother, he had sought counselling years after his mother's death. He stated that he had struggled with aggression, experienced anxiety during royal engagements, and had been "very close to a complete breakdown on numerous occasions". He later said that he had taken up boxing as a way of managing stress and "letting out aggression". In other interviews, he said that alongside therapy he used alcohol to cope and took experimental drugs recreationally, including "psychedelics, ayahuasca, psilocybin, mushrooms." In 2023, he said that psychedelics were a fundamental part of his life. He also said that what he experienced after his mother's death "was very much" post-traumatic stress disorder (PTSD).

In his mental-health documentary, The Me You Can't See, which premiered in 2021, Harry said that he had undergone four years of therapy to address his mental-health difficulties, having been encouraged to do so by his future wife after they began dating. He added that he had suffered from "panic attacks [and] severe anxiety" in his late 20s and that the demands of official visits and functions had eventually "led to burnout". In an episode of Armchair Expert, he attributed some of his difficulties to what he described as the ineffective parenting style of previous generations and to the "genetic pain and suffering" passed down in his family, saying he believed his issues stemmed from "the pain or suffering that perhaps my father or my parents had suffered". In his 2023 memoir, Harry described himself as an agoraphobe. In 2026, he revealed that he experienced an adrenaline crash and a two-week period of depression shortly after moving to Canada with his wife and their son in late 2019.

=== Political views ===
In September 2020, Harry and his wife released a video addressing American voters, urging them to "reject hate speech, misinformation and online negativity" in the 2020 United States presidential election, a message that some commentators interpreted as an implicit endorsement of Joe Biden. Earlier that year, Harry had been the subject of a prank by the Russian comedy duo Vovan and Lexus, who posed as climate activist Greta Thunberg and her father during two phone calls on New Year's Eve and 22 January 2020. During the conversations, Harry described his decision to leave the monarchy as "not easy" and criticised Donald Trump's stance on climate change and his support for the coal industry.

In May 2021, Harry appeared on the Dax Shepard and Monica Padman podcast Armchair Expert, where he discussed freedom of speech and related laws in the US, saying, "I've got so much I want to say about the First Amendment as I sort of understand it, but it is bonkers." He added that it was "a huge subject and one which [he didn't] understand", emphasising that one could "capitalise or exploit what's not said rather than uphold what is said." His comments drew criticism from several conservative American public figures, including Ted Cruz, Dan Crenshaw, Candace Owens, Jack Posobiec, and Laura Ingraham, as well as British politician Nigel Farage.

In November 2021, during a panel at Wired's Re:Wired Conference, Harry said that he had emailed Jack Dorsey, CEO of Twitter, the day before the January 6 United States Capitol attack to "warn" of potential civil unrest, but had not received a response. Later that month, Conservative MP Johnny Mercer, who was leading efforts to waive visa fees for foreign-born UK veterans and their families, told the Commons that Harry supported the proposal and viewed it as "morally right", adding that it should not be interpreted as "a political intervention".

In June 2022, in an interview with Jessica Yellin for Vogue, Meghan described Harry's reaction to the Supreme Court of the United States's decision that abortion is not a constitutionally protected right as "guttural". Harry later criticised the ruling as a "rolling back of constitutional rights" in his address to the United Nations on Mandela Day in July 2022. Associate justice Samuel Alito, who wrote the majority opinion in the case, subsequently criticised foreign figures, including Harry, for commenting on "American law" during a public speech.

In June 2023, Harry broke with royal protocol by criticising the UK government in a witness statement submitted to a court. He argued that both the British press and the government were "at rock bottom" and that, rather than scrutinising the government, the press had got "into bed with them so they can ensure the status quo".

In February 2026, Harry said in an interview with Channel 4 that aid corridors had been shut to Gaza in the aftermath of the Gaza war. In response, Israel's deputy minister of foreign affairs, Sharren Haskel, to invite him "to speak directly with the British general serving at the CMCC center ... He will tell you clearly: the corridors are open, and thousands of trucks are entering every day." She described his comments as "deeply disappointing" given his position as a member of the British royal family. In November 2026, he delivered a keynote address at an event inside the European Parliament in Brussels, advocating for stricter regulations on social media and praising the proposed EU Kids Act. In the same month, he gave an interview to The Daily Telegraph's Ukraine: The Latest podcast, in which he discussed the Russo-Ukrainian war. He highlighted what he described as "a big separation" between the American public's support for Ukraine and the position of "a certain group, or in this case an administration", before adding "I feel like we've been at war for the last decade".

=== Drug use and US visa application ===
In March 2023, the Heritage Foundation (HF) sent a dossier on Harry's past drug use to various government entities, asking whether he had disclosed such use on his US visa application. The following month, the organisation filed a lawsuit against the US Department of Homeland Security (DHS) seeking access to his immigration records.

In March 2024, the US government was ordered to provide Harry's visa-application materials to a D.C. court, following an earlier unsuccessful freedom‑of‑information request submitted by the HF. In September 2024, the case was closed after two sealed orders and a sealed "memorandum opinion" were filed. The HF then requested that the ruling be "vacated" and that confidential correspondence between the judge and DHS be released. In February 2025, US president Donald Trump ruled out deporting Harry, telling the New York Post: "I'll leave him alone." Judge Carl Nichols ordered that redacted versions of the court documents be released by 18 March 2025. Eighty‑two pages across seven exhibits were published, heavily redacted and without the visa application itself; his immigration status was withheld, and it remained unclear whether he had disclosed his drug use on the application. Immigration officials argued that the HF could "not point to any evidence of government misconduct", while Harry's representatives said he had been "truthful" and that the documents indicated he had not received preferential treatment.

In 2025, the Heritage Foundation brought a new case against the US Department of State, requesting the release of all documents on Harry except the visa papers themselves. As of July 2026, the State Department had withheld 18 documents concerning Harry in their entirety, while 289 others remained under review. The State Department and the HF were expected to update the judge on the progress of the FOIA case on 13 October 2026.

== Public life ==
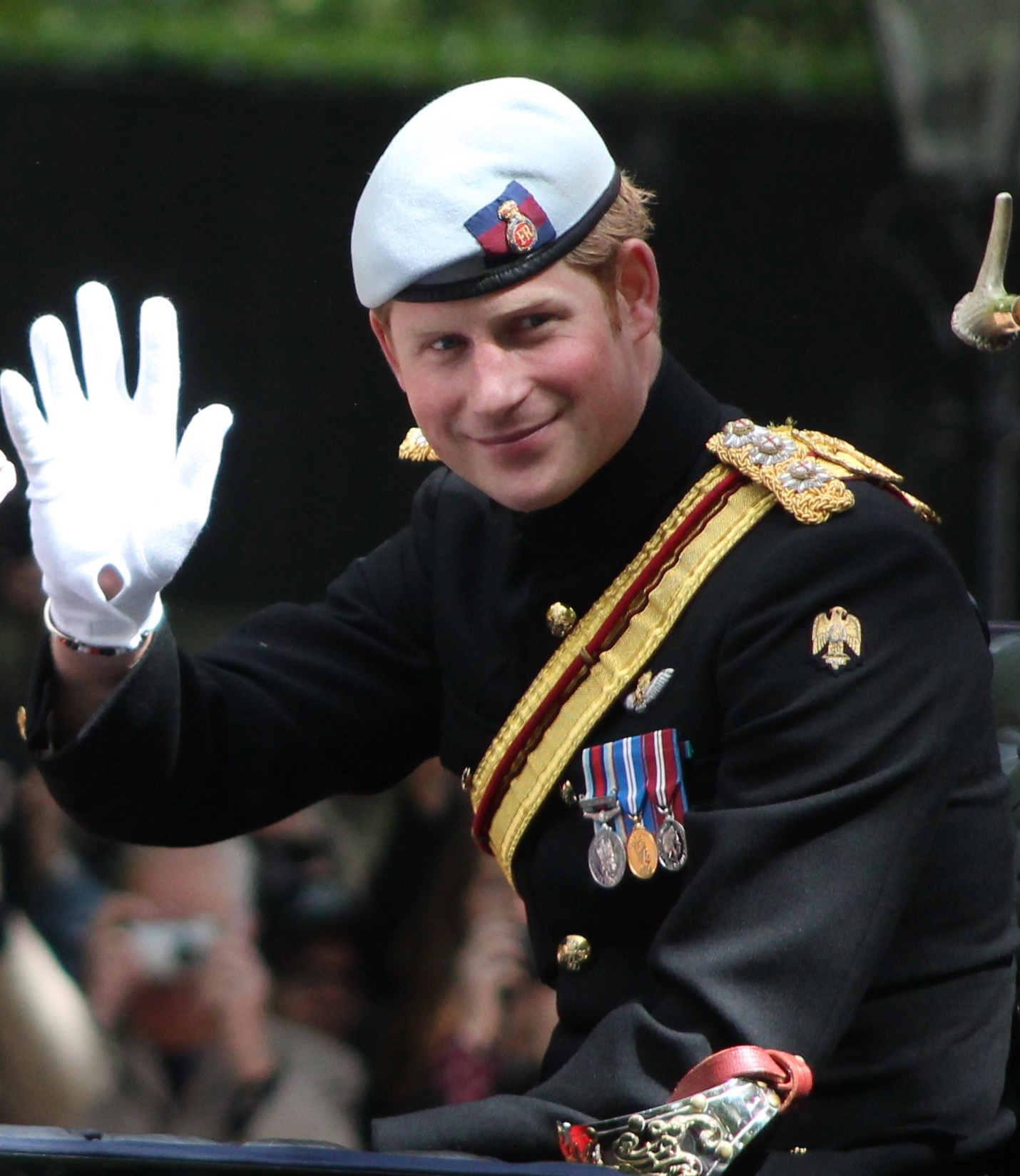
At Trooping the Colour, June 2013

At the age of 21, Harry was appointed a Counsellor of State and began his duties in that capacity. The Queen granted Harry and William their own royal household on 6 January 2009. Previously, William and Harry's affairs had been handled by their father's office at Clarence House in central London. The new household announced that they had established their own office at nearby St James's Palace to manage their public, military and charitable activities. In March 2012, Harry led an official visit to Belize as part of the Queen's Diamond Jubilee celebrations. He continued to the Bahamas and Jamaica, where the Prime Minister, Portia Simpson-Miller, was considering beginning the process of making Jamaica a republic. He then visited Brazil to attend the GREAT Campaign. Harry also played tambourine and took part in the music video for the song "Sing", which was released in May 2012 to commemorate the Diamond Jubilee.

Between 9 and 15 May 2013, he made an official visit to the US. The tour promoted the rehabilitation of injured American and UK troops, publicised his own charities and supported British interests. It included engagements in Washington, DC, Colorado, New York, New Jersey, and Connecticut. He met survivors of Hurricane Sandy in New Jersey. In October 2013, he undertook his first official tour of Australia, attending the International Fleet Review at Sydney Harbour. He also visited the Australian SAS HQ in Perth. In May 2014, he visited Estonia and Italy. In Estonia, he visited Freedom Square in Tallinn to honour fallen Estonian soldiers. He also attended a reception at the Estonian Parliament and a NATO military exercise. In Italy, Harry attended commemorations of the 70th anniversary of the Monte Cassino battles, in which Polish, Commonwealth and British troops fought. He opened the Field of Remembrance at Westminster Abbey on 6 November 2014, a task usually performed by Prince Philip.

Before reporting for duty to the Australian Defence Force (ADF), Harry visited the Australian War Memorial in Canberra on 6 April 2015. He made a farewell walkabout at the Sydney Opera House on 7 May 2015 and visited Macquarie University Hospital. He joined his father in Turkey to attend commemorations of the centenary of the Gallipoli Campaign in April 2015. In October 2015, Harry carried out a day of engagements in the US. He launched the Invictus Games Orlando 2016 with First Lady Michelle Obama and Second Lady Jill Biden at Fort Belvoir. He later attended an Invictus Games board meeting and a reception to celebrate the launch at the British Ambassador's Residence. As patron of Sentebale, Harry travelled to Lesotho to attend the opening of the Mamohato Children's Centre in November 2015. From 30 November to 3 December 2015, he made an official visit to South Africa. He visited Cape Town, where he presented the insignia of the Order of the Companions of Honour to the Archbishop on behalf of the Queen. Harry also played in the Sentebale Royal Salute Polo Cup, at Val de Vie Estate in Cape Town, raising funds for Sentebale. He visited Nepal from 19 to 23 March 2016. He stayed until the end of March 2016 to help rebuild a secondary school with Team Rubicon UK, and visited a hydropower project in Central Nepal.

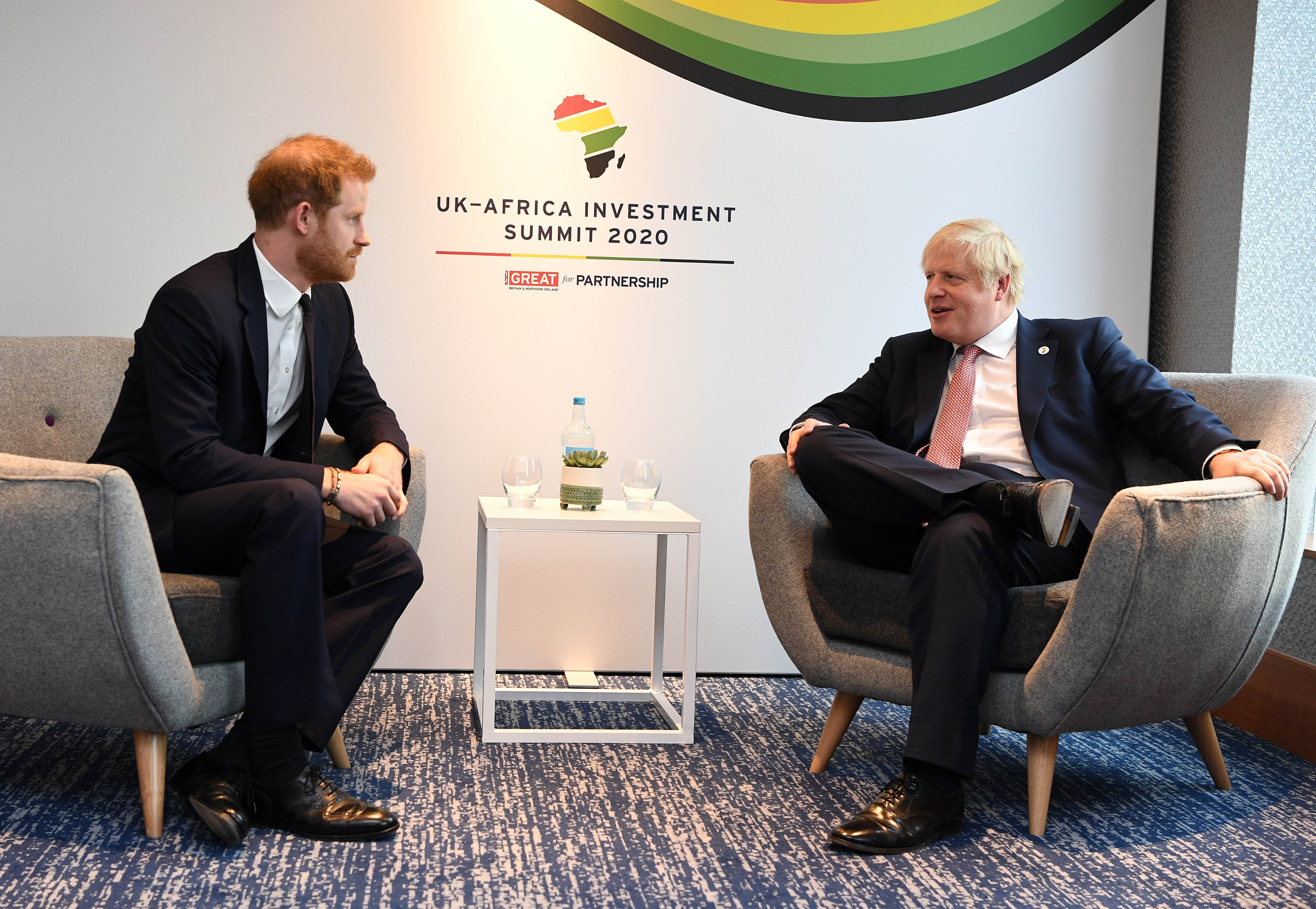
With British prime minister Boris Johnson at the 2020 UK–Africa Investment Summit

In April 2018, he was appointed Commonwealth youth ambassador, a position he held until March 2020. Also that month, Harry became a patron of Walk of America, a campaign bringing together a number veterans for a 1,000-mile expedition across the US later that year. Harry was appointed president of the Queen's Commonwealth Trust, which focuses on projects involving children and the welfare of prisoners, in April. Online QCT chat sessions were periodically held and uploaded to YouTube for public viewing. He remained the charity's president until February 2021. In July 2018, Harry travelled to Dublin, Ireland, with Meghan, marking their first overseas visit as a couple. In October 2018, they travelled to Sydney for the 2018 Invictus Games. This formed part of a Pacific tour that included Australia, Fiji, Tonga and New Zealand.

Harry identifies as a feminist. During their visit to Morocco in February 2019, he and Meghan focused on projects centred on "women's empowerment, girls' education, inclusivity and encouragement of social entrepreneurship". As part of establishing a separate office from that of William and his wife Catherine in 2019, Harry and Meghan created an Instagram account that became the fastest at the time to reach one million followers. During his trip to Angola in 2019, Harry visited the Born Free to Shine project in Luanda, an initiative by First Lady Ana Dias Lourenço aimed at preventing "HIV transmission from mothers to babies" through education, medical testing and treatment. He also met young people living with HIV during his visit. During his visit to the Luengue-Luiana National Park, Harry unveiled an initiative by the Queen's Commonwealth Canopy to protect "an ancient elephant migration route" by providing elephants with safe passage through the forest. In September and October 2019, a Southern African tour included Malawi, Angola, South Africa and Botswana. As their infant son Archie travelled with them, it was "their first official tour as a family". Harry completed 1,190 engagements between 2006 and 2019.

=== Stepping back and subsequent public appearances ===
In January 2020, Harry and Meghan announced that they were stepping back from their role as senior members of the royal family, and would divide their time between the United Kingdom and North America. A statement released by the Palace confirmed that they were to become financially independent and cease to represent the Queen. At the time of the announcement of Harry and Meghan's decision to "step back" as senior members of the royal family in 2020, 95% of the couple's income derived from the £2.3 million given to them annually by Harry's father, Charles, as part of his income from the Duchy of Cornwall. The couple retain their HRH stylings but are not permitted to use them. The formal role of Harry and Meghan was subject to a twelve-month review period, ending in March 2021. In March 2020, he attended the opening of the Silverstone Experience in Silverstone Circuit with racing driver Lewis Hamilton. Harry's appearance at the museum was his final solo engagement as a senior royal. He and Meghan attended the Commonwealth Day service at Westminster Abbey on 9 March 2020, which was their last engagement as a couple before they officially stepped down on 31 March. Harry's personal wealth was estimated at £30 million by The Daily Telegraph in 2020. In April 2021, Harry returned to the UK to attend the funeral of his grandfather, Prince Philip. Meghan did not attend due to her pregnancy. The following year, they made their first official appearance in the UK in June 2022, when they attended the Platinum Jubilee National Service of Thanksgiving.

The Sussexes visited the UK and Germany in September 2022 for a number of charity events in Manchester and Düsseldorf. On 8 September, while Harry and Meghan were in London preparing to attend a charity event, Queen Elizabeth II died at Balmoral Castle in Scotland, and they remained in the United Kingdom for her funeral. In May 2023, Harry attended the coronation of his father alone.

Harry and Meghan visited Nigeria in May 2024 to honour the work of the Invictus Games. According to CNN, their trip focused on "sports rehabilitation, mental health, and women's empowerment". In August that year, the couple visited Colombia at the invitation of the country's vice-president, Francia Márquez. The visit cost Col$244,245,305 (approximately £44,419) in public funds, covering official expenses such as internal transportation, security, and advance logistical planning, while the couple paid for their own international flights, accommodation in Bogotá, and personal expenses. Harry visited the Superhumans Center in Lviv, Ukraine, in April 2025 after an invitation from its chief executive. During the visit, he met people injured in the Russo-Ukrainian war and viewed the centre's rehabilitation work. He returned to Ukraine in September 2025 at the invitation of Superhumans, travelling to Kyiv to meet veterans and others affected by the conflict. During the visit, he spoke at an event on the transition from military service, met privately with the Minister for Veteran Affairs, and attended a fundraising gathering in support of the organisation. On 3 November 2025, Harry's office announced that he would travel to Toronto, Canada, for a series of events ahead of Remembrance Day. He and Meghan visited Jordan in February 2026 with the Director-General of the World Health Organization (WHO) Tedros Adhanom Ghebreyesus. For the trips to Colombia and Jordan, the couple was accompanied by one selected reporter.

In April 2026, Harry and Meghan undertook a four‑day visit to Australia. A petition on Change.org calling for the couple not to receive taxpayer-funded security during the trip attracted more than 45,000 signatures, prompting their team to state that the visit would be funded privately. Australian police later announced that they would conduct an operation to ensure safety during parts of the couple's tour. Later that month, Harry made another visit to Kyiv, where he used a speech at the Kyiv Security Forum to urge the US to take a stronger role in supporting Ukraine and said to Russian President Vladimir Putin that "there is still a moment – now – to stop this war." In response to the remarks, US president Donald Trump stated, "I know one thing, Prince Harry is not speaking for the UK, that's for sure". In July, Meghan and their children joined Harry on a visit to the UK as he marked one year until the 2027 Invictus Games, during which they privately met with King Charles III and Queen Camilla. In August, the family relocated to the UK for an "extended period", with Archie and Lilibet enrolled to begin school there in September. It was reported that the family would reside at a private, non-royal property, and Harry and Meghan would remain non-working members of the royal family and would not resume official royal duties. In October, the couple made their first joint appearance in the UK since their relocation, attending a series of engagements in Nottingham. In November, he made a two-day visit to Lviv, Ukraine, to support injured service members and rehabilitation programmes and to attend a conference organised by the Superhumans Center.

=== Publicly funded police security ===
Harry faced difficulties with obtaining and maintaining publicly funded security, both in Canada and the United Kingdom, after he and Meghan announced their decision to step back as senior members of the royal family. While the couple resided on Vancouver Island, the Canadian Taxpayers Federation launched a petition calling for the Royal Canadian Mounted Police to cease providing security to the Sussexes. The Government of Canada announced RCMP security would not be provided after March 2020 when the couple's status changed. A similar petition circulated in the UK in mid-March 2020. Following the petitions in Canada and the UK, President Donald Trump stated that the US would not pay for the couple's security, although they said they did not intend to request US-funded protection.

In January 2022, it was reported that Harry had been involved in a legal challenge since September 2021 over the Home Office's refusal to allow him to pay for police protection. He had made the offer to pay during the Sandringham Summit and "self-evidently believed" that it would be passed on to the government. Following the first court hearing of the case by the High Court, it was revealed that Harry had 'exceptional status' and the Royal and VIP Executive Committee (RAVEC) still determined his personal protective security on a case-by-case basis. After receiving applications by Harry and the Home Office to keep parts of the case private, the High Court ruled in March 2022 that some parts of it would remain confidential. Mr Justice Swift also reacted to Harry's legal team sending a copy of the ruling to someone who was not a lawyer, describing it as "entirely unacceptable". In July 2022, Mr Justice Swift granted permission for part of Harry's claim to proceed for a judicial review.

Harry filed a lawsuit against the Home Office and the Metropolitan Police in August 2022, challenging the decision by RAVEC from January 2022 which stated that State security could not be made available to private individuals even if they wished to pay for it themselves. In February 2023, a High Court judge ruled that the second case should be dismissed; however, the decision was later appealed by Harry's legal team. He lost the legal challenge in May 2023, meaning that he would not be allowed to make private payments for police protection. In June 2023, a Freedom of Information request revealed that Harry's legal challenge with the Home Office had cost £502,236, with £492,000 covered by the state and the remaining £10,000 covered by Harry. In February 2024, the High Court ruled against Harry in his case against the Home Office and upheld the decision by RAVEC, stating that there had been no unlawfulness in the decision-making process for his security arrangements. In April 2024, he lost an initial attempt to appeal against the ruling. Despite his lawyers' attempts to have him pay no more than 50% of the Home Office's legal costs of defending his challenge, the judge held him liable for 90% of the costs. It was also revealed that during the proceedings Harry had leaked information via email to "a partner of Schillings" and to Johnny Mercer, for which he apologised to the court. In May 2024, he was given permission by the Court of Appeal to challenge the High Court's decision. His appeal was rejected by three senior judges in May 2025 and he was likely to be held liable for the UK government's legal fees.

In December 2025, it was announced that, for the first time since April 2019, RAVEC would reassess Harry's threat level. The decision followed a private letter he had sent to Home Secretary Shabana Mahmood earlier in the year. In June 2026, ahead of a visit to the UK with his family, the government declined Harry's request for police protection outside royal residences. A risk-management assessment took place at the end of July, although Harry had yet to receive a decision on his security arrangements. In the following month, Harry's lawyers wrote again to Shabana Mahmood asking her to personally review his case and alleging that the head of RAVEC had failed to inform Harry's security team of threats against him by al-Qaeda in 2023, when he was living in the United States. The information had been shared through the Five Eyes intelligence-sharing system, but it was the FBI that passed it on to Harry's security team. Harry gave RAVEC less than two weeks' notice before moving his family back to Britain in August 2026 rather than the customary 28 days, citing concerns about leaks and a desire to inform his father first. Following the family's return, RAVEC commissioned new risk assessments for both Harry and Meghan, the first such assessment for Meghan since the couple stepped down as working royals in 2020.

== Civilian career and investments ==
In summer 2019, before announcing their decision to step back in January 2020, Harry and his wife were involved in talks with Jeffrey Katzenberg, the founder of the now-defunct streaming platform Quibi, about a possible unpaid role with the service, but ultimately decided against joining the project. In September 2019, it was reported that the couple had hired New York-based PR firm Sunshine Sachs, which had been working with them on intermittent projects since 2017. The firm represented them until 2022 and was rehired in 2026. The couple have also been associated with Adam Lilling's Plus Capital, a venture capital fund designed to connect early-stage companies with influencers and investors. Between 2019 and 2020, Harry and Meghan contributed to the book Finding Freedom through a third-party source. Despite initially denying their involvement with the book, their contributions became apparent during Meghan's court case against Associated Newspapers, which sought to use the book in its defence.

In June 2020, they signed with the Harry Walker Agency, owned by media company Endeavor, to conduct paid public speaking engagements. In September 2020, the Sussexes signed a five-year private commercial deal with Netflix. In December 2020, Harry and Meghan signed a multi-year deal with Spotify to produce and host their own programmes through their audio producing company, Archewell Audio. The couple released a holiday special on the service later that month. In June 2023, Spotify announced that it would not continue the deal, ending Archetypes after a single season of 12 episodes. Harry & Meghan, a docuseries about the Sussexes, was produced by Netflix and the couple's Archewell Productions and premiered on 8 December 2022. It was directed by Liz Garbus. The series received mixed reviews. In April 2024, it was announced that Archewell Productions was working with Netflix on two new shows, one about lifestyle and another about polo. The Polo docuseries was released in December 2024 and was a critical and commercial disappointment. In August 2025, Archewell Productions renewed its partnership with Netflix under a multi-year first-look deal, which included plans for other documentary and scripted projects.

In March 2021, San Francisco-based mental health start-up BetterUp, a company that helps people connect with coaches or counsellors, said that Harry would become its first chief impact officer. In the same month, Harry was appointed as a commissioner for the Aspen Institute's Commission on Information Disorder to carry out a six-month study on the state of misinformation and disinformation in the US. The study was published in November 2021 as a report with 15 recommendations. The following month, in his capacity as BetterUp's chief impact officer, Harry was interviewed by Fast Company and said that the recent trend of people leaving their jobs (known as the Great Resignation) was something that needed to be celebrated, though his remarks were criticised for coming from a position of privilege. In April 2022, reports emerged of criticism from the company's coaches over the new metrics used to evaluate their services and the lack of clarity surrounding Harry's actual role in the firm. In November 2026, it was announced that Harry would step down as the company's chief impact officer and become a senior advisor.

In April 2019, it was announced that Harry was working as a co-creator and executive producer of a documentary series about mental health with Oprah Winfrey, which was initially set to air in 2020 on Apple TV+. It was later announced that the series, titled The Me You Can't See, would be released on 21 May 2021. The following month, UCAS reported an increase in the percentage of students declaring mental health issues on their university applications, citing self-help books and Harry's statements about his struggles with "panic attacks and anxiety" as contributing factors. In October 2021, Harry and Meghan announced their partnership with Ethic, a sustainable investment firm based in New York City, which also manages the couple's investments. According to state filings from Delaware, where the couple's Archewell foundation is registered, Harry and Meghan incorporated 11 companies and a trust beginning in early 2020, including Orinoco Publishing LLC and Peca Publishing LLC to hold the rights to their books as well as Cobblestone Lane LLC and IPHW LLC which hold their foundation's logos.

In July 2021, it was announced that Harry was set to publish his memoir Spare through Penguin Random House, with Harry reportedly earning an advance of at least $20 million. Spare was ghostwritten by novelist J. R. Moehringer. The memoir was reportedly the first of a four-book publishing deal set to include a second book by Harry and a wellness guide by Meghan. Spare was published on 10 January 2023 in 16 languages, and became the UK's fastest-selling non-fiction book with 400,000 confirmed sales in all formats on publication day. Harry announced that $1.5 million of the proceeds from the memoir would be donated to the charity Sentebale, while £300,000 would be given to WellChild. In October 2026, Harry released a subscription-based, 90-minute online session on MasterClass titled "Redefining Grief: Building Resilience Through Loss", co-hosted with psychologist Mary-Frances O'Connor.

== Charity work ==
=== Humanitarian and environmental activities ===
Harry has granted his patronage to organisations including WellChild, Dolen Cymru, MapAction and the London Marathon Charitable Trust; he stepped down from MapAction in 2019 and the London Marathon Charitable Trust in 2021. In 2007 he and William organised the Concert for Diana, in memory of their mother, which benefited the charities and patronages of Diana, William, and Harry. In October 2008, Harry and his brother embarked on an eight-day, 1,000-mile Enduro Africa motorbike ride across South Africa to raise money for Sentebale, UNICEF and the Nelson Mandela Children's Fund. In September 2009, William and Harry set up The Foundation of Prince William and Prince Harry to enable them to take forward their charitable ambitions. Harry left the charity in June 2019.

After taking part in an incomplete expedition to the North Pole with Walking With The Wounded in 2011, Harry joined the charity's 200-mile expedition to the South Pole in Antarctica during December 2013, accompanying twelve injured servicemen and women from the UK, the US and the Commonwealth. In August 2014, Harry took part in a flight in a vintage Supermarine Spitfire fighter aircraft, with Phil O'Dell acting as the pilot instructor and flight commander. The flight took place over the Isle of Wight coastline to promote the Spitfire Scholarship, a charitable initiative launched by Harry that mirrored World War II pilot training to teach wounded, injured, and sick service veterans how to fly. As patron of Walk of Britain, he walked with the team on 30 September and 20 October 2015. To raise awareness of HIV testing, Harry took a test live on the royal family Facebook page on 14 July 2016. He later attended the 21st International AIDS Conference in Durban, South Africa, on 21 July 2016. On World AIDS Day, Harry and Rihanna helped publicise HIV testing by taking the test themselves. Since 2016, Harry has worked with Terrence Higgins Trust to raise awareness of HIV and sexual health. In November 2019, to mark the National HIV Testing Week, Harry interviewed Rugby player Gareth Thomas, who is living with HIV, on behalf of the trust.

In December 2017, Harry guest edited BBC Radio 4's Today programme, conducting interviews with his father, then Prince of Wales, former US president Barack Obama, and others on issues such as youth violence, the Armed Forces, mental health, the Commonwealth, conservation and the environment. Harry was officially appointed the new president of African Parks (a conservation NGO) on 27 December 2017, a position he held until 2023, when he was appointed a member of its board of directors. Harry had previously spent three weeks in Malawi with African Parks where he joined a team of volunteers and professionals to carry out one of the largest elephant translocations in history. The effort to repopulate areas affected by poaching and habitat loss moved 500 elephants from Liwonde and Majete National Parks to Nkhotakota Wildlife Reserve. Harry had previously helped relocate rhinos in the Okavango Delta and later became patron of the Rhino Conservation Botswana. Accusations of abuse by the charity were reported in 2022 and 2024, when reports claimed that rangers managed by African Parks had been torturing, beating, raping, and forcibly displacing members of the indigenous Baka community. Following a ten-year association with the organisation, he is due to conclude his tenure on the board on 30 September 2026.

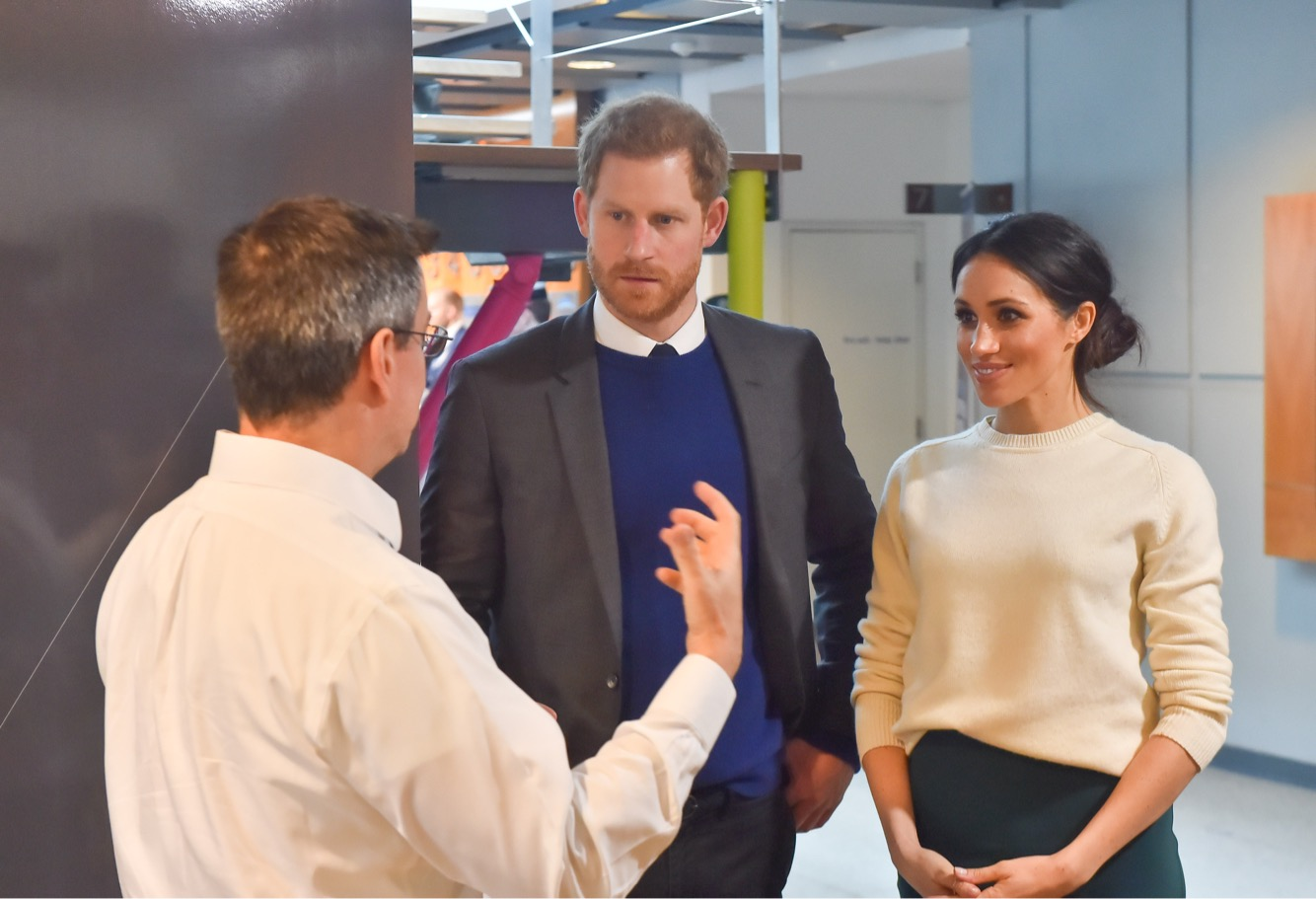
With Meghan visiting Catalyst Inc, 2018

In July 2018, the Elton John AIDS Foundation announced that Harry and British singer Elton John would launch a global coalition called MenStar that would focus "on treating HIV infections in men". In May 2019, Harry and Meghan together with his brother and sister-in-law launched Shout, the UK's first 24/7 text messaging service for those experiencing mental health difficulties. In September 2019, Harry launched Travalyst during his visit to the Netherlands after two years of development. The initiative aims "to encourage sustainable practices in the travel industry" and "tackle climate change and environmental damage", in collaboration with a number of companies, including Tripadvisor, Booking.com, Ctrip, Skyscanner, and Visa Inc. The organisation later announced a partnership with Google in 2021. In October 2019, along with other members of the royal family, Harry voiced a Public Health England announcement, for the "Every Mind Matters" mental health programme.

In February 2020, Harry recorded a new version of the song "Unbroken" with Jon Bon Jovi. The new version featured backing vocals from members of the Invictus Choir. The song was released on 27 March 2020, with the proceeds donated to the Invictus Games Foundation. In April 2020, Harry launched a new initiative named HeadFIT, a platform designed to provide mental health support for members of the armed forces. The initiative was developed jointly by the Royal Foundation's Heads Together campaign, the Ministry of Defence, and King's College London. In June 2020, Harry and Meghan backed the Stop Hate for Profit campaign and encouraged CEOs of different companies to join the movement.

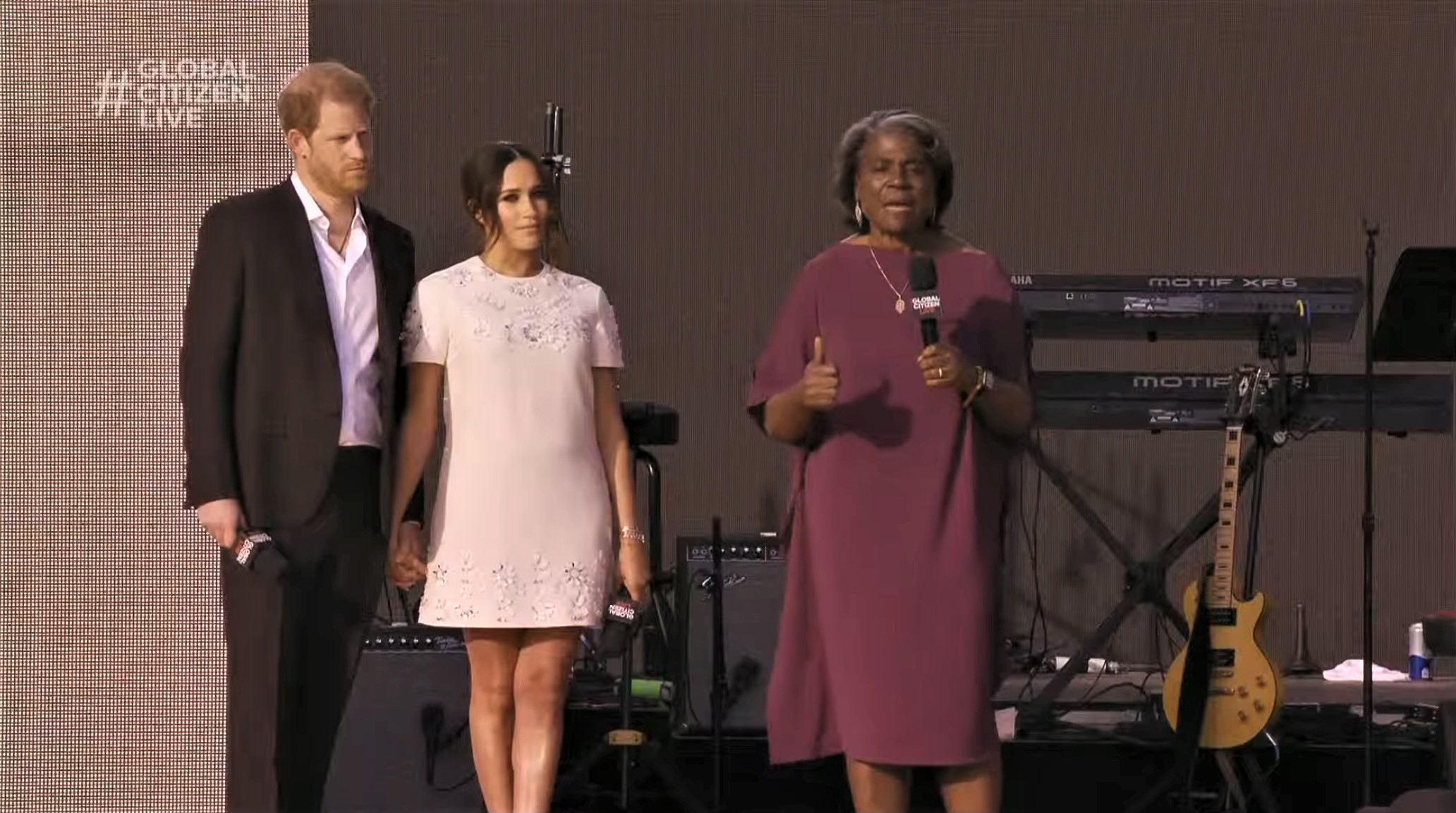
With Meghan and the US ambassador to the UN Linda Thomas-Greenfield at the 2021 Global Citizen live event

In April 2021, Harry and Meghan were announced as campaign chairs for Vax Live: The Concert to Reunite the World, an event organised by Global Citizen to increase access to COVID-19 vaccinations. They also announced their support for a vaccine equity fundraiser initiated by the same organisation, and wrote an open letter to pharmaceutical industry CEOs, urging them to address the vaccine equity crisis. Later that month, he narrated "Hope Starts Here", a special video rereleased by African Parks to mark Earth Day, in which he urged organisations and communities to preserve biodiversity and paid tribute to his grandfather Prince Philip for his efforts as a conservationist. He helped establish Peak State, a mental fitness programme aimed at providing tools and resources for managing mental health, to which he publicly lent his support in May 2021.

Like his mother, Harry has worked with the HALO Trust, an organisation that removes debris – particularly landmines – left behind by war. He had previously visited a minefield in Mozambique with the charity and spent two days learning about their work and mine-clearing techniques. In 2013, he was named patron of the charity's 25th Anniversary Appeal. In April 2017, he hosted the Landmine Free 2025 reception at Kensington Palace, during which the UK government announced an increase in its financial support for de-mining efforts. In September 2019, he walked through a de-mining site in Angola, the same country visited by his mother 22 years earlier. In June 2021, after ten members of the trust were killed by an armed group at a mine clearance camp in Afghanistan, Harry issued a statement saying the attack "was nothing less than an act of barbarism".

In September 2021, together with First Lady Jill Biden, he hosted a virtual event for the Warrior Games, which were cancelled due to the COVID-19 pandemic. In October 2021, he spoke against oil drilling in the Okavango River in an op-ed for The Washington Post. Later that month, ahead of the 2021 G20 Rome summit, Harry and his wife wrote an open letter with the Director-General of the World Health Organization, Tedros Adhanom Ghebreyesus, asking the G20 leaders to expedite efforts towards the global distribution of COVID-19 vaccines. In March 2022, they were among more than a hundred people who signed an open letter published by the People's Vaccine Alliance, asking for free global access to COVID-19 vaccines and criticising the UK, EU and Switzerland for opposing a waiver that would allow vaccine intellectual property protections to be lifted. In April 2022 and in a video featuring Rhys Darby and Dave Fane on Māori Television, Harry launched an eco-travel campaign through his non-profit Travalyst, encouraging people to travel sustainably. In November 2023, he was named global ambassador for Scotty's Little Soldiers, one of the seven charities that he and Meghan had invited people to support in lieu of giving them wedding presents.

In September 2025, Harry announced that he had donated £1.1 million to BBC Children in Need in December 2024, describing it as a "significant investment" in grassroots organisations in Nottingham supporting young people affected by violence. The money was reportedly drawn from the Glen Beg Foundation, a charitable entity holding funds inherited from his mother. The following month, he and Meghan joined a coalition of public figures, scientists, and tech experts in signing an open letter calling for a global ban on the development of artificial superintelligence until there is strong scientific consensus and public support ensuring it can be created safely and ethically, emphasising the existential risks that unchecked AI could pose to humanity. In September 2026, Harry completed a charity skydive in Ontario with the grandson of World War II veteran Ed Marshall, fulfilling a promise to Marshall and raising funds for Sunnybrook and the True Patriot Love Foundation.

=== Sport ===
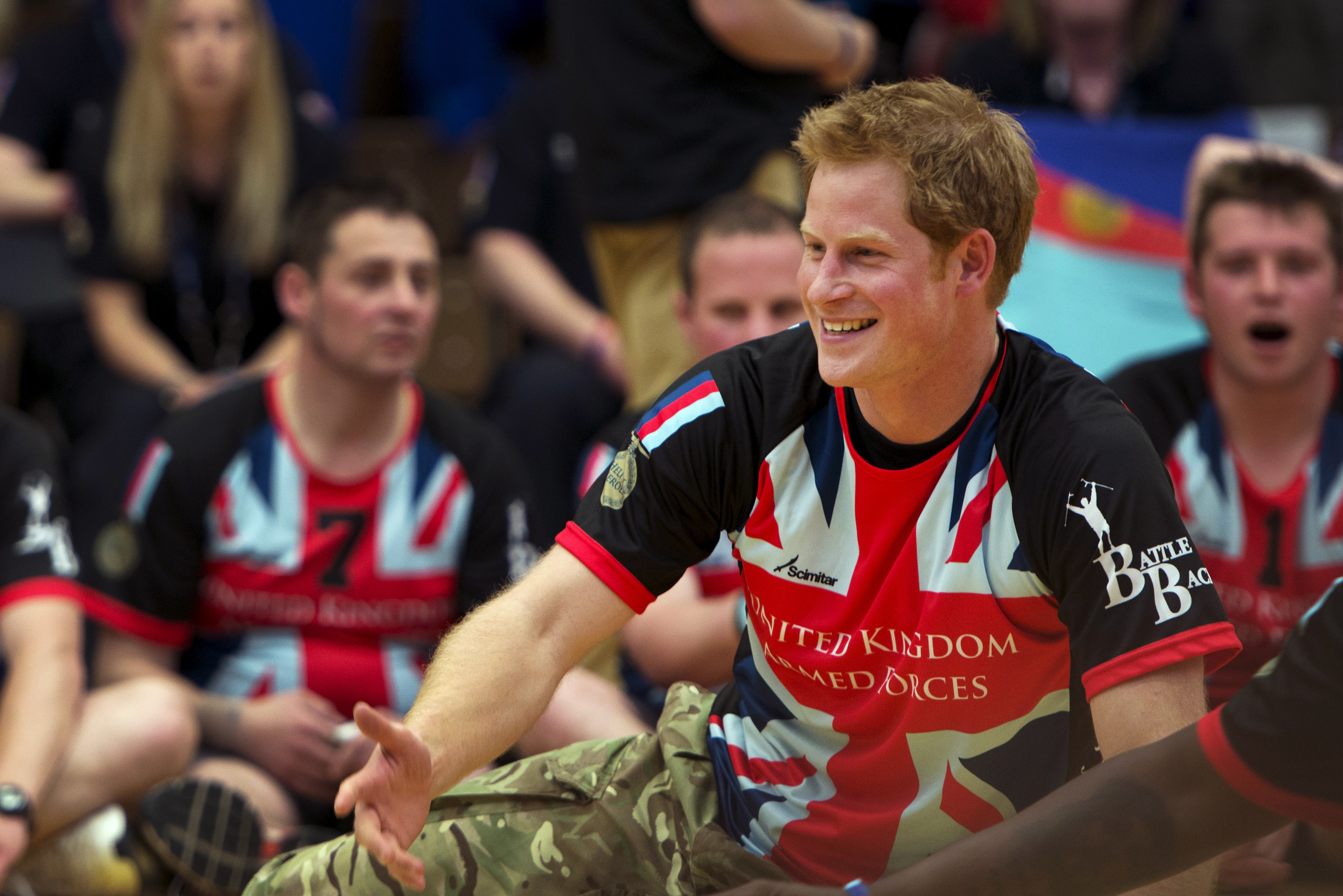
Harry competing in an exhibition sitting volleyball match between the UK and the US teams during the Warrior Games, 2013

Harry has enjoyed playing sports, such as competitive polo, skiing, and motocross. Like his brother and father, he has participated in polo matches to raise money for charitable causes. Harry is also a keen rugby football fan and supported England's bid to host rugby union's 2015 Rugby World Cup, and presented the trophy at rugby league's 2019 Challenge Cup finals. In 2004 Harry trained as a Rugby Development Officer for the Rugby Football Union and coached students in schools to encourage them to learn the sport. He and former rugby player Brian Moore argued that, in response to Black Lives Matter, the song "Swing Low, Sweet Chariot" should no longer be sung in a rugby context. He served as vice-patron of the Rugby Football Union (RFU) from 2010 to 2016, and as patron of both the RFU and the Rugby Football League (RFL), the governing body of rugby league in England, from December 2016 to February 2021. He had served as the RFU's vice-royal patron since 2010, supporting the Queen as patron. In October 2026, he attended a Prem Rugby fixture between Gloucester Rugby and Leicester Tigers at the Kingsholm Stadium.

In 2012, Harry launched Coach Core alongside William and Catherine. The programme was set up following the 2012 Olympics and provides apprenticeship opportunities for people seeking to pursue a career as a professional coach. In January 2017, Harry visited the Running Charity and its partner Depaul UK to highlight the role of sport in helping homeless and vulnerable people. In June 2019, Harry attended the launch of Made by Sport, a charity coalition established to raise money to support sport in disadvantaged communities. In his statement, he supported the charity, arguing that its role in bringing sport into the life of disadvantaged people would save "hundreds of millions of pounds" in addressing issues affecting young people.

=== Sussex Royal and Archewell ===
In June 2019, it was announced that Harry and Meghan would split from The Royal Foundation and establish their own charitable foundation by the end of 2019. The couple would continue to collaborate with William and Catherine on mutual projects, such as the mental health initiative Heads Together. In July 2019, Harry and Meghan's new charity was registered in England and Wales under the title "Sussex Royal The Foundation of The Duke and Duchess of Sussex". It was confirmed on 21 February 2020 that "Sussex Royal" would not be used as a brand name for the couple following their withdrawal from public life. Sussex Royal Foundation was renamed "MWX Foundation" on 5 August 2020 and dissolved the same day.

In March 2021, it was reported that the Charity Commission for England and Wales was conducting a review of the Sussex Royal organisation in a "regulatory and compliance case" regarding its conduct under charity law during dissolution. Representatives for the couple claimed that Sussex Royal was "managed by a board of trustees" and that "suggestion of mismanagement" directed exclusively at Harry and Meghan would be incorrect. The commission later concluded that the foundation had not acted unlawfully, but criticised the board of directors for expending a "substantial proportion of funds" on setting up and closing the charity.

In April 2020, Harry and Meghan confirmed that their new foundation, replacing Sussex Royal, would be called "Archewell". The name stems from the Greek word "arche", which means "source of action", and also inspired the name of their son. Archewell was registered in the US. Its website launched in October 2020.

=== Sentebale ===
In 2006 Harry visited Mants'ase Children's Home near Mohale's Hoek in Lesotho, which he had first toured in 2004, and alongside Prince Seeiso of Lesotho, launched Sentebale: The Princes' Fund for Lesotho, a charity to assist children orphaned by HIV/AIDS. In March 2025, Harry and Prince Seeiso of Lesotho resigned from their roles as patrons of Sentebale following a dispute between the charity's trustees and the chair of the board, Sophie Chandauka. Chandauka reported the charity to the Charity Commission due to what she described as "poor governance, weak executive management, abuse of power, bullying, harassment, misogyny, misogynoir – and the coverup that ensued". Chandauka later accused Harry of "harassment and bullying at scale" by authorising "the release of a damaging piece of news to the outside world", adding that his "toxic" brand was "the number one risk" for the organisation. There were also allegations that through his contacts Harry had asked Chandauka to issue a statement in support of his wife following an awkward interaction between the two women during a polo match in Miami, and had later demanded that she "explain herself" in a note that was described as "unpleasant" in tone and reportedly used "imperious" language. In August 2025 the Charity Commission announced that it had found no evidence of "widespread or systemic bullying or harassment, including misogyny or misogynoir" or "over-reach" by either Chandauka or Harry but acknowledged a "strong perception of ill treatment felt by a number of parties" and stated that deciding on specific allegations of bullying was outside its regulatory remit. It also criticised all sides for allowing the conflict "to play out publicly" and cited poor internal governance and a "failure to resolve disputes internally" as factors that affected the charity's reputation.

In March 2026, Sentebale filed a defamation claim against Harry and former trustee Mark Dyer, with documents lodged in the High Court in London alleging that they had conducted an "adverse media campaign" against the charity since March 2025. In October 2026, it was reported that Sentebale had paused its defamation claim against Harry amid financial strain and concerns that legal costs could threaten the charity's continued operation.

== Public image ==
In his youth, Harry earned a reputation for being rebellious, leading the tabloid press to label him a "wild child". At the age of 17, he was seen smoking cannabis, drinking underage with friends, and clashing physically with paparazzi outside nightclubs. In early 2005, he was photographed at a "Colonial and Native"-themed birthday party in Wiltshire wearing a Nazi German Afrika Korps uniform with a swastika armband. His choice drew criticism from the media, politicians, and religious figures. Clarence House later issued a public statement in which Harry apologised for his behaviour. In an interview for his 21st birthday, he stated that it "was a very stupid thing to do and I've learnt my lesson".

In January 2005, in response to an inquiry about his Zimbabwean girlfriend Chelsy Davy, Harry responded "She's not black or anything, you know". In January 2009, the British tabloid, the News of the World published a video made by Harry three years earlier in which he referred to a Pakistani fellow officer cadet as "our little Paki friend" and called a soldier wearing a camouflage hood a "raghead". These terms were described by the Leader of the Opposition at the time David Cameron as "unacceptable", and by The Daily Telegraph as "racist". A British Muslim youth organisation called Harry a "thug". Further extracts showed him telling a comrade "I love you" before giving him a kiss on the cheek and licking his face, and asking another whether he felt gay, queer, or on the side. Clarence House immediately issued an apology from Harry, who stated that no malice was intended in his remarks. Subsequently, it was reported that the military had instructed Harry to attend a diversity course. In the same year, British stand-up comedian Stephen K. Amos alleged that after a stand-up show for Charles's 60th birthday celebrations in November 2008 Harry had commented on his performance by saying, "You don't sound like a black chap", though he hoped that the remarks were made in jest.

In October 2007, a video from Harry's trip to Namibia with his friends was published, showing him snorting vodka and licking a male friend's nipples. While on holiday in Las Vegas in August 2012, Harry and an unknown young woman were photographed naked in a Wynn Las Vegas hotel room, reportedly during a game of strip billiards. The pictures were leaked by American celebrity website TMZ on 21 August 2012, and reported worldwide by mainstream media on 22 August 2012. The photographs were shown by the American media, but British media were reluctant to publish them. Royal aides suggested Clarence House would contact the Press Complaints Commission (PCC) if British publications used the pictures. St James's Palace confirmed that Harry was in the photographs, saying that he was essentially a victim whose privacy had been invaded and contacted the PCC upon hearing that a number of British newspapers were considering publishing the photographs. On 24 August 2012, The Sun newspaper published the photographs. At a 2014 event in England, Foo Fighters drummer Taylor Hawkins was slapped by Harry after he had told him "I can't wake up, so tired", with Harry subsequently stating "You awake now?" Hawkins added "I got slapped in the face by the prince. That's OK really, if you think about it. But in the moment, I was like, 'You fucking slapped me, dude.'"

In December 2021, reports emerged about Harry's meetings with Saudi businessman Mahfouz Marei Mubarak bin Mahfouz, whose receipt of a CBE became the subject of an investigation by the Scottish Charity Regulator. Mahfouz had met Harry in 2013 and 2014 and donated £50,000 to his charity Sentebale and £10,000 to Walking With The Wounded, of which Harry is patron. The Sunday Times claimed that the meetings with Harry opened the way for Mahfouz to get access to the Prince of Wales. Harry referred to the incident as the "CBE scandal" in December 2021 and stated that he severed ties with Mahfouz in 2015 after expressing "growing concerns" about his motives, though aides from his father's household denied having any discussions with him regarding Mahfouz. A spokesperson for Sentebale defended the meetings and added that there was no impropriety regarding the donations.

In March 2024, Harry was named in a lawsuit against P. Diddy who was facing allegations of sexual trafficking. He was mentioned as a well-known celebrity associate of Combs, whom he would use among other famous figures to draw guests to his parties. In July 2026, The Sunday Times journalist Camilla Long accused Harry and his team of using "bully boy tactics" against the press. She alleged that on the first day of his trial against the Daily Mail, his PR representative approached her to express disapproval over one of her previous articles, which she viewed as an attempt to intimidate journalists.

=== Public opinion ===
In view of their environmental activism, Harry and Meghan were criticised in August 2019 for reportedly taking four private jet journeys in 11 days, including one to Elton John's home in Nice, France. The criticism was in line with the reactions the royal family faced in June 2019, after it was revealed that they "had doubled [their] carbon footprint from business travel". Harry was criticised in August 2021 and 2022 for taking a two-hour flight on private jets between California and Aspen, Colorado, to participate in an annual charity polo tournament. In June 2022, on their way to California after the Queen's Platinum Jubilee, Harry and Meghan boarded a private jet that was estimated to have emitted "ten times more carbon than flying commercial".

After his marriage, Harry's popularity increased above that of other royals, as he was deemed likeable by 77 per cent of respondents in a poll of 3,600 Britons conducted by statistics and polling company YouGov. However, his popularity declined after stepping back from royal duties, and fell further after the release of his controversial interview with Oprah Winfrey, his Netflix docuseries, and his memoir. In December 2022, Harry was found to be the third most disliked member of the British royal family by YouGov, preceded by his uncle Prince Andrew and his wife Meghan. Writing for The New York Times, Sarah Lyall noted that following the release of his memoir Harry and his wife lost support within segments of the American public and press. It has been suggested by critics that this fall from public esteem is due to Harry and Meghan's frequent attempts to remain relevant, and their perceived hypocrisy and selfishness. Harry and Meghan's exit from the royal family was satirised in a 2023 episode of South Park.

In 2018 and 2021, Harry was selected as one of the 100 Most Influential People in the World by Time magazine. In 2019, the magazine named Harry and his wife among the 25 Most Influential People on the Internet. In 2021, the couple were featured on one of the magazine's seven worldwide Time 100 covers. In 2024, Harry's role as founder of Travalyst was recognised in the second edition of the Time 100 Climate list which ranked the most influential climate action leaders. In 2026, he was named in the Time 100 list of most influential people in sports for his role as patron of the Invictus Games.

In 2023, People named him one of the "25 Most Intriguing People of the Year". In the same year, James Hibberd of The Hollywood Reporter named Harry and Meghan among the Hollywood losers of 2023. Following Harry and Meghan's trip to Nigeria in May 2024, Lucia Stein of the ABC argued that the couple could have been used by the royal family, and added that "perhaps how helpful they would have been" had an agreement on a "hybrid working model" been achieved. Media editor Tina Brown commented in relation to the visit that they are "enormously appealing to the public, and very good at [public engagement]." In January 2025, Harry and Meghan's appearance at a food bank during the Southern California wildfires in the Pacific Palisades drew mixed reactions from segments of the media and public figures, who labelled it "disaster tourism".

== Privacy and the media ==
=== Legal issues and incidents ===
==== Associated Newspapers ====
In January 2020, the Independent Press Standards Organisation (IPSO) ruled in favour of the Mail on Sunday in a dispute between Harry and the newspaper regarding an Instagram photo involving him in which, according to the newspaper, elephants were in fact "tranquilised" and "tethered" during a relocation. The IPSO rejected Harry's claim that the paper's description was "inaccurate" or "misleading".

In December 2020, Harry's legal team sued Associated Newspapers Limited (ANL) for a Mail on Sunday article alleging that his working relationship with the Royal Marines had deteriorated after he stepped back from royal duties. The newspaper subsequently accepted the claims were false and issued an apology. The prince's lawyer said the "substantial damages" paid by the publisher would be donated to the Invictus Games Foundation.

In February 2022, Harry filed a libel suit in the High Court against ANL for a Mail on Sunday alleging that he had sought to keep his legal challenge against the Home Office over police protection secret by requesting a confidentiality order, and that he had offered to pay for police protection only after filing a lawsuit against the government. In June 2022, Mr Justice Nicklin ruled that parts of the article were potentially defamatory, though he rejected claims by Harry's lawyers that the article portrayed him as a liar. Harry attempted to have the publisher's defence dismissed, but the judge rejected his application in December 2023 and decided that the case should proceed to trial. He later ordered Harry to pay the Mail on Sunday £48,447 in legal costs. Harry withdrew the libel claim in January 2024 and became liable for the publisher's £250,000 legal costs.

In October 2022, Harry joined Doreen Lawrence, Sir Elton John, David Furnish, Sadie Frost, Elizabeth Hurley, and Sir Simon Hughes in launching legal action against ANL for their alleged "abhorrent criminal activity", which was said to involve listening to and recording people's phone calls and daily activities, obtaining sensitive information and medical records, and accessing bank accounts and financial transactions. In a statement, ANL described the allegations as "preposterous smears", and Gavin Burrows, the private investigator whose alleged 2021 statement was used as a key element in the case, said that the statement was not signed by him and was "a cut and paste from my evidence" concerning other publishers targeting individuals. In November 2023, Mr Justice Nicklin ruled that the case brought by Harry and the other claimants could proceed, but that unpublished material provided to the Leveson Inquiry was inadmissible as evidence in the case.

The case went to trial in January 2026. Ahead of the trial, ANL accused the claimants' legal team of dishonesty, fraud and conspiracy, alleging a "camouflage scheme" to disguise when claimants became aware of potential claims; the judge ordered parts of the submissions to be amended. Harry's claims related to 14 articles published between 2001 and 2013, which his lawyer argued could not have been lawfully sourced. During the trial, it was revealed that between 2011 and 2012 Harry had a close relationship with Charlotte Griffiths, a Mail on Sunday reporter, with whom he exchanged messages via Facebook and phone, and who later said that at a December 2011 party he "brazenly" placed a pill, which she believed may have been paracetamol, on her tongue before saying, "Now I know I can trust you!" In July 2026, Harry and the other claimants lost their case against ANL, with the High Court dismissing all the claims and leaving the claimants responsible for legal costs estimated to be as high as £50 million. Harry, in a joint statement with Lawrence, described the ruling as "a complete and obvious whitewash". The Inforrm blog, published by Hugh Tomlinson, the chair of Hacked Off, described their statement as "unusually strong", while Alex Chalk, Sir Robert Buckland, and Lord Garnier criticised Harry for his remarks. Following his statement, The Times newspaper called for legislation to remove him as a Counsellor of State. The following month, the judge ruled that Harry and the six other claimants should make an interim payment of £9.54 million towards ANL's costs by 28 August. ANL's total costs were £34.5 million, and the judge ordered that they be assessed on an indemnity basis. In November, Harry and five of the other claimants sought permission from the Court of Appeal to challenge the dismissal of their claims and the indemnity costs order.

==== News Group and Mirror Group newspapers ====
In October 2019, it was announced that Harry had sued the Daily Mirror, The Sun and the now-defunct News of the World "in relation to alleged phone-hacking". Former News of the World royal editor Clive Goodman had previously stated that he had hacked Harry's phone on nine occasions. Andy Coulson, the editor of the News of the World, apologised to Harry and his brother for invading their privacy, accepting "ultimate responsibility" for the actions of Goodman. In his lawsuit, Harry sought damages of more than £200,000 from the publisher of the News of the World and The Sun and alleged an earlier agreement between News Group Newspapers (NGN) and the royal family, under which he and William would not take legal action in return for an apology, had not been honoured. Both brothers brought a claim privately through their lawyers, but Harry decided to pursue his case separately with a new solicitor in 2019. In July 2023, the judge ruled that part of Harry's case involving allegations of illegal information gathering would go to trial but his phone-hacking claims were dismissed because they had been brought too late. In May 2024, Mr Justice Fancourt refused Harry permission to include claims against Rupert Murdoch, extend the scope of his case to 1994 and 1995 to cover allegations involving his mother, or add new allegations from 2016 involving his then-girlfriend Meghan. In October 2024, the judge announced that the two sides should either settle or go to trial in January 2025 and refused to let Harry's team include allegations that listening devices were placed in rooms and cars and trackers on vehicles as "no particulars whatsoever of such allegations" were provided. In January 2025, the two parties settled with NGN paying more than £10 million in payments and legal fees in the settlements involving both Harry and former Labour deputy leader Tom Watson. NGN made a "full and unequivocal apology" for "serious intrusion" by The Sun between 1996 and 2011, for "phone hacking, surveillance and misuse of private information by journalists and private investigators instructed by them at the News of the World" and for the intrusion into the life of his mother, and admitted "incidents of unlawful activity" were carried out by private investigators working for the newspaper, but "not by journalists". The BBC reported on the "scrapped case", highlighting NGN's statement which said that the settlement agreement "drew a line under the past" and that they rejected the claims that would have been made in court about a corporate cover-up.

Lawyers for the Mirror denied accessing Harry's voicemail messages and denied the other allegations, but admitted to instructing "private investigators to unlawfully obtain private information" about Harry on a single occasion involving a vist to Chinawhite. In January 2023, a High Court judge ruled that Harry's lawsuit against Mirror Group Newspapers (MGN), along with similar lawsuits against the publisher, would go to trial in May 2023. At the beginning of the trial, MGN apologised for one instance of unlawful information gathering against Harry and added that his legal challenge "warrants compensation". In June 2023, Harry testified in the court case, accusing former Daily Mirror editor Piers Morgan of horrific personal attacks and alleging that his phone had been hacked while he was still at Eton. His appearance marked the first time a member of the royal family had been cross-examined in court since Albert Edward, Prince of Wales, appeared as a witness in court in 1891. In December 2023, the High Court ruled in favour of Harry for 15 of the 33 sample stories used in his claims of phone hacking against MGN and awarded him £140,600 of the £440,000 he sought in damages. Mr Justice Fancourt concluded that Piers Morgan and other editors knew about the phone hacking at their publications and were involved in it. Harry through his lawyer David Sherborne called the ruling "vindicating and affirming" and urged the authorities to further investigate and prosecute the company. An additional 115 articles from Harry's claim could have formed the basis of two further trials, but in February 2024 he settled his claim with MGN. The publisher agreed to cover Harry's legal costs and pay damages reported to be in the region of £300,000.

==== Other cases ====
In October 2013, Jo Brand appeared on Have I Got News for You and while talking about Prince George's christening she said: "George's godparents include Hugh van Cutsem ... I presume that's a nickname as in Hugh van cuts 'em and Harry then snorts 'em." Representatives of Kensington Palace contacted the BBC after the programme aired, pointing out the error and the implications of the joke. The BBC wrote to Kensington Palace apologising for the "factual inaccuracy" as George's godfather was William van Cutsem, but it did not apologise for the comment itself as it was part of the show's "irreverent humour".

In February 2014, Ashraf Islam was sentenced to three years in prison after plotting to murder Harry and giving the plan "considerable thought" due to his belief that Harry had "a moral guilt" because he was in the army. In June 2019, two members of the neo-Nazi group Sonnenkrieg Division were jailed for eighteen months and four years, respectively, for sharing propaganda posters, including one that labelled Harry as a "race traitor" with a gun pointed at his head. The pair had called for the execution of Harry and his son.

In May 2019, Splash News issued a formal apology to the Harry and Meghan for sending photographers to their Cotswolds residence, which they said had put their privacy at risk. The agency also agreed to pay damages and legal costs associated with the case. In December 2019, PA Media withdrew a Christmas card photograph of Harry, Meghan, and their son Archie. The agency said it had done so after being advised that the photograph was "not representative of the Christmas card sent by the Duke and Duchess of Sussex". In January 2020, lawyers issued a legal warning to the press after paparazzi photographs were published in the media. In March 2020, the couple took Splash UK to court after the Duchess and their son were photographed without permission during a "private family outing" while staying in Canada. The case was settled later that year with Splash UK agreeing not to take further unauthorised photographs of the family. In April 2020, Harry and Meghan announced that they would no longer cooperate with the Daily Mail, the Sun, the Mirror and the Express. In October that year, the American news agency X17 apologised to the couple for taking photographs of their son at their home using drones.

In June 2020, it was reported that Harry's lawyers had issued a "letter before action", threatening to sue the Sun and Dan Wootton over allegations that they had paid associates of palace officials for information used in stories. It was alleged that the Sun had made two payments amounting to £4,000 to the partner of a royal official in relation to stories published in June and July 2019 about the nannying and godparenting arrangements for Archie. News Group Newspapers, publisher of the Sun, said that it had done nothing "unlawful" in sourcing the stories and that no illegal payments were made. Wootton's lawyers denied that any payments were made unlawfully to a public official or a proxy and described the claims as "a smear campaign by unknown bad actors." Wootton has been credited with breaking the story about Megxit and Harry and Meghan's initial plans for moving to Canada in the Sun on 8 January 2020, which prompted the couple to issue an announcement within hours confirming their plans to step back from royal duties. Sources close to the couple later told The New York Times that they "felt forced to disclose their plans prematurely" after learning of the Sun's intention to publish the story. Wootton disputed the claim, saying: "They released the statement after we had published the story and had so much notice."

A September 2020 article by The Times claiming that an Invictus Games fundraiser had been cancelled due to its affiliation with a competitor of Netflix, Harry's business partner, became the subject of a legal complaint by him. In January 2022, the couple filed a legal complaint against The Times over an article reporting that Archewell had raised less than $50,000 in 2020.

A few days after the palace congratulated Harry and Meghan on the birth of their daughter Lilibet in June 2021, the BBC reported that they had not sought the Queen's permission before naming their daughter after her personal family nickname. Lawyers for the couple subsequently accused the BBC of defamation and sent letters to various media organisations stating that the report was false and defamatory and should not be repeated, saying that Harry had spoken to the Queen before announcing their daughter's name.

In January 2024, two neo-Nazis, Christopher Gibbons and Tyrone Patten-Walsh, were sentenced to between eight and 11 years in prison for terrorism offences, which included calling for the deaths of Harry and his son Archie on their podcast.

In April 2026, Harry and Meghan's team refused to provide details of the couple's visit to Australia to Guardian Australia, alleging that the Daily Mail, Daily Mirror and Sky News Australia had broken a strict embargo on the couple's tour itinerary. Sky News Australia denied the allegations, after which the couple stated that, unlike the Mail, neither Sky News nor the Daily Mirror was "formally bound" by the embargo, but criticised them for reporting details revealed by the Mail. In September 2026, Harry and Meghan criticised two international photographers for "walking the perimeter" of their children's school, describing their conduct as an "unacceptable intrusion" into the privacy of children.

=== Interviews ===
Harry and his wife were interviewed by Oprah Winfrey in a television special for CBS, broadcast on 7 March 2021. Meghan spoke about marriage, motherhood, and the pressures of public life. Harry joined her later, and the pair talked about the initial difficulties associated with their move to the US in 2020 and their plans for the future. During the interview, Harry criticised his father's parenting style, said that his father had stopped answering his calls and had cut him off financially, and discussed his relationship with his brother. There was a wide and polarised reaction to the interview.

In April 2022, Harry was interviewed by Today's Hoda Kotb during the Invictus Games, saying that he had visited his grandmother the Queen earlier to make sure that she was "protected and got the right people around her." In January 2023, ahead of the release of his memoir Spare, Harry gave a series of interviews, including one with Anderson Cooper on 60 Minutes, one with Tom Bradby titled Harry: The Interview on ITV1, an interview on The Late Show with Stephen Colbert and one with Michael Strahan on Good Morning America, titled Prince Harry: In His Own Words. In the interview with Bradby, Harry said that he "would like to get my father back, I would like to have my brother back". Referring to the press as "the devil", he also alleged that "certain members" of his family were "in the bed" with them to "rehabilitate their image".

In a live-streamed interview with Harry in March 2023, physician Gabor Maté suggested that Harry could have PTSD, ADD, anxiety, and depression based on their conversation and his reading of Spare. Tickets to watch the livestream cost $33.09, with each ticket including a copy of Spare.

In May 2025, Harry was interviewed by Nada Tawfik of the BBC, during which he reflected on his loss of taxpayer-funded security and his ongoing estrangement from his family. Writing for The Guardian, Stephen Bates stated that Harry's "megaphone diplomacy isn't working" and "his private security needs are probably not near the top of anybody's priorities".

In December 2025, he appeared again on The Late Show with Stephen Colbert as part of a sketch in which he made comments mocking US president Donald Trump and referring to the controversy surrounding the decision to cancel the show.

=== On social media and other platforms ===
In October 2021, Twitter analytics service Bot Sentinel alleged that 83 accounts with a combined 187,631 followers were responsible for approximately 70% of the negative content posted about Harry and Meghan. The report prompted an investigation by Twitter. Twitter stated that it found no evidence of "widespread coordination" between the accounts and that it had taken action against users who violated its conduct policy. Bot Sentinel released three more reports in the following months. In January 2022, the BBC named Harry and Meghan among people whose photos and videos were used in fake instant-profits advertisements and bitcoin-related investment schemes.

== Titles, styles, honours and arms ==
=== Titles and styles ===
Harry was originally styled, as a son of the Prince of Wales, "His Royal Highness Prince Henry of Wales". He was known as the pseudonym "Captain Harry Wales" as a military officer.

On the morning of his wedding, Elizabeth II granted him the Dukedom of Sussex, the Earldom of Dumbarton and Barony of Kilkeel. He thus became known as "His Royal Highness The Duke of Sussex".

On 18 January 2020, Buckingham Palace announced that, following their decision to step back from royal duties, from 31 March 2020 Harry and Meghan would be known as the Duke and Duchess of Sussex; they would retain, but not publicly use, the style of Royal Highness. They continue to be referred to as "HRH" in legal settings and sometimes privately. A letter from the Lord Chamberlain, issued at the direction of King Charles III in 2026, reaffirmed that their HRH styles were still in abeyance.

While on his gap year in Lesotho in 2003, Harry was given the nickname Mohale (transl. 'the warrior'), a name that belonged to the younger brother of Moshoeshoe I.

=== Military ranks ===
United Kingdom

- (United Kingdom) 8 May 2005: Officer cadet, The Royal Military Academy Sandhurst
- (United Kingdom) 13 April 2006: Cornet (Second Lieutenant), The Blues and Royals
- (United Kingdom) 13 April 2008: Lieutenant, The Blues and Royals
- (United Kingdom) 16 April 2011: Captain, The Blues and Royals
- (United Kingdom) 14 May 2018: Lieutenant Commander, Royal Navy
- (United Kingdom) 14 May 2018: Major, Army
- (United Kingdom) 14 May 2018: Squadron Leader, Royal Air Force

=== Honours ===
- 6 February 2002: Recipient of the Queen Elizabeth II Golden Jubilee Medal
- 5 May 2008: Recipient of the Operational Service Medal for Afghanistan
- 6 February 2012: Recipient of the Queen Elizabeth II Diamond Jubilee Medal
- 4 June 2015: Knight Commander of the Royal Victorian Order (KCVO)
- 6 February 2022: Recipient of the Queen Elizabeth II Platinum Jubilee Medal

Foreign

- (Spain) 12 July 2017: Order of Isabella the Catholic

==== Wear of orders, decorations, and medals ====
The ribbons worn regularly by Harry in undress uniform are as follows:

Ribbons of the Duke of Sussex

==== Appointments ====
- 13 October 2018 – 19 February 2021: Personal Aide-de-Camp to Her Majesty The Queen (ADC)

Fellowships

- (Jamaica) 6 March 2012 – present: Honorary Fellow of the University of the West Indies

==== Former honorary military appointments ====
United Kingdom

- (United Kingdom) 8 August 2006 – 19 February 2021: Commodore-in-Chief of Small Ships and Diving
- (United Kingdom) 3 October 2008 – 19 February 2021: Honorary Air Commandant of RAF Honington
- 19 December 2017 – 19 February 2021: Captain General Royal Marines

The honorary military appointments above were returned to Elizabeth II in February 2021.

Canada

- (Canada) 10 November 2009 – present: Honorary Canadian Ranger

==== Awards ====
In December 2010, the German charity Ein Herz für Kinder ("A Heart for Children") awarded him its Golden Heart Award, in recognition of his "charitable and humanitarian efforts". On 7 May 2012, the Atlantic Council awarded him its Distinguished Humanitarian Leadership Award. In August 2018, the Royal Canadian Legion awarded him the 2018 Founders Award for his role in founding the Invictus Games. In October 2018, he was presented with the RSA Badge in Gold, the organisation's highest honour, for his work with injured veterans. In July 2021, Harry and Meghan were among those selected by UK-based charity Population Matters to receive the Change Champions Award for their decision to have only two children and help maintain a smaller and more sustainable population. In February 2022, Harry and Meghan were selected to receive the NAACP's President's Award for their work on causes related to social justice and equity. In October 2022, the couple were named as Ripple of Hope Award laureates for their work on racial justice, mental health, and other social initiatives through their foundation Archewell. Harry was inducted into the Living Legends of Aviation in January 2024. He received the Pat Tillman Award for Service during the 2024 ESPY Awards ceremony, recognising his service in the British Armed Forces and work with the Invictus Games, although Tillman's mother said that the award should have gone to "more fitting" recipients. In October 2025, he and his wife received the Humanitarians of the Year award at Project Healthy Minds' annual gala in New York City in recognition of their commitment to mental health support.

=== Arms ===
Coat of arms of the Duke of Sussex
Notes On his 18th birthday, Harry was granted his own personal coat of arms, consisting of the Arms of the Sovereign in right of the United Kingdom with a Label for difference. The College of Arms pre-announced his change of Label from five points to three, when his father acceded to the throne. Granted 15 September 2002 Crest On a Coronet of a child of the Sovereign a Lion statant guardant Or, crowned with a like Coronet and differenced by a Label as in the Arms. Escutcheon The Royal Arms differenced by a Label of three points Argent, each point charged with an Escallop Gules. Supporters As with the Royal Arms differenced by a like Coronet and Label. Orders The Royal Victorian Order circlet. VICTORIA Banner The Royal Standard of the United Kingdom labelled for difference as in his Arms. (in Scotland) Symbolism As he is the child of the sovereign, Harry's arms display a Label of three points. The escallops (seashells) allude to his mother Diana, Princess of Wales, whose Spencer coat of arms includes three Escallops Argent. Previous versions Arms between 2002 and 2015 Arms between 2015 and 2022

== Ancestry ==
Agnatically, Harry is a member of the House of Glücksburg, a cadet branch of the House of Oldenburg, one of Europe's oldest royal houses. Harry's paternal grandmother, Elizabeth II, issued letters patent on 8 February 1960 declaring his father to be a member of the House of Windsor.

Harry's paternal ancestors include members of most of the royal families of Europe, while his maternal ancestors include the earls Spencer – a cadet branch of the Spencer family descended from the earls of Sunderland; the senior branch are now also dukes of Marlborough; the Barons Fermoy; and more anciently from Henry FitzRoy, 1st Duke of Grafton; and Charles Lennox, 1st Duke of Richmond – two illegitimate sons of King Charles II.

Harry and his brother William descend matrilineally from Eliza Kewark (18th-century), who is variously described in contemporary documents as "a dark-skinned native woman", "an Armenian woman from Bombay", and "Mrs. Forbesian". Genealogist William Addams Reitwiesner believed that Kewark was Armenian. In June 2013, BritainsDNA announced that genealogical DNA tests on two of Harry and William's distant matrilineal cousins confirmed that Kewark was matrilineally of Indian descent.

== Filmography ==
Television appearances
Year	Title	Network	Notes	Ref.
2004	The Forgotten Kingdom: Prince Harry in Lesotho	ITN / ITV	Also producer	
2012	The Diamond Queen	BBC		
2014	Harry's South Pole Heroes	ITV		
2016	Our Queen at 90	ITV		
2016	Elizabeth at 90: A Family Tribute	BBC		
2016	Prince Harry in Africa	ITV		
2017	Diana, Our Mother: Her Life and Legacy	ITV		
2017	Diana, 7 Days	BBC		
2018	Queen of the World	HBO		
2019	Harry & Meghan: An African Journey	ITV		
2020	Rising Phoenix	Netflix		
2021	Oprah with Meghan and Harry	CBS		
2021	The Me You Can't See	Apple TV	Also producer	
2022	Harry & Meghan	Netflix		
2022	Live to Lead	Netflix	Executive producer and presenter	
2023	Harry: The Interview	ITV1		
2023	60 Minutes	CBS		
2023	Prince Harry: In His Own Words	ABC		
2023	Heart of Invictus	Netflix	Also producer	
2024	Tabloids on Trial	ITV1		
2024	Polo	Netflix	Executive producer	
2025	With Love, Meghan	Netflix		

== Bibliography ==
=== Books ===
- "Foreword", in: Connaughton, Chris (2021). Hospital by the Hill. Archived from the original on 20 March 2021.
- Prince Harry, The Duke of Sussex (2023). Spare. Random House. ISBN 978-0-593-59380-6. OCLC 1356405890.
- "Foreword", in: Boyes, Steve (2026). Okavango and the Source of Life: Exploring Africa's Lost Headwaters. Penguin Random House. ISBN 978-1-426-22407-2. Archived from the original on 30 January 2026.

=== Authored articles and letters ===
- Prince Harry, Duke of Sussex (2019). "I have always loved wild places". African Parks. Archived from the original on 30 June 2020.
- Prince Harry, The Duke of Sussex (6 August 2020). "Social media is dividing us. Together, we can redesign it". Fast Company. Archived from the original on 6 August 2020.
- Prince Harry; Reinhold Mangundu (14 October 2021). "Protect the Okavango River Basin from corporate drilling". The Washington Post. Archived from the original on 14 October 2021.
- Tedros Adhanom Ghebreyesus; Prince Harry, The Duke of Sussex; Meghan, The Duchess of Sussex (29 October 2021). "Meeting the COVID-19 vaccine commitments". World Health Organization. Archived from the original on 29 October 2021.
- Prince Harry, The Duke of Sussex (1 December 2021). "Letter from Prince Harry to Dr Tedros Adhanom Ghebreyesus and Ms Winnie Byanyima on World AIDS Day". UNAIDS. Archived from the original on 1 December 2021.
- Prince Harry; Chris Coons; Hailemariam Desalegn Boshe (15 December 2022). "The future of conservation is taking shape in Africa". HuffPost. Archived from the original on 15 December 2022.
- Prince Harry (5 November 2025). "The Bond, The Banter, The Bravery: What it means to be British". Sussex.com.
- Prince Harry, Duke of Sussex (7 May 2026). "At 100, David Attenborough's voice is a lesson in wonder and planetary stewardship". Time.
- Prince Harry (14 May 2026). "My fears for a divided kingdom". The New Statesman.

== Footnotes ==
Prince Harry, Duke of Sussex House of Windsor Born: 15 September 1984
Lines of succession
Preceded by Prince Louis of Wales	Succession to the British throne 5th in line	Followed by Prince Archie of Sussex
Peerage of the United Kingdom
Vacant 1st creation extinct in 1843 Title last held by Prince Augustus Frederick	Duke of Sussex; 2nd creation 2018–present	Incumbent; Heir apparent: Prince Archie of Sussex
Orders of precedence in the United Kingdom
Preceded by The Prince of Wales	Gentlemen; The Duke of Sussex	Followed by Prince George of Wales
