= Ben McBean =

British Royal Marine veteran and motivational speaker

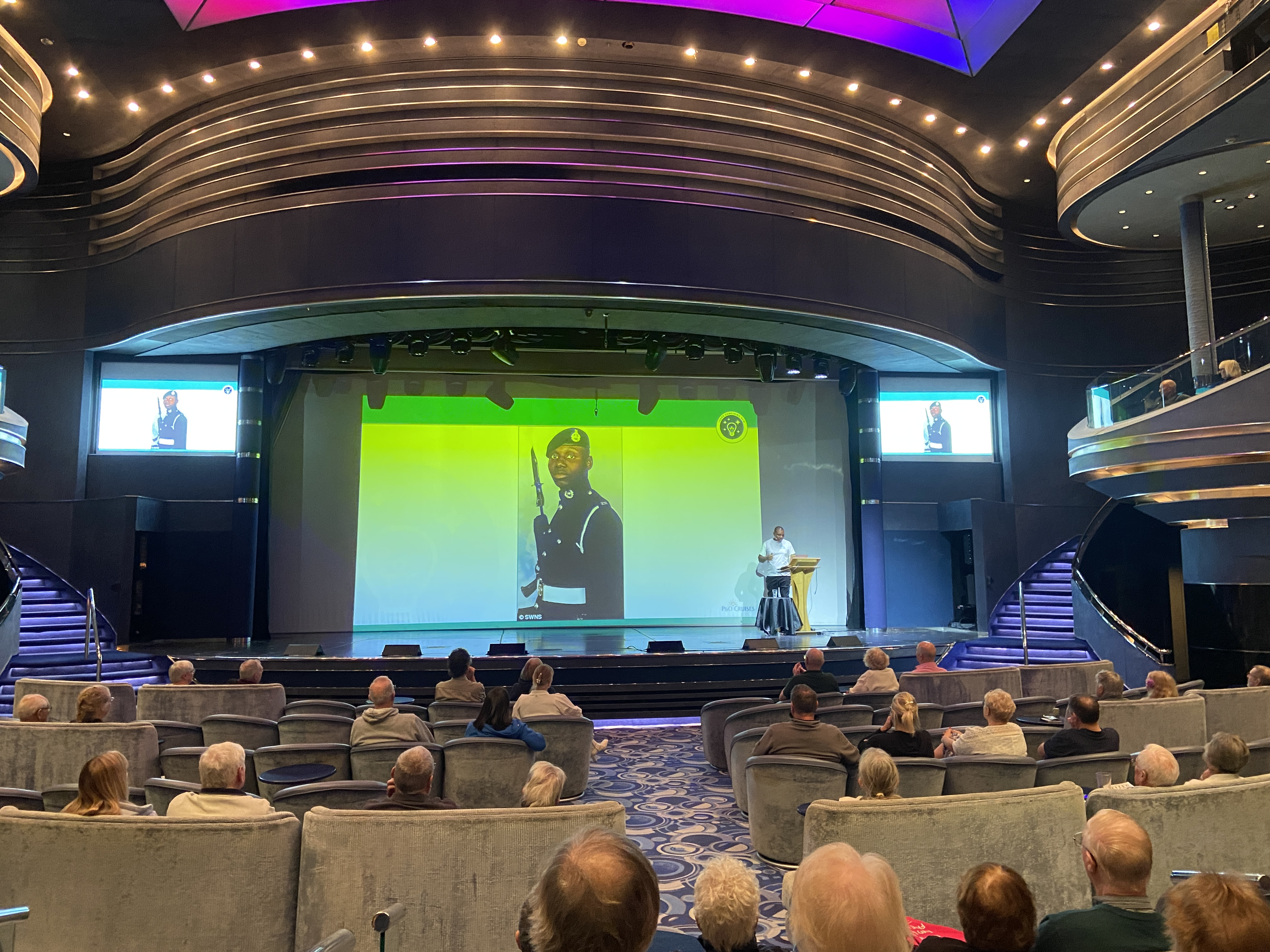
- Ben McBean speaking on P&O Cruises' Arcadia, 4 January 2026
- Born: 1 March 1987 (age 39); Nuneaton, Warwickshire
- Children: 2
- Military career
- Allegiance: United Kingdom
- Branch: Royal Navy (Royal Marines)
- Unit: 40 Commando Royal Marines
- Conflicts: War in Afghanistan

Ben McBean (born 1987) is a former Royal Marine Commando. He survived catastrophic, life-changing injuries as a result of an IED explosion during his deployment in 2008 to Afghanistan. He was hailed as the 'real hero' by Prince Harry after sharing a flight home from Afghanistan when he was immediately pulled out of the country when his presence there was leaked by the media .

== Early life ==
McBean was born in Nuneaton, Warwickshire, on 1 March 1987. McBean didn't know who his biological father was, with his father having left when he was a child. From the age of 2-years-old, McBean was raised by his stepfather. When McBean was around 10 or 11-years-old, he moved to Plymouth, Devon. This was due to McBean's uncle (his stepfather's brother and also a Royal Marine Commando), being based there.

McBean dreamt of becoming a Royal Marine since he was aged 10. At aged 12-years-old, McBean was inspired by seeing his uncle and colleagues at his uncle's wedding, wearing military dress and wanted to be 'one of them'. McBean was also inspired to become a Royal Marine by a book he read about the Special Boat Service (SBS). When he was aged 13, McBean's uncle started taking him for runs, with McBean carrying a bergen with dumbbell's in it.

Whilst at school, McBean was into sports, particularly rugby and boxing, with the latter McBean describing as having a natural ability.

McBean attended Lipson Community College, Plymouth, where he completed his GCSEs. By the time he was 16-years-old, all that McBean was focused on was joining the Royal Marines.

== Military career ==
=== Application ===
When McBean initially applied to join the Royal Marines, he was rejected, being told that his shoulders 'weren't big enough', even prior to completing a fitness test. He was told to bulk himself up, before he returned, but hadn't put on any weight. However, McBean believed that because he'd made a point of returning, when he could have pursued other employment, his application was accepted in 2006, when he was aged 16-years-old.

=== Training ===
McBean completed his initial training at Commando Training Centre Royal Marines (CTCRM) in Lympstone, Devon. Out of approximately 60 recruits, only 11 made it to the final selection.

McBean then joined 40 Commando, Royal Marines, based in Taunton, Somerset. At that time, 40 Commando were preparing to be deployed to Afghanistan. McBean later stated that there was no official announcement that 40 Commando were going to be deployed to Afghanistan, however, he and colleagues were involved in a lot of live firing exercises, including in Denmark.

=== Deployment ===
In 2008, aged 20, McBean was deployed to Afghanistan. He flew out of RAF Brize Norton to Kandahar, before spending approximately a week at Camp Bastion. 40 Commando were flown to Kajaki, Helmand Province via Chinook helicopter, flanked by two Apache helicopters.

They were tasked with protecting the Kajaki Dam and the surrounding area. McBean described how there 'wasn't really anything going on', with him and colleagues patrolling and 'waiting to get into a fight' and every so often 'getting into a contact' with the enemy.

McBean stated that for him, 'everything was a first' and he didn't know what to expect.

=== IED incident ===
Four-and-a-half-months into his tour (of sixth months), on 28 February 2008, McBean awoke and heard his own voice in his head say: 'You're going to get killed today or really badly injured', in a calm, but loud way. Confused, the voice disappeared, with McBean attempting to get rehear it, but it wouldn't reappear. Although it sounded like his own voice, he questioned whether it was really him and was spooked.

Furthermore, McBean's unit had an iPod, which they used to play music by Linkin Park, in order to 'get in the zone' whilst they got ready. McBean's night-vision goggles also stopped working and McBean felt as if his bergan had become heavier and it hurt his back and spine (despite it being the same weight).

McBean felt that something wasn't right. As a result of what had happened, before the unit left, McBean shook the hands of his colleagues, who told him to 'shut up' and to just get ready. McBean got ready and went out on patrol.

Later that day, McBean and colleagues were on patrol, when they ran towards a compound to see who was inside it and to clear it. As he got towards a hole at the wall of the compound, an IED exploded.

"So we're running and then just 'boom'. Not...it weren't even like a loud bang, it was just like...like a deep bang, went right through my body. And when I opened my eyes, I was upside down in the air..."

— Ben McBean speaking to Phil Campion on 'The Debrief' show on Force TV, June 2023

McBean was thrown approximately 20 feet into the air. Having landed on the ground, McBean felt as if a person was stood on his chest. His first thought was wanting to take his body armour off, as he couldn't breathe. He attempted to take it off, however, he felt his right arm was weak. When he attempted to use his left arm, it was twisted. McBean tapped his left arm and his fingers and couldn't feel anything, describing it as 'ruined', noticing he had a hole in his right arm, noting there was dirt in it and thinking how it would get infected. Sitting up, McBean saw that his whole shin bone on his right leg was sticking out, with no foot on the end, noticing bits of flesh and ammunition on the ground.

"Suddenly I was on the floor and my right leg was gone. The whole shin bone was gone, and my foot was missing. My arm was gone, I had a big hole in my arse cheek, there was a hole in my groin and I was lying in a big ditch covered in blood. I was a mess. I'd broken my leg before, which was painful, but I knew this time I’m dead. There’s no comeback from this. I somehow crawled around for a little bit and met some other guys, and we tried to sort each other out. I somehow survived."

— Ben McBean speaking to LBC, June 2023

McBean and colleagues received catastrophic injuries, which amongst other injuries, resulted in McBean losing his right leg through the knee and left arm. McBean later explained that he first thought that he wanted to die, describing the horrendous amount of pain he was in, meaning he was not able to think straight. Later, during the incident, he realised that he didn't want to die after he had survived for some time after the incident. McBean lay on the ground, thinking about his family.

"I just accepted it was the end and then, just see if I wake up or not."

— Ben McBean speaking to Phil Campion on 'The Debrief' show on Force TV, June 2023

Medics arrived in around 20 minutes and McBean was rescued and extracted by Chinook helicopter for initial treatment at Camp Bastion. Whilst there, the remains of McBean's injured leg and arm were removed before he was repatriated to the Royal Centre for Defence Medicine at Selly Oak Hospital, Birmingham; he wasn't expected to survive the flight. On the flight was Prince Harry, who hailed McBean the ' real hero' and stated how 'humbled' he felt by the bravery of McBean.

=== Medical discharge from the Royal Marines ===
McBean was discharged from the Royal Marines in 2010.

McBean later noted that when he awoke in hospital and noted his injuries, he knew that his time in the Royal Marines was over.

== Rehabilitation ==
=== Physical injuries ===
McBean awoke in intensive care at Selly Oak Hospital on his 21st birthday.

McBean wasn't sure where he was, however, he knew that he was safe, noting a 'white and normal' ceiling, which he knew couldn't have been Afghanistan. He was aware of what had happened, however, he was shocked to find that he could still feel his fingers on his left arm, despite the lower half of his arm having been removed. McBean later stated that the bandage on his arm was quite large due to the swelling and it wasn't until a few days later that he found he had lost it.

McBean awoke one morning to find a priest praying next to him, which made him realise that he still wasn't well. McBean said that he blinked and that it must have been a few days later, noting that he had been taken out of intensive care. It was when he was in a room on his own in the burns and plastics department, that he was sat up properly for the first time, noting his injuries and medical instruments and equipment connected to him.

McBean's colleagues, who had been injured during the incident and also repatriated alongside McBean to Selly Oak Hospital, were critically injured, with some in comas. One of McBean's colleagues, Mark, still thought that he and his colleagues were in Afghanistan. McBean later noted that Mark jumped out of his bed, attempting to rescue McBean and on one occasion, ripped medical wires out of McBean's neck.

McBean spent approximately five weeks in Selly Oak Hospital, before being transferred to the army's rehabilitation centre at Headley Court Military Hospital in Surrey, where he spent an additional ten months continuing his rehabilitation. From there, McBean continued his rehabilitation at HMS Drake within the naval base in Devonport.

"If I'd lost my limbs because I'd got drunk and fallen in front of a car I'd feel differently. But I was doing a job I love. We all knew the risks and we took them in good faith. In many ways it was the best time of my life...I'm alive, aren't I? I'm the same person. I'm just missing two limbs, which I lost fighting for my country. How can I complain about that?"

— Ben McBean speaking to The Times, March 2009

Whilst in hospital, only weeks after the explosion, McBean watched the TV coverage of the London Marathon, which gave him the goal of running the marathon, which drove him beginning rehabilitation. He was training for the marathon even before a month had passed since he was injured and despite the running leg rubbing the skin until it bled.

The NHS initially gave McBean a white prosthetic arm, which forced him and his family to pay £7,000 to a private hospital for a black prosthetic. The NHS later apologised and covered the costs of a current prosthetics and previous prosthetics.

=== Mental health ===
Despite McBean making what was described as an 'excellent physical recovery', in the years that followed his initial injuries, he struggled mentally, suffering with Post Traumatic Stress Disorder (PTSD). He noted that he lived in the back of his car for around four months, despite having a home, as he 'couldn't be near any human beings'. McBean noted how he would sit in his car and drink beer, thinking about different ways of ending his life. During this time, he would check in with his fiancée to tell her he was still alive before eventually returning home and gradually began recovering.

"It’s hard to enjoy talking about the worst day of your life, and what I’ve gone through, as well as the mental health issues. Even though I don’t want to relive it, it might help someone."

— Ben McBean speaking to LBC, June 2023

== Other ventures ==
=== Charity ===
McBean has helped various charities, including Help For Heroes, the Royal British Legion and the British Limbless Ex-Service Men's Association.

In 2009, in aid of Help for Heroes, McBean ran the London Marathon, completing it in a time of six hours, 20 minutes and 24 seconds. A year later, McBean ran the 2010 edition of the marathon, completing it 4 minutes faster.

In 2014, McBean raised £16,545 for the Royal British Legion, completing a 30-mile run around London, creating the outline of a giant poppy.

=== Motivational speaking ===
McBean notes that whilst his story 'sounds bad' because he 'got blown up and almost died', there are a lot of positives. He notes that whilst his injury lasted 'one second', it is his mentality that he talks about and how although things in life can get tough, it's how a person reacts to something that matters.

"When you get blown up by a bomb you’re supposed to die, but I survived. Sometimes I dream that I didn’t get blown up."

— Ben McBean speaking to LBC, June 2023

=== Media ===
In 2012, McBean featured on series 18, episode 4 of BBC motoring show Top Gear, where he and other soldiers in standard mobility scooters raced Jeremy Clarkson, Richard Hammond and James May in their own-made mobility scooters. The team of soldiers won.

In 2023, McBean presented an episode entitled 'For Crown and Country' for ITV's documentary series 'Fresh Cuts'. In the episode, McBean highlighted and uncovered the contribution made by black British Armed Forces servicemen and women across history, as well as his own military experience.

== Personal life ==
McBean has been married twice and has two children.

=== Issues with blue badge ===
In 2009, McBean was stripped of his blue badge, a parking permit scheme for disabled drivers, after Plymouth City Council found McBean had taken part in the London Marathon and that he could run 50 metres. McBean gave up trying to get the badge again, however, it was returned to him after support from Plymouth MP and veterans minister Johnny Mercer.

On 5 February 2021, whilst attending an appointment at Derriford Hospital, Plymouth, a woman began 'effing and blinding' at McBean, calling him a 'Government draining dickhead' for having used a blue badge, despite him being entitled to do so.

On 17 May 2023, whilst out shopping in Plymouth, McBean was fined by a parking warden, after they tapped on his window, insisting his badge was 'fake'. This was after a woman in a coffee shop overlooking the car park shook her head and followed McBean outside saying 'excuse me'.

However, in 2024, when McBean submitted a renewal application, Plymouth City Council officials said he didn't meet the requirements, with McBean telling The Sun newspaper: 'I don't understand how much more disabled I need to be'. Plymouth City Council published a response stating that McBean had been refused as he had submitted the application under a different name, meaning his details were not recognised.

== Honours and awards ==
=== Honours ===
Ribbon	Description	Notes
	Operational Service Medal for Afghanistan	Awarded 14 May 2008

=== Awards ===
On 18 May 2008, McBean received the 'Outstanding Global Achievement' award at the Britain's Best Award, held at London Television Studio. He received the award from then Prime Minister, Gordon Brown.

On 15 December 2009, McBean received the 'Overcoming Adversity' award at The Sun Military Awards, held at Imperial War Museum London. The award was in recognition of being the first double amputee to finish the London Marathon.

In 2012, McBean was awarded the Rotary Young Citizen award by the Rotary Club.
