= The Me You Can't See =

2021 documentary series by Oprah Winfrey and Prince Harry, Duke of Sussex

- Official poster
- Genre: Documentary series
- Directed by: Asif Kapadia; Dawn Porter
- Presented by: Oprah Winfrey; Prince Harry, Duke of Sussex
- Composer: Antônio Pinto
- Country of origin: United States
- Original language: English
- No. of episodes: 6

Production
- Executive producers: Oprah Winfrey; Prince Harry, Duke of Sussex; Terry Wood; Catherine Cyr; Alexander H. Browne; Jon Kamen; Dave Sirulnick; Asif Kapadia; Dawn Porter; Kahane Cooperman
- Producer: Jen Isaacson
- Cinematography: Erik Messerschmidt
- Editor: Spencer Averick (lead)
- Running time: 47–60 minutes
- Production companies: Harpo Productions; RadicalMedia

Original release
- Network: Apple TV+
- Release: May 21 – May 28, 2021

The Me You Can't See is an American documentary series on mental health streaming on Apple TV+, and hosted by Oprah Winfrey and Prince Harry, Duke of Sussex. The series has five parts and involves notable figures such as performer Lady Gaga, actress Glenn Close and basketball player DeMar DeRozan. The Me You Can't See was released in full on May 21, 2021. A follow-up town hall-style conversation special, titled "A Path Forward", was released on the same platform on May 28, featuring participants and advisers from the main episodes.

== Episodes ==
No.	Title	Original release date
1	"Say It Out Loud"	May 21, 2021
2	"Asking for Help"	May 21, 2021
3	"Finding What Works"	May 21, 2021
4	"We Need Each Other"	May 21, 2021
5	"This Is Me"	May 21, 2021
Special
6	"A Path Forward"	May 28, 2021

== Production ==
In April 2019, it was announced that Harry was working as co-creator and executive producer on a documentary series about mental health together with Oprah Winfrey, which was initially set to air in 2020 on Apple TV+. It was later announced that the series would be released on May 21, 2021, under the title The Me You Can't See.

== Reception ==
On Rotten Tomatoes, the series has an approval rating of 87% based on 15 reviews. On Metacritic, it has a score of 64 out of 100, based on 9 critics, indicating "generally favorable" reviews. The series became the most-watched program worldwide since its May 21 premiere on Apple TV+. 25% new viewers joined the service after the program premiered and average weekend viewership in the UK increased by more than 40%.

In June 2021, BuzzFeed News published an article that described purported "inconsistencies and omissions" in Harry's claims during the documentary when compared to previous interviews.
