= Blue Badges in England =

Disabled parking permit scheme

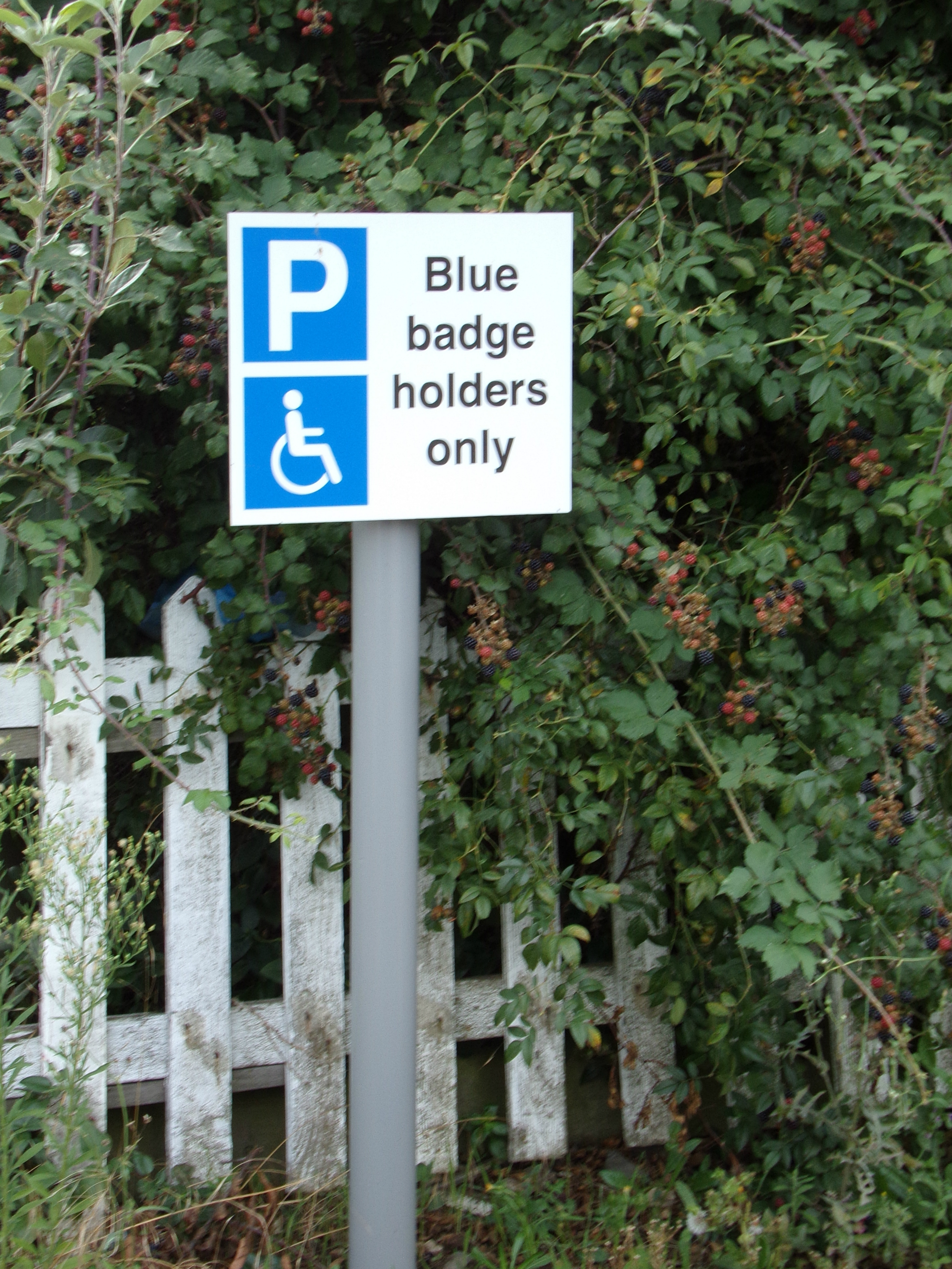
A Blue badge holders only road sign in Lawford, Essex

The Blue Badge scheme provides a national arrangement of parking concessions for disabled people in England. The scheme is intended for on-street parking only. It does not apply to off-street car parks, whether local authority or privately owned.

== History ==
The First Blair ministry undertook a comprehensive review of the Blue Badge scheme in 1999 which was followed by a discussion paper that formed the basis of a public consultation that ended in 2002. In its response, the Disabled Persons Transport Advisory Committee (DPTAC) made a list of recommendations, primarily on the eligibility requirements, the administration of the scheme, the types of concessions permitted, and the enforcement of the scheme. In December 2002, the then Secretary of State for Transport, David Jamieson, announced that the government had considered the DPTAC recommendations and intended to take most of them forward. This resulted in various legislative changes between 2004 and 2007.

The UK left the European Union on 31 January 2020 and is no longer part of the EU Disabled Parking Card scheme.

== See also ==
- Disabled parking permit
- Disabled parking permits of the United States
