= Mary-Frances O'Connor =

American psychologist

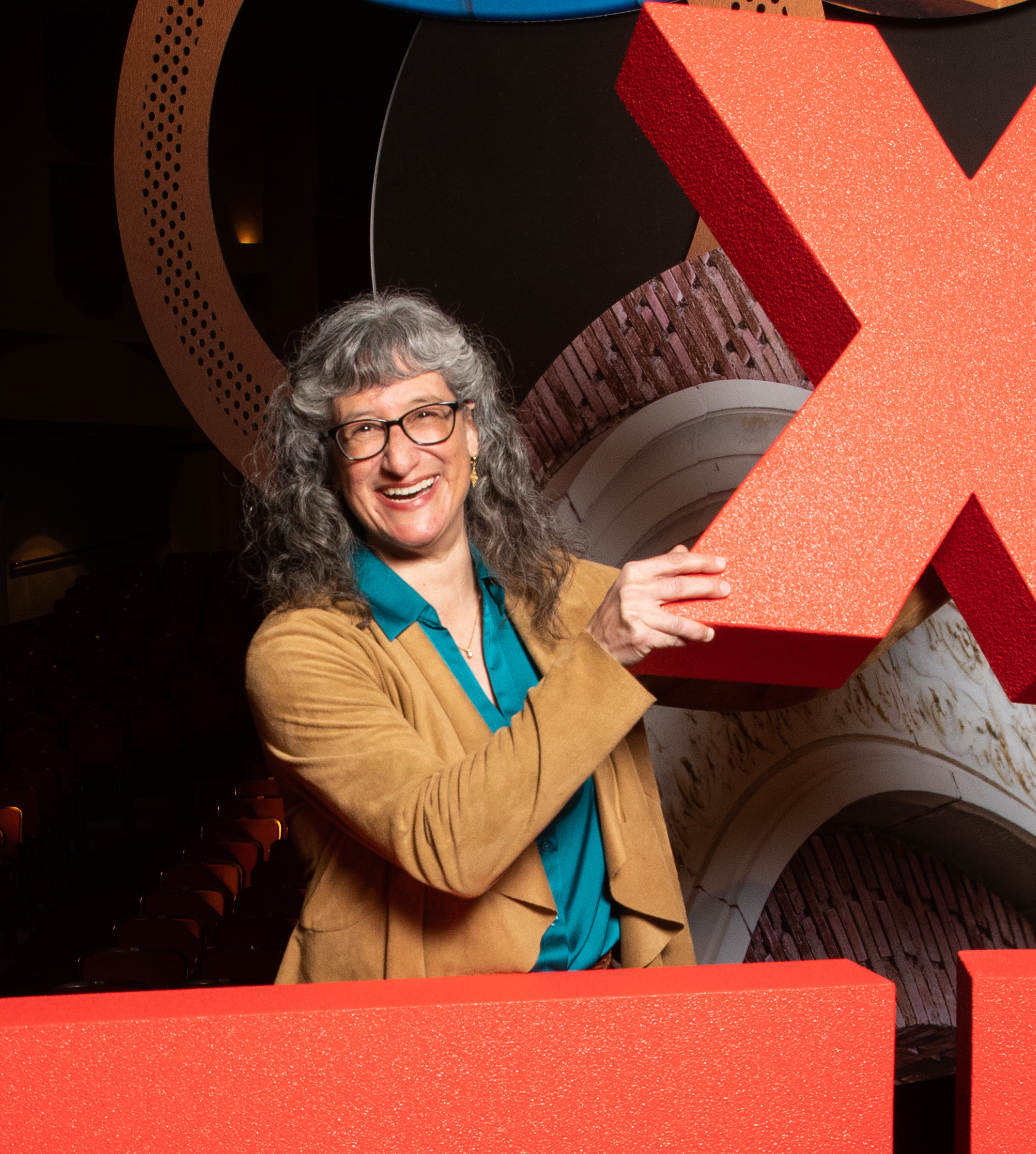
- Born: 1973 (age 52–53); Boulder, Colorado, U.S.
- Citizenship: United States; United Kingdom
- Education: Northwestern University; University of Arizona
- Awards: Patricia R. Barchas Award in Sociophysiology
- Scientific career
- Fields: Psychology, neuroscience Psychoneuroimmunology
- Workplaces: University of Arizona; University of California, Los Angeles
- Website: maryfrancesoconnor.org

Mary-Frances O'Connor (born 1973) is an American neuroscientist and clinical psychologist. She is a professor of psychology at the University of Arizona, where she directs the Grief, Loss, and Social Stress (GLASS) Lab. She has written two books on how the body and brain are affected by loss and grieving.

== Education and academic appointments ==
O'Connor was born in 1973 in Boulder, Colorado. After graduating from Northwestern University in 1996, she attended graduate school at the University of Arizona (UArizona) earning a PhD in Clinical Psychology in 2004. She completed a postdoctoral fellowship at the Cousins Center for Psychoneuroimmunology at UCLA, and held a faculty appointment at UCLA. She returned to UArizona in 2012. She was appointed an associate professor of psychology at UArizona in 2017 and professor in 2024.

== Career ==
O'Connor conducted the first fMRI neuroimaging study of bereavement, published in 2003. As a neuroscientist, O'Connor takes the approach that "grieving can be thought of as a form of learning." Learning is required to update the brain's prediction that the loved one will always be there, to the reality that they are truly gone, or the gone-but-also-everlasting hypothesis developed by O'Connor.

O'Connor believes that a clinical science approach toward the experience and physiology of grief can improve psychological treatment. Her research focuses on the neurobiological grief response to loss with function neuroimaging, cognitive tasks, and clinical interviews. O'Connor contributes to work demonstrating that bereavement is a health disparity. She is not a practicing clinical psychotherapist nor does she work with individual clients.

In 2020, O'Connor organized a multidisciplinary research group called the Neurobiology of Grief International Network (NOGIN). Under her leadership, the group has held four international conferences, with support provided by the National Institute on Aging for the 3rd conference in 2022.

== Honors and awards ==
- Fellow, Association for Psychological Science, 2019
- NPR SciFri Book Club Pick for "The Grieving Brain"
- Behavioral Scientists "Summer Book List 2022"

== Books ==
O'Connor's book The Grieving Brain: The Surprising Science of How We Learn from Love and Loss was published in 2022.
