= Tig =

TIG or Tig or variation, may refer to:

== Tig ==
Tig may refer to:

- Jimmy Tig (1938–2007), American R&B singer
- Patricia Maria Țig (born 1994), Romanian tennis player
- Tig Notaro (born 1971), American stand-up comic
- Tig Trager, a character in the television series Sons of Anarchy
- Tig, a character from the short film Woolly and Tig
- Tig (film), a 2015 documentary about comic Tig Notaro
- The Tig (website), a website founded by Meghan Markle
- Tig, another name for the game tag

== TIG ==
TIG may refer to:

- Change UK or The Independent Group for Change, a former British political party
- tetanus immune globulin, a medication
- Tungsten inert gas welding, or gas tungsten arc welding
- Titlagarh Junction railway station (station code: TIG), Odisha, India

== tig ==
tig may refer to:

- Tigre language (ISO 639 code: tig)
- tig (software), a browser for git version control

== See also ==
- TIG1 (tazarotene-induced gene-1)
- TIG Tennis Classic, California women's tennis open
- Tigs, a character from The Shiny Show
- TIGS, a grammar school
