= Multrees Walk =

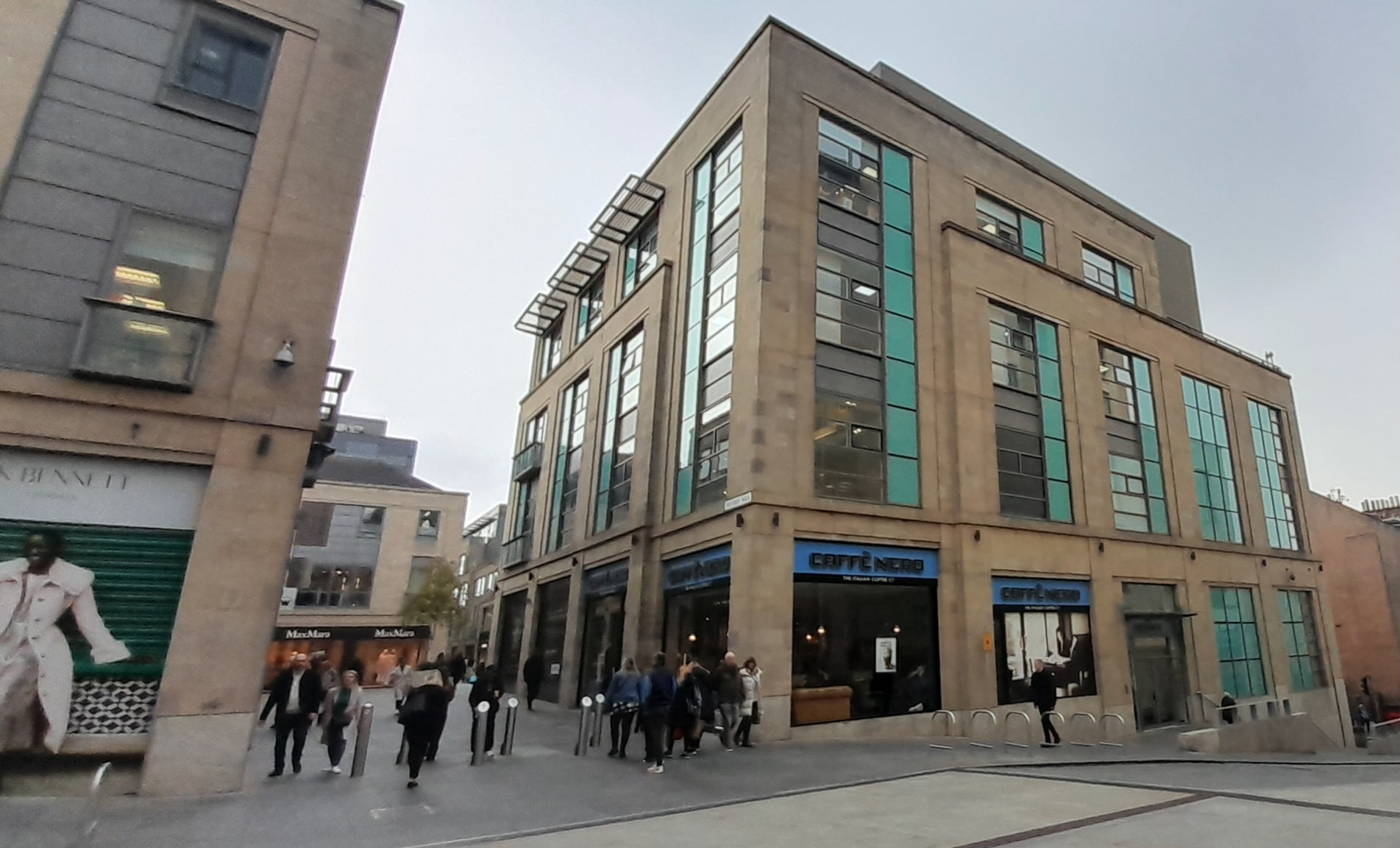
- View from the East in 2023
- Location: Edinburgh, Scotland, UK
- Coordinates: 55°57′18.48″N 3°11′29.70″W
- Address: Multrees Walk; Edinburgh; EH1 3DQ
- Opened: 2003
- Owner: Nuveen
- Architect: CDA Group
- Num. of anchor tenants: 1 (Harvey Nichols)
- Public transit: Edinburgh Waverley; St Andrew Square
- Website: multreeswalk.co.uk

Multrees Walk is a pedestrian shopping precinct in Edinburgh, Scotland.

== History ==
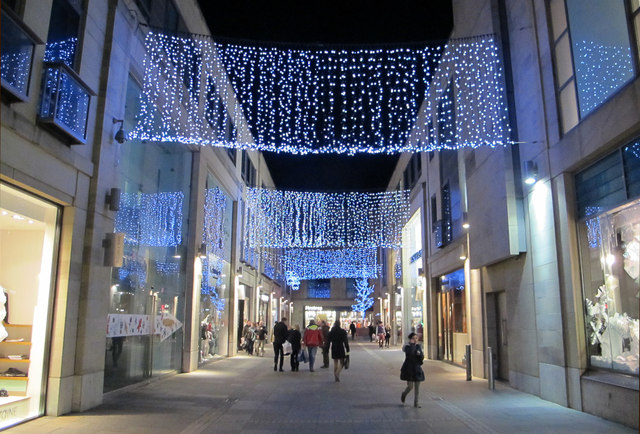
Christmas decorations in 2011

Initially opened as ‘The Walk’ in 2003 as part of a larger city centre redevelopment, Multrees Walk links St Andrew Square to the St James Quarter, lined on each side with designer stores selling clothing, artwork and various other luxury items.

Harvey Nichols department store is the anchor of the development and has its main entrance on St. Andrew Square, with a smaller entrance onto Multrees Walk.

Multrees Walk, Harvey Nichols and Edinburgh Bus Station were all designed by Edinburgh architects CDA. The bus station sits at a lower level from Multrees and is accessed by escalators from St Andrew Square, or by a ramped entrance from Elder Street.

St Andrew Square tram stop is to the front of Harvey Nichols.

Cycling is not permitted in Multrees Walk

== List of Stores ==
As at July 2024

Multrees Walk features a number of brands from across the globe, some of which are their only Scottish store.

These brands include:

- Harvey Nichols
- Louis Vuitton
- Gucci
- Longchamp
- Burberry
- Michael Kors
- Genesis

Other international:

- Swarovski
- Omega
- TAG Heuer
- Canada Goose
- Mappin & Webb
- Max Mara
- Mulberry

National and independent:

- Castle Fine Art
- Johnstons of Elgin
- LK Bennett
- Strathberry
- The Whisky Shop

== Recent Refurbishment ==
Louis Vuitton announced the reopening of their newly redeveloped store at 1-2 Multrees Walk in August 2023, which includes the addition of an upper floor and a spiral staircase.

The reopening marks their 20th anniversary in Multrees Walk.

In March 2024, Italian fashion brand Gucci announced they will be moving into Multrees Walk, opening their only stand-alone UK store outside of London, occupying the units previously held by Caffè Nero.

== Previous occupants ==
These names have since left. A few have relocated to elsewhere within the city, such as the new St James Quarter.

Shops on Multrees Walk in 2005

- Tommy Hilfiger
- Firetrap
- Sandro
- Pandora
- Nespresso
- The Pen Shop
- JoJo Maman Bébé
- Bravissimo
- Caffe Nero
- Kurt Geiger
- Valvona & Crolla Caffè Bar
- Hugo Boss
- Reiss
- Tesla
- Links of London

== See also ==
- Leading shopping districts by city
