= Matt de la Peña =

American children's writer

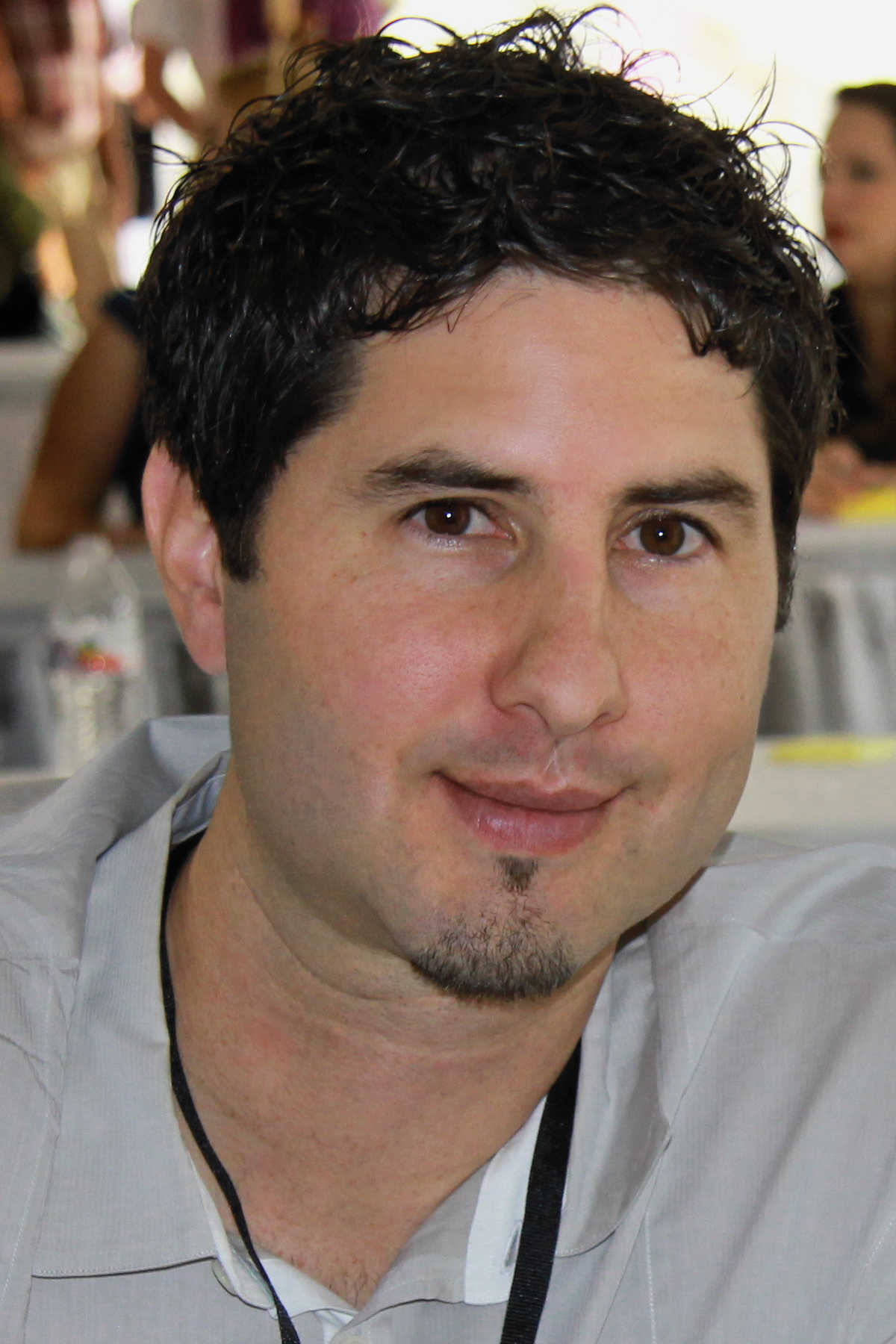
- De la Peña at the 2013 Texas Book Festival
- Born: California, United States
- Education: University of the Pacific (BA); San Diego State University (MFA)
- Occupations: Writer and educator
- Children: Luna de la Peña and Miguel de la Peña
- Writing career
- Period: 2005–present
- Genre: Young-adult novels
- Website: mattdelapena.com

Matthew de la Peña is an American writer of children's books who specializes in novels for young adults. He received the 2016 Newbery Medal for his book Last Stop on Market Street.

== Biography ==
A San Diego, California, native, Matt de la Peña completed a BA at University of the Pacific, when on a basketball scholarship and completed an MFA in creative writing at San Diego State University.

De la Peña had published Mexican WhiteBoy (2008), drawing on his own teenage passion for sports and Mexican heritage. The novel was banned from classrooms in Tucson, Arizona, starting in 2012, when lawmakers passed laws to remove materials containing "critical race theory," until 2017, when the court ruled the law violated the constitutional rights of Mexican American students.

In 2016, de la Peña was honored with the National Council of Teachers of English (NCTE) National Intellectual Freedom Award. In 2015, he wrote Last Stop on Market Street which won the 2016 Newbery Medal. In 2021, he published Milo Imagines the World, which was named to the 2022 Bank Street Children's Best Books of the Year List with an "Outstanding Merit" distinction and shared the committee's Josette Frank Award with Angeline Boulley's Firekeeper's Daughter.

As of 2022, he resides in southern California. He teaches creative writing at San Diego State University.

== Books ==
Year	Title	Illustrator	Publisher	Note
2005	Ball Don't Lie		Delacorte Press	Named a 2006 ALA-YALSA Best Book for Young Adults and an ALA-YALSA Quick Picks for Reluctant Readers, and developed into a motion picture in 2008 featuring Ludacris, Nick Cannon, and Emilie de Ravin.
2008	Mexican WhiteBoy		Delacorte Press	Named a 2009 ALA-YALSA Best Books for Young Adults (Top Ten Pick), and was featured on the 2008 Bulletin for the Center of Children's Literature Blue Ribbon List.
2009	We Were Here		Random House Inc	Named a 2010 ALA-YALSA Best Book for Young Adults, a 2010 ALA-YALSA Quick Picks for Reluctant Readers.
2010	I Will Save You			Named a 2011 ALA-YALSA Quick Pick for Reluctant Readers and a Junior Library Guild Selection.
2010	A Nation's Hope-The Story of Boxing Legend Joe Louis	Kadir Nelson		Received starred reviews from Booklist, Publishers Weekly and School Library Journal. A 2012 Bank Street Children's Book Committee's Best Book of the Year.
2013	Infinity Ring: Curse of the Ancients			
2013	Eternity			
2013	The Living			
2015	The Hunted		Penguin Random House	
2015	Last Stop on Market Street	Christian Robinson	Penguin Books	Won the 2016 Newbery Medal, a Coretta Scott King Illustrator Honor, and a Caldecott Honor. A 2016 Bank Street Children's Book Committee's Best Book of the Year with an "outstanding merit" distinction.
2018	Love	Loren Long		
2018	Carmela Full of Wishes	Christian Robinson		
2019	Superman: Dawnbreaker			
2021	Milo Imagines the World	Christian Robinson	G.P. Putnam's Sons Books for Young Readers	A New York Times Bestseller. A 2022 Bank Street Children's Book Committee's Best Book of the Year with an "outstanding merit" distinction and winner of the committee's Josette Frank Award for fiction for younger readers.
