= Firekeeper's Daughter =

2021 novel by Angeline Boulley

- Author: Angeline Boulley
- Language: English
- Genre: Young adult fiction, Thriller, Mystery
- Publisher: Henry Holt and Co.
- Publication date: March 16, 2021
- Publication place: United States
- Media type: Print
- ISBN: 9781250766564
- Followed by: Warrior Girl Unearthed

Firekeeper's Daughter is a young adult novel by Angeline Boulley, published March 16, 2021, by Henry Holt and Co. The book is a New York Times best seller and won the Edgar Allan Poe Award for Best Young Adult Novel in 2022. The sequel, Warrior Girl Unearthed, was published in 2023.

The book follows Daunis Fontaine, a half-native, half-white young adult who witnesses her friend's murder and becomes involved in an FBI investigation revolving around a new drug.

Boulley, who is Ojibwe, spent 10 years working on the novel as she researched "the intricacies of illegal drugs, to law enforcement, to hockey, to the ways of her own tribe, the Ojibwe people."

== Reception ==
Firekeeper's Daughter is a New York Times and IndieBound bestseller.

Time magazine named the book one of the "100 Best YA Books of All Time." It also received starred reviews from Booklist and Publishers Weekly.

Kristina Pino, writing for Booklist highlighted how Boulley "doesn’t shy away from or sugar-coat the very real circumstances that plague reservations across the country." She concluded that Firekeeper's Daughter is "an incredible thriller, not to be missed." Publishers Weekly wrote, "Hitting hard when it comes to issues such as citizenship, language revitalization, and the corrosive presence of drugs on Native communities, this novel will long stand in the hearts of both Native and non-Native audiences."

NPR called the novel "absolute powerhouse of a debut," saying the novel "is so, so much more than a thriller or a mystery. The author's love for and connection to her culture is so deeply engraved into the very heart of this book and it beats in rhythm with each new plot development. As a non-Indigenous reader, every depiction and explanation of Ojibwe philosophy and traditions felt like a gift, and every depiction of injustice felt like a call to action."

Kirkus called the novel "a suspenseful tale filled with Ojibwe knowledge, hockey, and the politics of status."

Firekeeper's Daughter was named to the Bank Street Children's Book Committee's Best Books of the Year List with an "Outstanding Merit" distinction and shared the committee's 2022 Josette Frank Award with Matt de la Peña and Christian Robinson's Milo Imagines the World.

Awards for Firekeeper's Daughter
Year	Award		Result	Ref.
2021	Booklist Editors' Choice	Books for Youth	Selection	
2021	Booklist Editors' Choice	Youth Audio	Selection	
2021	Goodreads Choice Award	Debut Novel	Finalist	
2021	Goodreads Choice Award	Young Adult	Winner	
2022	Edgar Allan Poe Award	Best Young Adult Novel	Winner	
2022	Josette Frank Award	—	Winner	
2022	Michael L. Printz Award	—	Winner	
2022	William C. Morris Award	—	Winner	
2022	Walter Dean Myers Award	—	Winner	
2023	Deutscher Jugendliteraturpreis	—	Nomination	

=== Audiobook ===
The audiobook, narrated by Isabella Star LaBlanc, received a starred review from Booklist, highlighted how LaBlanc, who is Sisseton-Wahpeton Dakota, handles the "Ojibwe phrases and traditions ... with ease." They further stated that "her voice is young and earnest and her fluency adds to the portrayal of Daunis ... LaBlanc’s sensitive reading will keep listeners plugged in."

== Adaptation ==
Barack and Michelle Obama's production company, Higher Ground, purchased the rights to adapt Firekeeper's Daughter into a TV series, which will be released on Netflix. The book will be adapted by Mickey Fisher and Wenonah Wilms, who is also Ojibwe.

In the production, Boulley has repeatedly stated that it is important to her that there are Indigenous individuals involved in the making of the series, both in front of and behind the camera.
