= Kelly DiPucchio =

American writer

- Born: March 7, 1967 (age 59); Warren, Michigan, U.S.
- Occupation: Writer
- Writing career
- Genre: Children's

Kelly DiPucchio (born March 7, 1967) is an American writer of children's books. DiPucchio was born in Warren, Michigan. She graduated from Michigan State University in 1989 in child psychology and development. She lives in Detroit, Michigan. Her books have been on the New York Times bestseller list.

== Work ==
DiPucchio's first published work, Bed Hogs (2004), is about a piglet who is the runt of the litter and has no room to sleep at night.

The story Grace for President (2008) was written after an editor's preschool girl asked why there were no women presidents of the United States. The story follows Grace, an African-American girl, as she runs in a mock election at her school. Grace for President is a "helpful introduction to the electoral system and empowering story for girls," according to Booklist. In the U.S. children have dressed up as Grace for Halloween. The book was listed on The New York Times Best Seller list in 2008.

DiPucchio collaborated with Queen Rania Al Abdullah of Jordan in the book, The Sandwich Swap (2010).

Zombie in Love (2011) is a love story about a zombie named Mortimer who finally meets the girls of his dreams. Kirkus Reviews wrote that DiPucchio's writing was "loaded with humorous understatement." Zombie in Love has been turned into a stage play written by Michelle Elliot and with music by Danny Larsen.

Crafty Chloe: Dress-Up Mess-Up (2013)provides "insight into the creative process" according to Kirkus Reviews.

Gaston (2014), a story about a bulldog being accidentally raised by poodles in a comic baby-mix-up story brings up the concepts of nature versus nurture and also about difficult concepts such as assimilation and gender. Publishers Weekly called Gaston a blend of sweetness and style.

Two of DiPucchio's stories, were IRA Teachers' Choices Reading List awardees: Grace for President was selected in 2009 and Gaston was selected in 2015. Gaston was also selected as a 2015 Notable Children's Book for younger readers by the Association for Library Service to Children. In 2014, she was awarded the Gwen Frostic Award, granted by the Michigan Reading Association to an illustrator or author from the state who has helped promote literacy. Crafty Chloe won the 2012 NAPPA Gold Award in the category of Preschoolers & Up. The Sandwich Swap was approved by the 2010 Parents Choice Award. This book was co-written by Queen Rania al Abdullah of Jordan and appeared on The New York Times Best Seller list in 2010.

== Publications ==
- Bed Hogs, illustrated by Howard Fine, Hyperion Books for Children (New York, NY), 2004 ISBN 978-0786818846
- Liberty's Journey, illustrated by Richard Egielski, Hyperion Books for Children (New York, NY), 2004 ISBN 978-0786818761
- Dinosnores, illustrated by Ponder Goembel, HarperCollins (New York, NY), 2005 ISBN 978-0060515775
- Mrs. McBloom, Clean Up Your Classroom!, illustrated by Guy Francis, Hyperion Books for Children (New York, NY), 2005 ISBN 978-0786809325
- What's the Magic Word?, illustrated by Marsha Winborn, HarperCollins (New York, NY), 2005 ISBN 978-0060005788
- Grace for President, illustrated by LeUyen Pham, Hyperion Books for Children (New York, NY), 2008 ISBN 978-1423139997
- Sipping Spiders through a Straw: Campfire Songs for Monsters, illustrated by Gris Grimly, Scholastic Press (New York, NY), 2008 ISBN 978-0439584012
- How to Potty Train Your Monster, illustrated by Mike Moon, Disney-Hyperion (New York, NY), 2009 ISBN 978-1423101826
- Alfred Zector, Book Collector, illustrated by Macky Pamintuan, Harper (New York, NY), 2010 ISBN 978-0060005818
- The Sandwich Swap, with Queen Rania al Abdullah, illustrated by Tricia Tusa, Disney-Hyperion Books (New York, NY), 2010 ISBN 978-1423124849
- Clink, illustrated by Matthew Myers, Balzer & Bray (New York, NY), 2011 ISBN 978-0061929281
- Gilbert Goldfish Wants a Pet, illustrated by Bob Shea, Dial Books for Young Readers (New York, NY), 2011 ISBN 978-0803733947
- Zombie in Love, illustrated by Scott Campbell, Atheneum Books for Young Readers (New York, NY), 2011 ISBN 978-1442402706
- Crafty Chloe, illustrated by Heather Ross, Atheneum Books for Young Readers (New York, NY), 2012 ISBN 978-1442421233
- Crafty Chloe: Dress-Up Mess-Up, illustrated by Heather Ross, Atheneum Books for Young Readers (New York, NY), 2013 ISBN 978-1442421240
- Gaston, illustrated by Christian Robinson, 2014 ISBN 978-1442451025
- Zombie in Love 2+1, illustrated by Scott Campbell, 2014 ISBN 978-1442459373
- Dog Days of School, illustrated by Brian Biggs, 2014 ISBN 978-0786854936
- Everyone Loves Bacon, illustrated by Eric Wight, Farrar, Straus, and Giroux books for Young Readers (New York, NY), 2015, ISBN 9780374300524
- Dragon Was Terrible, illustrated by Greg Pizzoli, Farrar, Straus, and Giroux books for Young Readers (New York, NY), 2016, ISBN 9780374300494
- Everyone Loves Cupcake, illustrated by Eric Wight, Farrar, Straus, and Giroux books for Young Readers (New York, NY), 2016, ISBN 9780374302931
- One Little Two Little Three Little Children, illustrated by Mary Lundquist, Balzer + Bray, 2016, ISBN 9780062348661
- Antoinette, illustrated by Christian Robinson, Atheneum Books for Young Readers (New York, NY), 2017, ISBN 9781481457835
- Super Manny Stands Up!, illustrated by Stephanie Graegin, Atheneum Books for Young Readers (New York, NY), 2017, ISBN 9781481459600
- Littles: And How They Grow, illustrated by A.G. Ford, Doubleday Books for Young Readers, 2017, ISBN 9780399555268
- Poe Won't Go, illustrated by Zachariah OHora, Disney-Hyperion (New York, NY), 2018 ISBN 9781484790595
- How to Grow Happiness: A Jerome the Gnome Adventure, illustrated by Matt Kaufenberg, Rodale Kids, 2018, ISBN 9781635651409
- We're Going on a Treasure Hunt, illustrated by Jay Fleck, Farrar, Straus, and Giroux books for Young Readers (New York, NY), 2019, ISBN 9780374306410
- Grace Goes to Washington, illustrated by LeUyen Pham, Disney-Hyperion (New York, NY), 2019, ISBN 9781368024334
