= Angeline Boulley =

Chippewa-American author (born 1966)

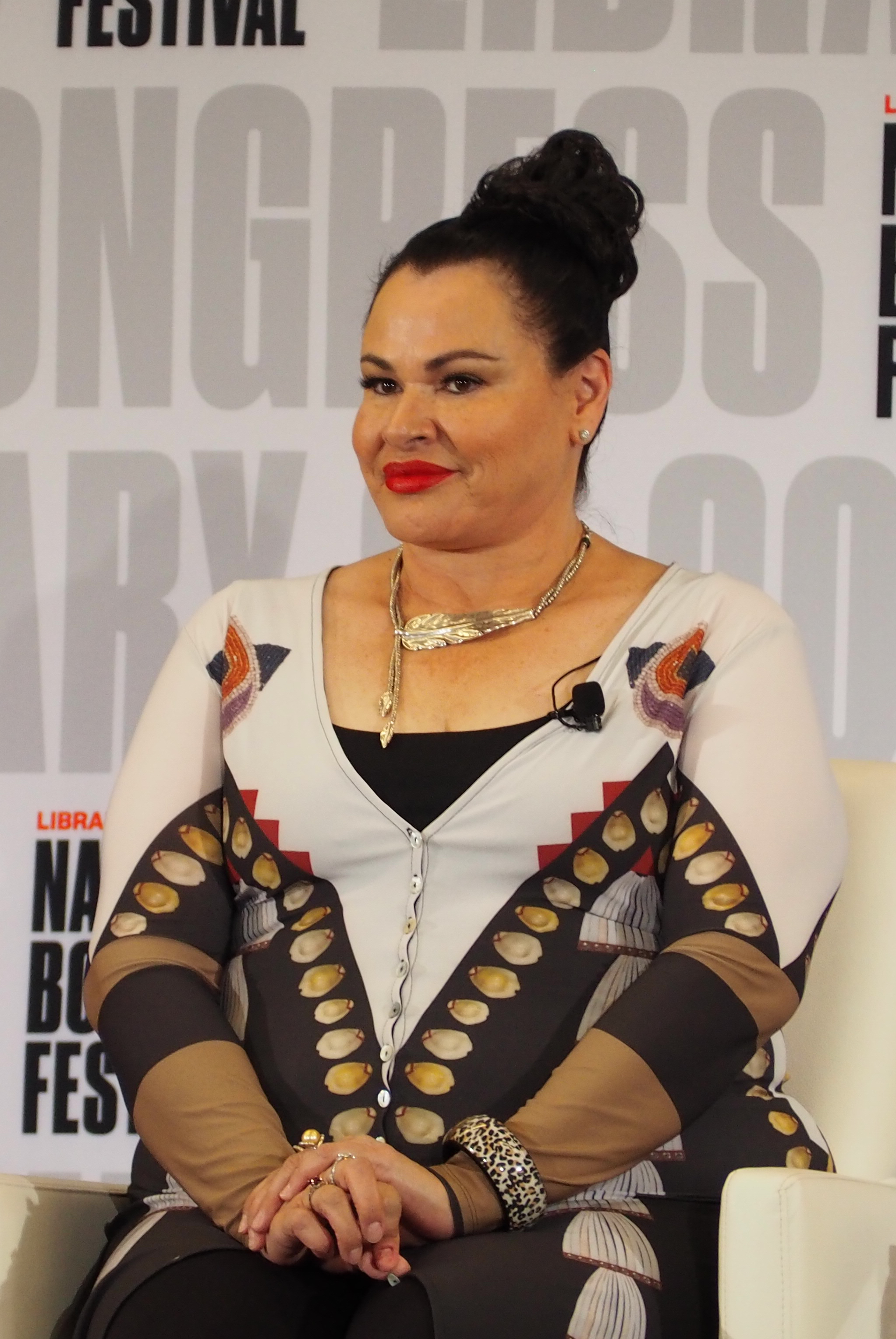
- Born: 1966 (age 59–60)
- Education: Central Michigan University
- Occupation: Writer
- Notable work: Firekeeper's Daughter

Angeline Boulley (born 1966) is a Native American (Ojibwe) author and has worked to improve education for Indigenous children. Her debut work, Firekeeper's Daughter, was named one of the top 100 young adult novels of all time by Time magazine. It was also a New York Times best seller and won the Edgar Allan Poe Award for Best Young Adult Novel in 2022. The novel will be adapted into a miniseries by Higher Ground.

== Personal life ==
Boulley is an enrolled member of the Sault Tribe of Chippewa Indians. She was born and raised in Bahweting (the place of the rapids) in Sault Ste. Marie, Michigan. Her "father is a traditional firekeeper, who strikes ceremonial fires at spiritual activities in the tribal community and ensures protocols are followed, while providing cultural teachings through stories told around the fire."

In high school, Boulley's first experience reading about a Native American character was Stranger with My Face. She was initially excited about the representation before becoming uncomfortable and disappointed due to the stereotypical portrayal.

Boulley is a graduate of Central Michigan University.

== Career ==
Boulley has worked in "Indian education at the tribal, state, and national levels." At the tribal level, she served as the Educational Director and Assistant Director. She also served on the Board of Regents at Bay Mills Community College before becoming the Director for the Office of Indian Education at the U.S. Department of Education.

At present, Boulley works as a full-time author.

== Firekeeper's Daughter ==
Boulley's debut novel, Firekeeper's Daughter, was published March 16, 2021, by Henry Holt and Co. The book is a New York Times best seller. Time magazine named it one of the best 100 young adult books of all time. In 2022, it won the Michael L. Printz Award for young adult literature, the Edgar Allan Poe Award for Best Young Adult Novel, the William C. Morris Award, and the American Indian Youth Literature Award Best Young Adult Honor. In the same year, it was named to the Bank Street Children's Book Committee's Best Books of the Year List with an "Outstanding Merit" distinction and shared the Committee's 2022 Josette Frank Award with Matt de la Peña and Christian Robinson's Milo Imagines the World. The German translation, which retains the English title and was published in 2022 by cbj, was nominated in March 2023 for the Deutscher Jugendliteraturpreis in the category "YA novel".

The novel is being adapted for television at Netflix by Higher Ground Productions, former President Barack Obama and Michelle Obama's production company.

Boulley's second novel, Warrior Girl Unearthed, was published in 2023 and is set in the same community of Sugar Island ten years later than Firekeeper's Daughter.

Boulley's third novel, Sisters in the Wind was published in 2025 and takes place in the same fictionalized world of her tribe and community as the first two novels.

== Bibliography ==
=== Novels ===
- Firekeeper's Daughter. New York City: Henry Holt and Co. 2021. ISBN 1250766567.
- Warrior Girl Unearthed. New York City: Henry Holt and Co. 2023. ISBN 1250766583.
- Sisters in the Wind. New York City: Henry Holt and Co. 2025. ISBN 1250328535.

== See also ==
- We Need Diverse Books
