= We Were Here (novel) =

2009 novel by Matt de la Pena

- Author: Matt de la Pena
- Language: English
- Genre: Drama, Crime
- Publisher: Random House Inc.
- Publication date: 5 October 2009
- Publication place: United States
- Media type: book
- Pages: 368 (Hardback)

We Were Here is a 2009 young adult novel by Matt de la Peña. It follows the story of Miguel, a teenager who rebels against the law. We Were Here was recognized as an ALA-YALSA Best Book for Young Adults, an ALA-SALSA Quick Pick for Reluctant Readers, and a Junior Library Guild Selection. It was also featured in the 2010 NYC Public Library Stuff for the Teenage list.

== Reception ==
We Were Here received mostly positive reviews. Publishers Weekly said it was "furiously paced" and described the book as "gripping" with "raw yet reflective journal entries." The journal also praised its "inverse authenticity." One reviewer, Hazel Rochman, noted the theme: "The riveting climax shows without heavy message that the hero's journey is a search for himself."
