= Last Stop on Market Street =

2015 children's book by Matt de la Peña

- Author: Matt de la Peña
- Illustrator: Christian Robinson
- Language: English
- Genre: Children's
- Publisher: Penguin Books
- Publication date: 2015
- Publication place: United States
- Pages: 32 pp

Last Stop on Market Street is a 2015 children's book written by American author Matt de la Peña and illustrated by Christian Robinson, which won the 2016 Newbery Medal, a Coretta Scott King Illustrator Honor, and a Caldecott Honor. Last Stop on Market Street's Newbery win was unprecedented, since it is rare for picture books to be awarded the medal. Last Stop on Market Street was met with widespread acclaim after its release, receiving positive reviews from Kirkus Reviews and the New York Times Book Review amongst many others.

The book follows a young boy named CJ as he learns to appreciate the beauty in everyday things during a bus ride. De la Peña and Robinson both drew on personal experiences when working together to create the book. Through its story and illustrations, Last Stop on Market Street tackles issues of race and class as they may be seen through the eyes of a young teen. In 2018, the children's book was adapted into a children's musical which has been performed by various children's theater groups across the country.

== Plot ==
This illustrated children’s book follows a young Black-American boy named CJ as he accompanies his grandmother, (nicknamed Nana) on the city bus to volunteer at a soup kitchen. The book begins with the pair exiting a church during a rainstorm. As they walk to a bus stop, CJ asks Nana why they have to walk in the rain, and Nana replies that trees, too, need water. When they arrive at the bus stop, CJ witnesses his friend, Colby, riding home in a car with his father and asks his Nana why they do not have a car. Later, the bus pulls up outside of them and CJ, along with his Nana, walks up to the front seat. After encountering a blind man and witnessing two boys with iPods a man plays a song on his guitar, causing CJ to finally feel true beauty. The book ends with CJ and Nana working at a soup kitchen.

== Background ==
De la Peña’s experiences growing up with a white mother and first generation Mexican American father in the border town of National City, California, informed his writing of this book. As a teenager, de la Peña realized how students were constantly grouped by their social class and race, creating a “forgotten group” of kids from marginalized backgrounds who were not expected or encouraged to succeed. He now strives to make these kids visible through his writing, as he was once one of them. De la Peña himself did not realize his love for reading until college, and during his Newbery Medal acceptance speech, described his desire to expose kids to “the magic of books at a younger age.” He pondered, “What if I can write a story that offers that tough, hoodied kid in the back of the auditorium a secret place to feel?”

Years before writing Last Stop on Market Street, de la Peña was first introduced to illustrator Christian Robinson's art and was immediately blown away. The piece that moved him the most was an illustration of a boy on a bus with his grandmother, which became the inspiration for Last Stop on Market Street. The story was extremely personal for both Robinson and de la Peña as they both had close relationships with their grandmothers and spent many years taking the bus. Robinson in particular took the bus with his grandmother throughout his childhood.

== Analysis ==
Last Stop on Market Street utilizes the picture book format to discuss the influence that race and class have in the lives of urban teens and their identity formation. Literary scholar Katherine Slater argues that, in Last Stop on Market Street, Black mobility is portrayed as an empowering force of resistance against marginalization. She explains how mobility is always influenced by the larger power structures at play, and in the United States, the movements of black people tend to be directed towards punitive ends. Slater particularly focuses on how the bus in Last Stop on Market Street represents mobility, first describing how it evokes the long history of civil rights activism that has involved busses. She asserts that de la Peña's use of metaphors and personification portray the bus as a space of possibility and flexibility instead of limitation. Additionally, she states that Robinson's illustrations of the bus utilize diagonal lines to symbolize mobility.

== Reception ==
Kirkus Reviews called Last Stop on Market Street "a textual and artistic tour de force." Writing for The New York Times Book Review, Newbery Medal-winning author Linda Sue Park wrote that, in addition to the revelation that CJ and Nana are on their way to a soup kitchen, "it's also the warmth of their intergenerational relationship that will make this book so satisfying, for both young readers and the adults sharing it with them." Thom Barthelmess wrote in Booklist that "The celebratory warmth is irresistible, offering a picture of community that resonates with harmony and diversity." Nell Beram wrote in The Horn Book Magazine, "This quietly remarkable book will likely inspire questions of a sort less practical-minded than CJ's; it will also have some adult readers reaching for a tissue." Writing for School Library Journal, Joy Fleishhacker said, "Poetic narration, radiant geometric-shaped artwork, and an authentic and enrichingly eye-opening representation of a diverse urban setting combine with out-and-out child appeal to make this tale a standout."

=== Awards ===
- Winner of the 2016 Newbery Medal
- A 2016 Caldecott Honor Book
- A 2016 Coretta Scott King Honor Book for the illustrator
- A 2016 Charlotte Zolotow Award Honor Book
- A 2016 Bank Street Children's Book Committee's Best Book of the Year with an "outstanding merit" distinction
- A New York Times Book Review Notable Children's Book of 2015
- A Wall Street Journal Best Children's Book of 2015

Amongst its many honors, Last Stop on Market Street was awarded the 2016 Newbery Medal, arguably the most highly regarded U.S. prize in children’s literature. This award marked a historic moment in the Newbery's history as Matt de la Peña became the first ever Hispanic American author to win the Medal. It also was regarded as a breakthrough moment for picture books, as Last Stop on Market Street became only the second-ever picture book to win the award, with the first being in 1982. Picture books typically do not win the Newbery Medal because the committee makes its decision for the recipient of the award primarily based on text. Prior to 2016 only nine of the 403 Newbery Medal and Honor titles were picture books, seven of them being Newbery honors and two winning the medal. The vivid descriptions in the book that make it possible to separate the images from the text is a likely contributor to Last Stop on Market Street being awarded the Newbery.

== Adaptations ==
Since its release, Last Stop on Market Street has been adapted to a children’s musical of the same name. Chicago Children’s Theatre and Minneapolis based Children’s Theatre Company co-commissioned the musical which first premiered in Chicago in the spring of 2018. Playwright Cheryl West adapted the book for the stage, further developing the characters and scenarios in de la Peña’s story while still adhering to its overarching themes. For example, in the musical CJ's character is a visitor in his Grandmother's town and is of Afro-Cuban descent. The music for the show was written by famous Motown songwriter Lamont Dozier, known for hits such as Marvin Gaye’s “How Sweet It Is,” who was joined by his composer son Paris Ray Dozier. When creating the musical's score, The Doziers incorporated elements of soul, which is Lamont’s area of expertise, with the Hip-Hop style more familiar to his son. The pair embraced the thematic change in CJ’s heritage by incorporating Cuban and Latin music into the show. The adaptation was well-received, even being called "Hamilton Jr." in reference to Lin-Manuel Miranda's Broadway musical, Hamilton. Rohan Preston of the Star Tribune wrote that the play was a success because the actors were "working with good material."

Since the musical’s creation, many other children’s theater groups across the country have added it to their programs such as Dallas Children’s theater and Minneapolis based Metro Theater Company. Rochester based theater group Theater Young Kids Enjoy opened their 17th season with the show, which ran for two weekends and featured an all-BIPOC cast. The musical adaptation of Last Stop on Market Street was also a part of Northwestern University’s pilot program for their Learn and Imagine Together Through Theater (LITT) partnership. LITT is a partnership between Northwestern, Evanston School district 65, and the Imagine U theater company aimed to advance racial equity through theater. In fall of 2021 the Imagine U production of the show was streamed to 45 classrooms of fourth graders in district 65, followed by a 45 minute drama lesson.

Awards
Preceded by The Crossover	Newbery Medal recipient 2016	Succeeded by The Girl Who Drank the Moon
