= The Bench (book) =

2021 picture book for children

- First edition
- Authors: Meghan Markle
- Illustrator: Christian Robinson
- Language: English
- Genre: Children's literature
- Publisher: Random House Children's Books
- Publication date: June 8, 2021
- Media type: Print

The Bench is a 2021 picture book for children written by Meghan, Duchess of Sussex. It was published on June 8, 2021 by Random House Children's Books. Meghan has also narrated the audiobook of the story.

The book is illustrated by Christian Robinson; it features Robinson's first illustrations in watercolour.

== Background ==
The genesis for the book came from a poem that Meghan wrote for her husband, Prince Harry, Duke of Sussex, for Father's Day. Meghan found inspiration for the book from the relationship that Harry has with their son, Archie Mountbatten-Windsor. Following its release, Meghan, alongside Archewell, donated 2,000 copies of The Bench to libraries, schools, and other nonprofit programs across the United States.

== Synopsis ==
The book is about the relationship between a father and his son told from the perspective of the mother. Random House Children's Books said in a press release that the book "touchingly captures the evolving and expanding relationship between fathers and sons and reminds us of the many ways that love can take shape and be expressed in a modern family". Meghan described Robinson's "beautiful and ethereal" illustrations as capturing "the warmth, joy, and comfort of the relationship between fathers and sons from all walks of life" and that she and Robinson "worked closely to depict this special bond through an inclusive lens".

== Reception ==
Alex O'Connell of The Times praised The Bench for its illustrations but stated it lacked "a good story and basic rhythm" and remarked its readability targeted "needy" parents rather than young children. Sarah Dawson of The Independent dubbed it a "sweet, calming bedtime read" that was "unlikely to win any literary awards" and also noted its appeal to adults rather than children. Writing for The Telegraph, Claire Allfree found The Bench a "series of imperatives disguised as loving verse", and criticized its grammar and "generic" storyline. Emily Phillips from the Evening Standard gave plaudits for the book's "soft rhymes and gentle watercolours", and praised its relatability to diverse families. Rosita Boland for The Irish Times praised Robinson's watercolor depictions as "lovely" but labelled the Duchess's writing "extremely disjointed". Writing for The New York Times, Sarah Lyall complimented the book's messaging and illustrations but labelled the rhyming "tortured" and dubbed the writing "not terrible, but it's not terrific."

On June 9, the book reached number three on Amazon's American bestseller list and was number one in the Children's Emotions books category. On June 17, the book reached number one in the children's picture books category of The New York Times Best Seller list.
