= Christian Robinson =

American illustrator of children's books and an animator

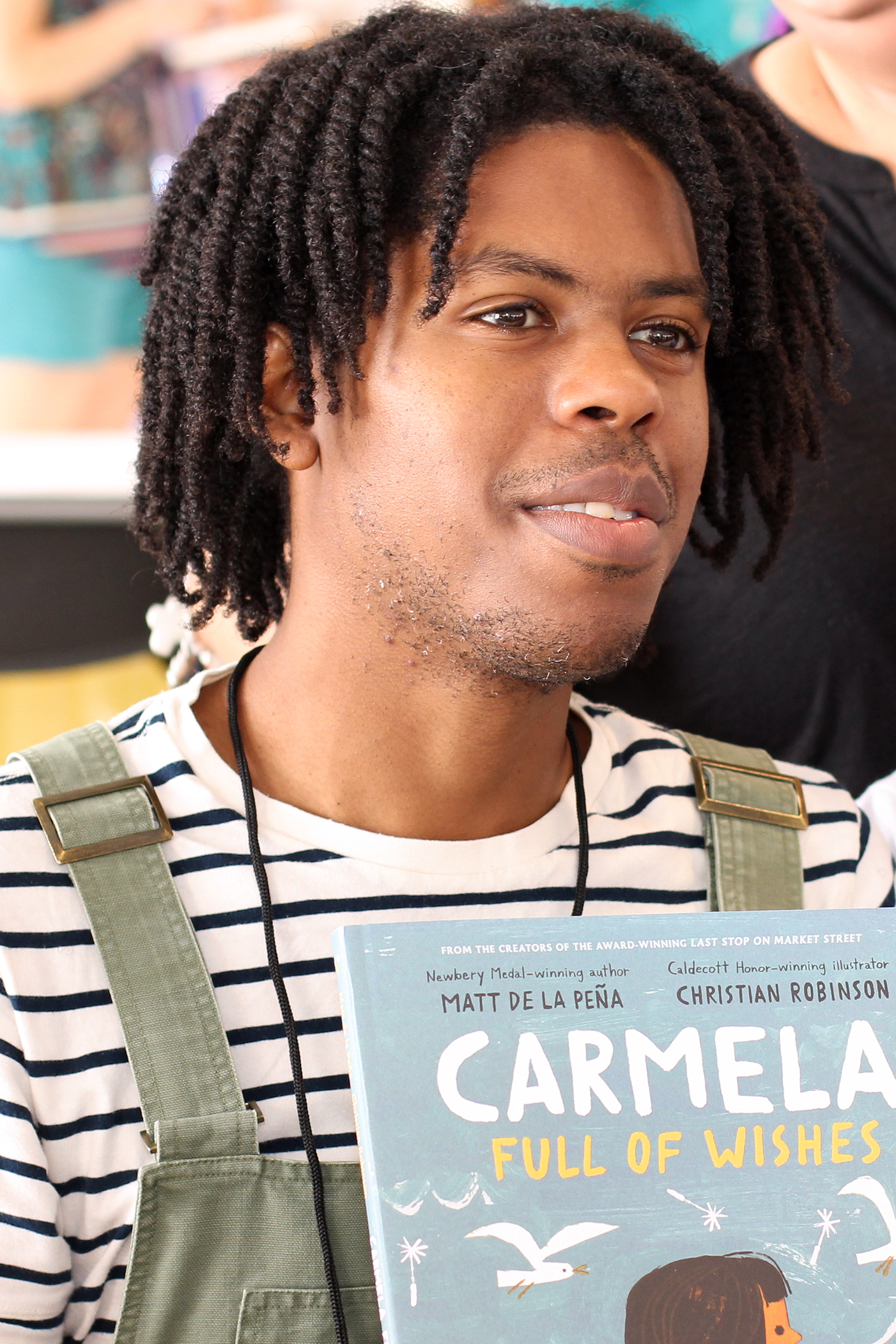
- Robinson at the 2018 Texas Book Festival
- Occupation: Illustrator
- Writing career
- Genre: Children's picture books
- Notable work: Last Stop on Market Street
- Notable awards: Caldecott Honor; 2016; Coretta Scott King Illustrator Honor; 2016

Christian Robinson (born August 2, 1986) is an American illustrator of children's books and an animator. He is based in Sacramento, California and has worked with The Sesame Street Workshop and Pixar Animation Studios. He graduated from the California Institute of the Arts.

== Personal life ==
Robinson grew up in Los Angeles, California, raised by his grandmother in a one-bedroom home shared by six people. He began his career in animation until a mentor, Ben Butcher, inspired his shift toward children's books. He lived for seven years in San Francisco before relocating to Sacramento.

== Awards ==
Robinson was awarded a Coretta Scott King Illustrator Honor and a Caldecott Honor for Last Stop on Market Street. The book also won the 2016 Newbery Medal, for author Matt de la Peña who said of his process, "I know editors often want to keep writers and illustrators apart, but I feel this story really benefited from the fact that I knew Christian was going to be the illustrator. I printed out his piece with the boy on the bus with his grandma and had it next to me as I wrote the story. That piece set the tone, I think. I just followed it into the story." Last Stop on Market Street was also named to the Bank Street Children's Book Committee's Best Books of the Year List with an "Outstanding Merit" distinction.

In 2021, he published, alongside Matt de la Peña, Milo Imagines the World. His "colorful collage" art helped the book become a 2022 Bank Street Children's Best Books of the Year List with an “Outstanding Merit” distinction and shared the Committee’s Josette Frank Award with Angeline Boulley's Firekeeper's Daughter.

Robinson provided "colorful bold line drawings" to Renée Watson's 2012 picture book Harlem's Little Blackbird, which earned a spot on the 2013 Bank Street Children's Book Committee's Best Books of the Year List.

He was the winner of the 2014 Ezra Jack Keats New Illustrator Award for Rain! authored by Linda Ashman The book was also a 2014 Bank Street Children's Book Committee's Best Books of the Year and Robinson was noted for his "gentle paint and watercolor illustrations."

He was also awarded the Coretta Scott King Illustrator Honor for Josephine in 2015.

Gaston was selected in 2015 for an IRA Teachers' Choices Reading List award. and was also selected as a 2015 Notable Children's Book for younger readers by the Association for Library Service to Children.

He was the illustrator for Mac Barnett's 2015 picture book, Leo: A Ghost Story. His "moody blue illustrations" helped the book become a 2016 Bank Street Children's Book Committee's Best Books of the Year.

Robinson provided "folk-art style paintings" for Margaret Wise Brown's reissued (2016) The Dead Bird, which received an "Outstanding Merit" distinction on the 2017 Bank Street Children's Book Committee's Best Books of the Year List. He was the illustrator for Cynthia Rylant's 2016 picture book, Little Penguins which was also the 2017 Bank Street Children's Book Committee's Best Books of the Year List.

In 2018, his "evocative mixed-media illustrations" appeared in Matt de la Peña's Carmela Full of Wishes which appeared on the 2019 Bank Street Children's Book Committee's Best Books of the Year List.

He provided the "stylized paint and collage illustrations" for Julie Fogliano's 2019 Just in Case You Want to Fly which was a 2020 Bank Street Children's Book Committee's Best Books of the Year with an "Outstanding Merit" distinction.

His 2019 picture book, Another was also a 2020 Bank Street Children's Book Committee's Best Books of the Year and also received an "Outstanding Merit" distinction.

== Selected works ==
- Harlem's Little Blackbird by Renée Watson (2012)
- Rain! by Linda Ashman (2013)
- Josephine by Patricia Hruby Powell (2013)
- Gaston by Kelly DiPucchio (2014)
- The Smallest Girl in the Smallest Grade by Justin Roberts (2014)
- Last Stop on Market Street by Matt de la Peña (2015)
- Leo: A Ghost Story by Mac Barnett (2015)
- The Dead Bird by Margaret Wise Brown reissued in (2016)
- School's First Day of School by Adam Rex (2016)
- Little Penguins by Cynthia Rylant (2016)
- Antoinette by Kelly DiPucchio (2017)
- When's My Birthday? by Julie Fogliano (2017)
- Carmela Full of Wishes by Matt de la Peña (2018)
- Another by Christian Robinson (2019)
- Just in Case You Want to Fly by Julie Fogliano (2019)
- He illustrated the jacket for Sunny Day: A Celebration of the Sesame Street Theme Song (2019)
- The Bench by Meghan, Duchess of Sussex (2021)
- Milo Imagines the World by Matt de la Peña (2021)
- Something, Someday by Amanda Gorman (2023)
