= Meghan, Duchess of Sussex =

American member of the British royal family (born 1981)

Meghan
- Duchess of Sussex (more)
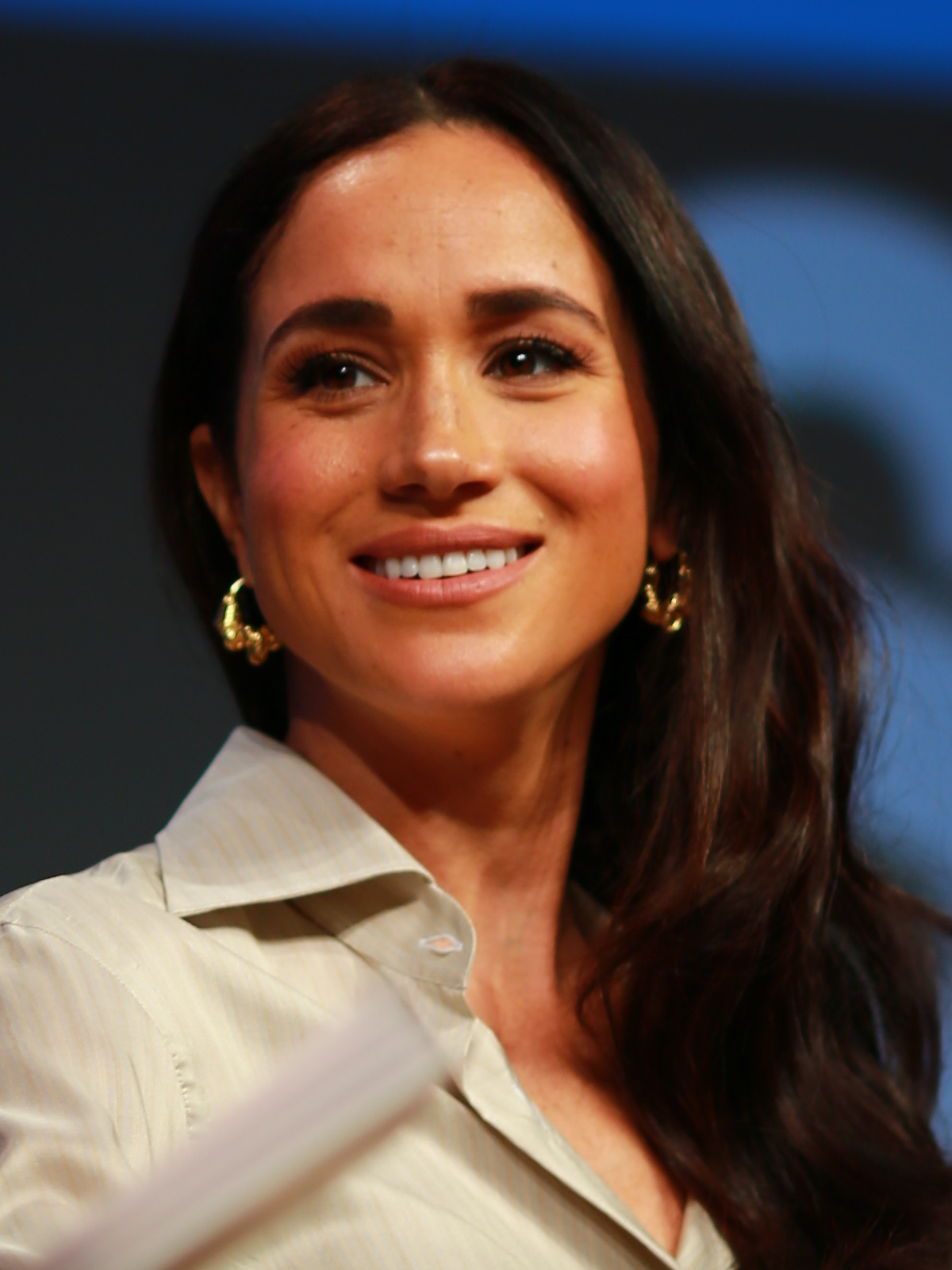
- Meghan in 2024
- Born: Rachel Meghan Markle; August 4, 1981 (age 45); Los Angeles, California, US
- Spouses: Trevor Engelson (m. 2011; div. 2014); Prince Harry, Duke of Sussex (m. 2018)
- Issue: Prince Archie of Sussex; Princess Lilibet of Sussex
- House: Windsor (by marriage)
- Father: Thomas Markle Sr.
- Mother: Doria Ragland
- Education: Northwestern University (BA)
- Occupation: Actress
- Years active: 2001–2017; 2025

Meghan, Duchess of Sussex (Note: Pronunciation of "Meghan": /ˈmɛɡən/) (born Rachel Meghan Markle, August 4, 1981), is an American member of the British royal family, media personality, entrepreneur, and actress. She is married to Prince Harry, Duke of Sussex, the younger son of King Charles III.

Meghan was born and raised in Los Angeles, California. Her acting career began at Northwestern University. She played the part of Rachel Zane for seven seasons (2011–2018) in the legal drama series Suits. She also developed a social media presence, which included The Tig (2014–2017), a lifestyle blog. During The Tig period, Meghan became involved in charity work focused primarily on women's issues and social justice. She was married to the film producer Trevor Engelson from 2011 until their divorce in 2014.

Meghan married Prince Harry in 2018 and became known as the Duchess of Sussex. They have two children: Archie and Lilibet. The couple stepped down as working royals in January 2020, moved to Meghan's native Southern California and launched Archewell Inc., a Beverly Hills-based mix of for-profit and not-for-profit (charitable) business organizations. In March 2021, she and her husband participated in Oprah with Meghan and Harry, a much-publicized American television interview by Oprah Winfrey. She has written the children's book The Bench, hosted a podcast Archetypes (2022), and has appeared in the Netflix series Harry & Meghan (2022) and With Love, Meghan (2025). Her lifestyle and cooking brand, As Ever, was officially launched in April 2025. In August 2026, she and Harry relocated back to the UK with their children, without plans to resume public duties as working members of the royal family.

== Early life and education ==
Rachel Meghan Markle was born on August 4, 1981, in Los Angeles, California. She identifies as mixed race, stating, "My dad is Caucasian and my mom is African American. I'm half black and half white." Her parents, former makeup artist Doria Ragland and retired television lighting and photography director Thomas Markle Sr., separated when she was two and divorced four years later.

Meghan reportedly has a close relationship with her mother. Until the age of nine, both parents contributed to raising her; afterward, her father became her primary caregiver while her mother pursued her career, and Markle lived with him full‑time before starting university at age 18. Markle Sr. worked as a director of photography and lighting for General Hospital and Married... with Children, and she occasionally visited the set of Married... with Children as a child. In later life, she became estranged from her father and her paternal half-siblings, Samantha Markle and Thomas Markle Jr.

Growing up in the View Park–Windsor Hills neighborhood of Los Angeles, Markle attended Hollywood Little Red Schoolhouse. At age 11, she and her classmates wrote to Procter & Gamble urging the company to gender-neutralize a dishwashing-soap commercial on national television. She was raised Christian, though conflicting reports indicate she was raised either Catholic or Protestant. She graduated from Immaculate Heart High School (Los Angeles), a fee-charging all-girls Catholic school. Markle took part in plays and musicals at the school, where her father assisted with lighting. During her teenage years, she worked at a local frozen-yogurt shop and a donut shop, and later as a nanny and waitress. She also volunteered at a soup kitchen in Skid Row, Los Angeles.

In 1999, she was admitted to Northwestern University (NU) in Evanston, Illinois, where she joined the Kappa Kappa Gamma sorority. With other members of the sorority, Markle volunteered with the Glass Slipper Project. After her junior year, her uncle Michael Markle helped secure her an internship as a junior press officer at the American embassy in Buenos Aires, and she briefly considered a political career. However, she did not score high enough on the Foreign Service Officer test to proceed further with the US State Department and returned to NU. She also attended a study-abroad program in Madrid. In 2003, Markle earned her bachelor's degree with a double major in theater and international studies from Northwestern's School of Communication.

== Acting career ==
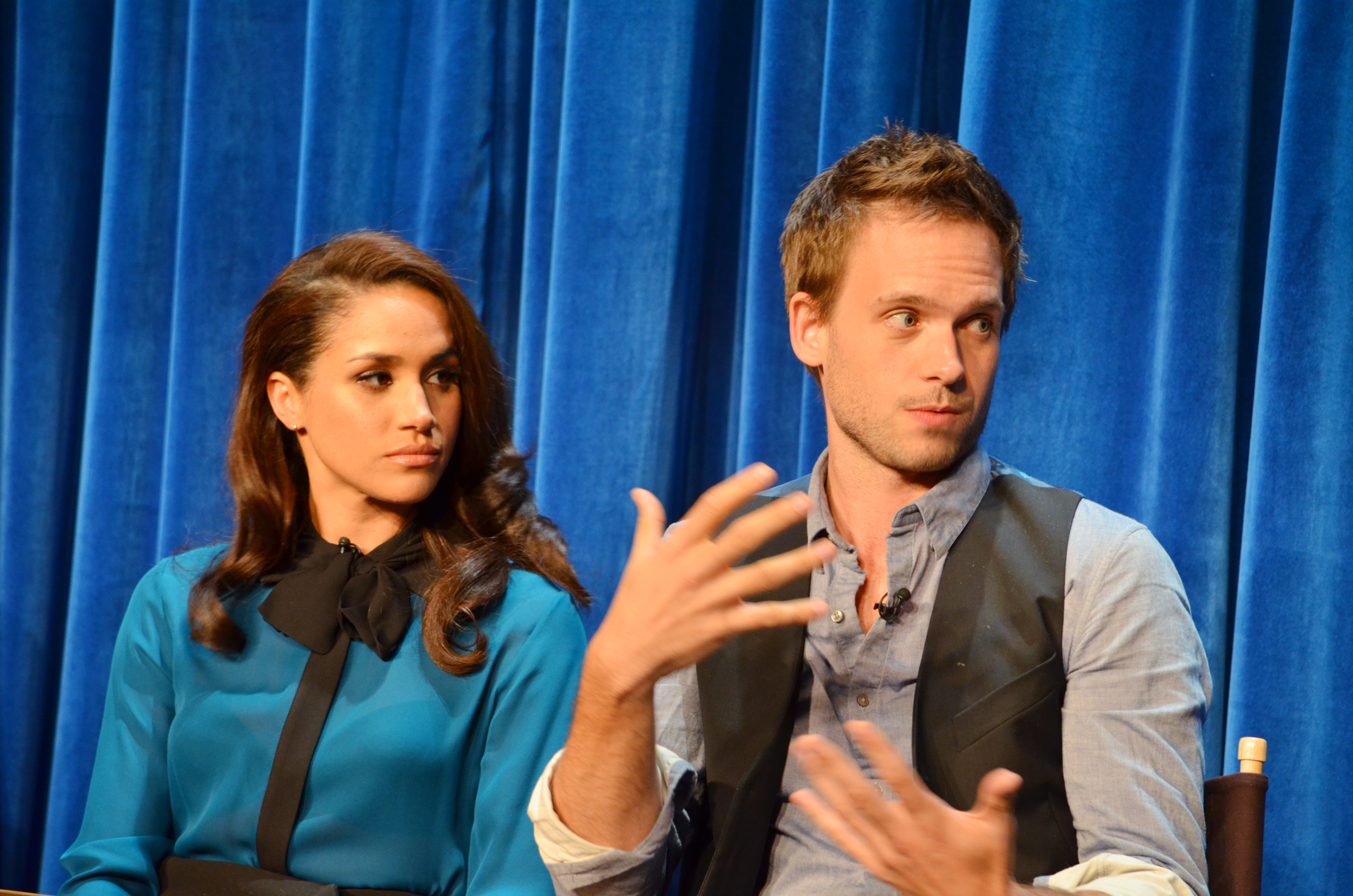
Markle and her Suits co-star Patrick J. Adams at Paley Center for Media, 2013

According to Markle, she had difficulty securing roles early in her career because she was "ethnically ambiguous", explaining, "I wasn't black enough for the black roles and I wasn't white enough for the white ones." To support herself between acting jobs, she worked as a freelance calligrapher and taught bookbinding. Her first on-screen appearance was a small role as a nurse in an episode of the daytime soap opera General Hospital, a show for which her father served as a lighting director. Markle had small guest roles on the television shows Century City (2004), The War at Home (2006), and CSI: NY (2006). For her role in Century City, she told the casting directors she was a SAG-AFTRA member when she was not; after she was cast, the employers were required to help her join the union under the Taft–Hartley Act. Markle also did several contract acting and modeling jobs. Between 2006 and 2007, she worked as a "briefcase girl" on 34 episodes of the US version of the game show Deal or No Deal. She appeared in Fox's series Fringe as Junior Agent Amy Jessup in the first two episodes of its second season.

Markle appeared in small roles in the films Get Him to the Greek (2010), Remember Me (2010) (produced by her then-partner Trevor Engelson), The Candidate (2010), and in the film Horrible Bosses (2011). She was paid $187,000 for her role in Remember Me and $171,429 for her role in the short film The Candidate. In July 2011, she joined the cast of the USA Network series Suits through to late 2017 and the seventh season. Her character, Rachel Zane, began as a paralegal and eventually became an attorney. While working on Suits, she lived for nine months each year in Toronto. She was reportedly paid either $50,000 per episode or $450,000 per year for her work on the series.

Markle appeared in the 2015 British crime film Anti-Social, which was edited and released again in 2016, to give her role more prominence after she began dating Prince Harry. She made her acting return in November 2025, being cast in Close Personal Friends.

== Personal life ==
=== Early relationships and first marriage ===
Markle and American film producer Trevor Engelson began dating in 2004. They were married in Ocho Rios, Jamaica, on August 16, 2011. They separated in 2013 and were granted a divorce in 2014. Markle's subsequent live-in relationship with Canadian celebrity chef and restaurateur Cory Vitiello ended in May 2016 after almost two years.

=== Second marriage and motherhood ===
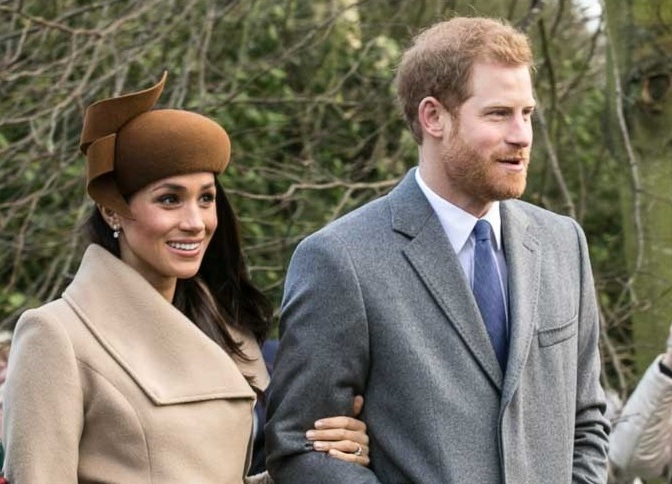
With Harry on Christmas Day 2017

In mid-2016, Markle began a relationship with Prince Harry, a grandson of Queen Elizabeth II. According to the couple, they first connected with each other via Instagram, and they have also said that they were set up on a blind date by a mutual friend in July 2016. On November 8, eight days after the relationship was made public by the press, Harry directed his communications secretary to release a statement on his behalf expressing personal concern about pejorative and false comments made about his girlfriend by mainstream media and internet trolls. Later, in a letter to a British media regulator, Markle's representatives complained about harassment from journalists. In September 2017, Markle and Harry appeared together in public in Toronto at the Invictus Games, of which Harry is the founding patron.

Markle's engagement to Harry was announced on November 27, 2017, by his father Charles (then the Prince of Wales). The announcement was greeted with enthusiasm by the British media and prompted generally positive commentary about a mixed-race person joining the royal family, particularly in Commonwealth countries. Markle announced that she would retire from acting and her intention to become a British citizen.

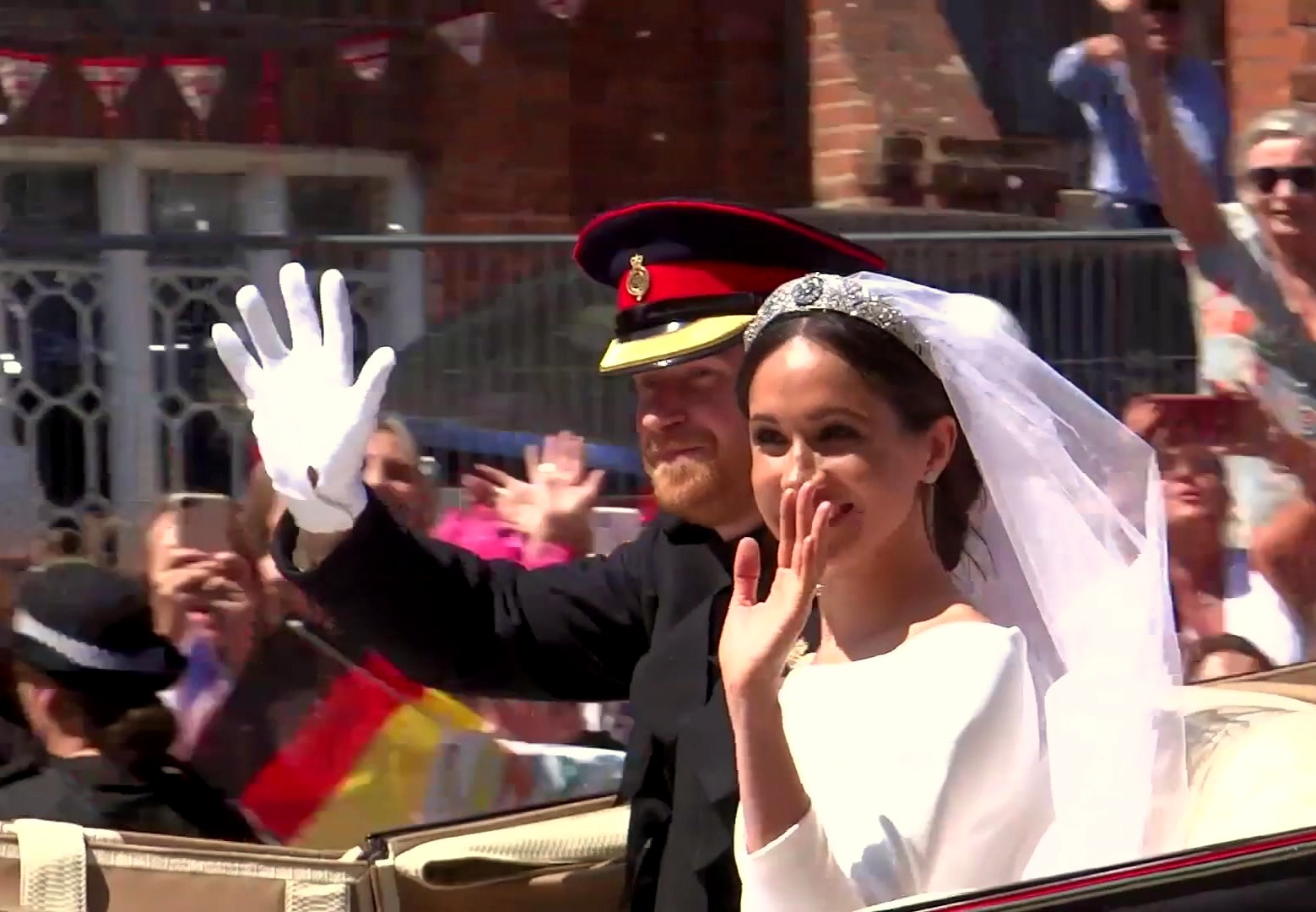
Carriage procession through streets of Windsor, May 2018

In preparation for the wedding, the Archbishop of Canterbury, Justin Welby, baptized Markle and confirmed her in the Church of England on March 6, 2018, in a private ceremony conducted with water from the River Jordan in the Chapel Royal at St James's Palace. On the morning of the wedding, Queen Elizabeth II conferred the title of Duke of Sussex upon Harry; Markle became Duchess of Sussex through her marriage to him later that day. The marriage ceremony was held on May 19 at St George's Chapel, Windsor Castle. Her wedding dress was designed by Clare Waight Keller. Meghan later revealed that there had been a private exchange of vows three days earlier with the Archbishop of Canterbury in the couple's garden, although this exchange was not a legally recognized marriage.

After the wedding, Meghan and Harry lived at Nottingham Cottage in London, on the grounds of Kensington Palace. In May 2018, it was reported that they had signed a two-year lease on Westfield Large, located on the Great Tew Estate in the Cotswolds. They gave up the lease after photos of the house and its interior were published by a paparazzi agency. The couple considered settling in the twenty-one room Apartment 1 within Kensington Palace, but instead moved to Frogmore Cottage in the Home Park of Windsor Castle instead. The Crown Estate refurbished the cottage at a cost of £2.4 million, paid out of the Sovereign Grant, with Harry later reimbursing expenses beyond restoration and ordinary maintenance, a portion of which was offset against rental payments due at the time.

Meghan gave birth to a son, Archie, on May 6, 2019. Meghan and Harry's office moved to Buckingham Palace and officially closed on March 31, 2020, when they withdrew from undertaking official royal engagements. After some months in Canada and the United States, the couple bought a house in June 2020 on the former estate of Riven Rock, Montecito, California. The next month, Meghan suffered a miscarriage. She gave birth to a daughter, Lilibet, on June 4, 2021. Meghan later revealed that she had suffered from postpartum preeclampsia. In 2024, the couple reportedly acquired a property in Portugal, understood to be in the Melides area of the Alentejo coast, while retaining their home in Montecito. In August 2026, the couple relocated to the UK for an extended period and established a private residence outside London, while retaining their properties in California and Portugal.

Meghan and Harry have owned a Labrador named Pula and two Beagles named Guy and Mamma Mia. She previously owned a Labrador-German Shepherd cross named Bogart.

=== Political views ===
Markle was politically vocal before marrying Harry. At age 9, she and her friends reportedly campaigned against the Gulf War. Decades later, she supported Hillary Clinton during the 2016 United States presidential election and publicly criticized Clinton's opponent and eventual winner, Donald Trump. In the same year, after the referendum on the United Kingdom's membership in the European Union resulted in a vote in favor of Brexit, Markle expressed her disappointment on Instagram. In 2017, she recommended the book Who Rules the World? by left-wing intellectual Noam Chomsky on her Instagram account.

In July 2018, Irish senator Catherine Noone tweeted that the Duchess was "pleased to see the result" of the Irish referendum on legalizing abortion. Meghan received criticism for potentially breaching the protocol that prohibits members of the royal family from engaging in political activity. Noone later deleted the tweet and stated that her wording had been misleading and that "the Duchess was not in any way political".

After she returned to the United States and as an eligible voter, Meghan released a video with her husband encouraging others to register for the 2020 United States presidential election on National Voter Registration Day. Some media outlets interpreted the message as an implicit endorsement of the Democratic candidate, Joe Biden, which prompted then‑president Trump to dismiss their remarks at a press conference. In October 2021, she penned an open letter to Senate Majority Leader Chuck Schumer and House Speaker Nancy Pelosi advocating for paid parental leave. Her remarks were met with backlash from Republican representatives Jason Smith and Lisa McClain, who described her statement as "out of touch" and criticized her involvement in American politics while utilizing her British royal titles. Meghan has reportedly lobbied senators from both parties on the issue of paid family leave, including Democratic senators Patty Murray and Kirsten Gillibrand, as well as Republican senators Shelley Moore Capito and Susan Collins. She has also publicly spoken in support of federal voting protections.

In February 2022, she voiced her support for the Supreme Court nomination of Ketanji Brown Jackson. In June 2022, she publicly supported Moms Demand Action, an organization that campaigns for safer gun laws in the US. In the same month, in an interview with Jessica Yellin for Vogue, Meghan criticized the Supreme Court's decision that abortion is not a constitutionally protected right and voiced her support for the proposed Equal Rights Amendment.

== Public life ==
=== Royal duties ===
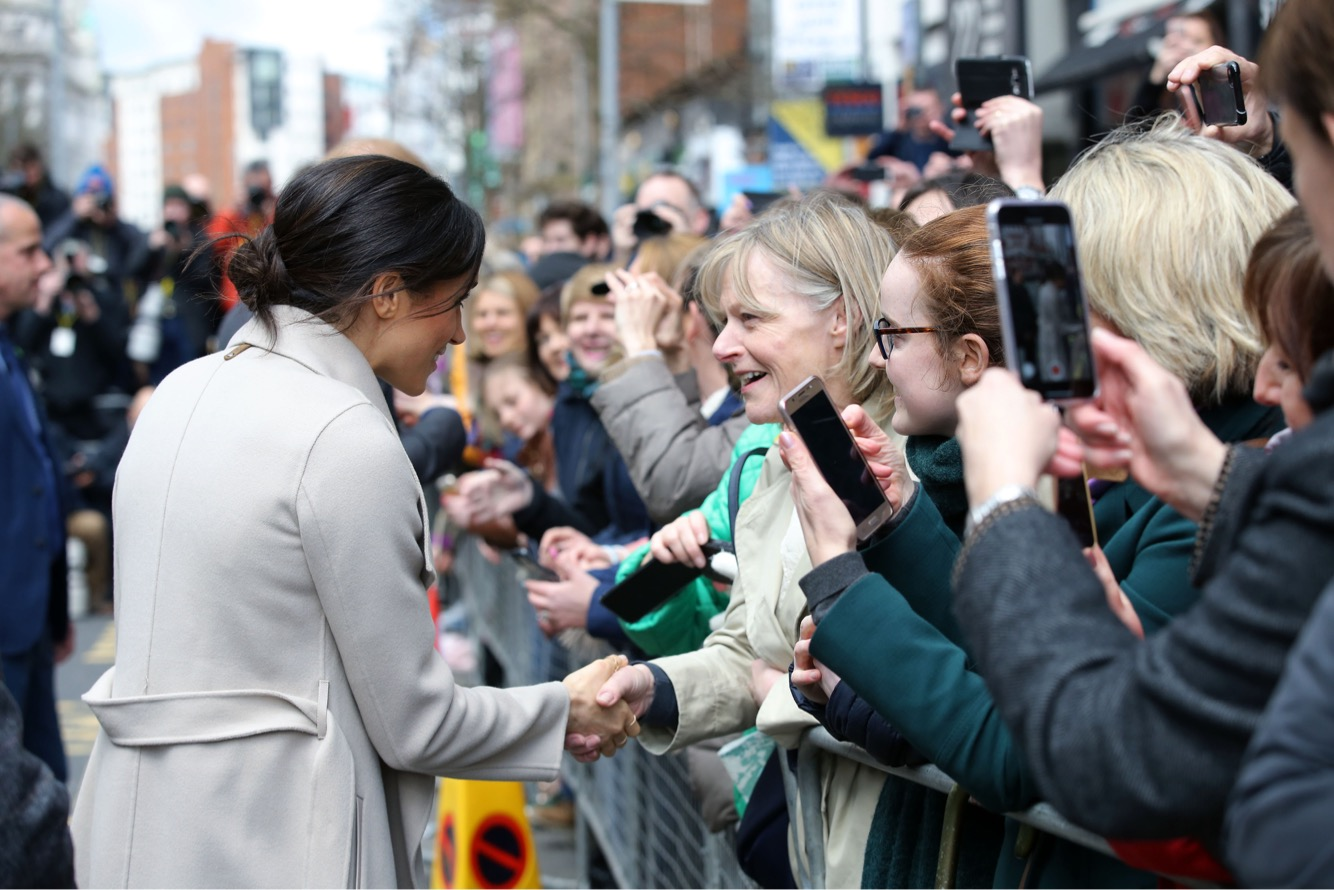
Meghan greeting the public in Belfast, March 2018

After becoming engaged, Markle's first official public appearance with Harry was at a World AIDS Day walkabout in Nottingham on December 1, 2017. On March 12, 2018, the Commonwealth Day service at Westminster Abbey was the first royal event she attended with the Queen. On March 23, Harry and Meghan made an unannounced day visit to Northern Ireland. In total, Markle attended 26 public engagements prior to the wedding. Meghan's first official engagement after marriage was on May 22, when she and her husband attended a garden party celebrating the charity work of King Charles III (then the Prince of Wales).

In July 2018, Meghan's first official trip abroad as a royal was to Dublin, Ireland, alongside Harry. In October 2018, the Duke and Duchess traveled to Sydney for the 2018 Invictus Games. This formed part of a Pacific tour that included Australia, Fiji, Tonga and New Zealand. As representatives of the Queen, the couple were greeted warmly by crowds in Sydney, and the announcement of Meghan's pregnancy hours after their arrival delighted the public and media. During their visit to Morocco in February 2019, the Duke and Duchess focused on projects centered on "women's empowerment, girls' education, inclusivity and encouragement of social entrepreneurship". Meghan also participated in her husband's work as youth ambassador to the Commonwealth, which included overseas tours.

As part of establishing a separate office from that of the Duke and Duchess of Cambridge in 2019, the Duke and Duchess created an Instagram social media account, which broke the record for the fastest account at the time to reach a million followers. In July 2019, the Duchess's security team were criticized for creating an empty zone of about 40 seats around her at Wimbledon where she was watching a match between Serena Williams and Kaja Juvan. In August 2019, Meghan and her husband were criticized by environmental campaigners for using private jets regularly when taking their personal trips abroad, which would leave more carbon footprint per person compared to commercial planes. The criticism was in line with similar criticism faced by the royal family in June 2019, after it was claimed that they had doubled their carbon footprint from business travel.

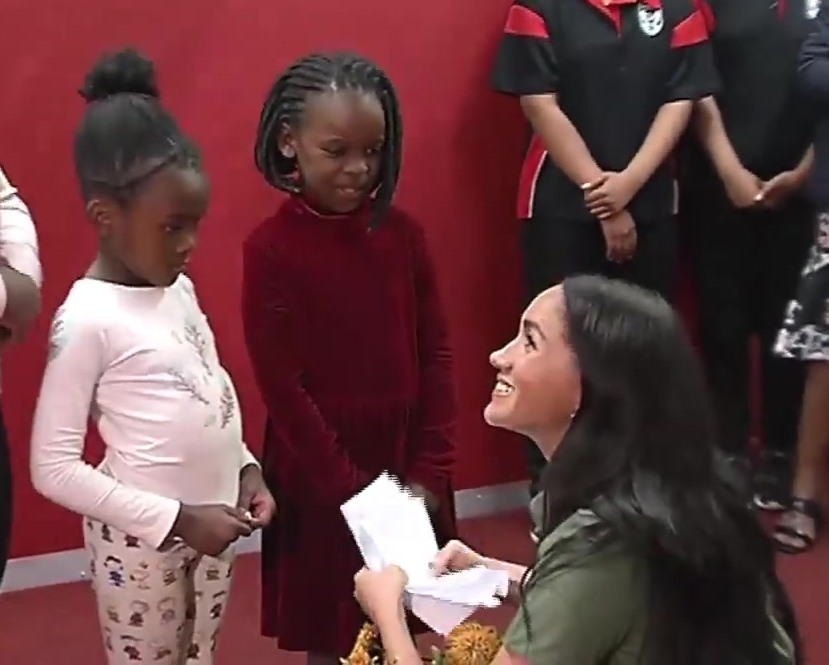
At ActionAid in South Africa, 2019

In September and October 2019, a Southern African tour included Malawi, Angola, South Africa and Botswana. Archie traveled with his parents, making it "their first official tour as a family". Meghan completed 179 engagements in total in 2018 and 2019.

=== Stepping back and subsequent public appearances ===
In January 2020, Meghan and Harry returned to the UK from a vacation in Canada and announced that they were stepping back from their roles as senior members of the royal family and would balance their time between the United Kingdom and North America. A statement released by the Palace confirmed that the Duke and Duchess were to cease to undertaking royal duties as representatives of the Queen and would therefore no longer receive the relevant financial support. The couple would retain their HRH styles but not use them. The formal role of the Duke and Duchess was subject to a twelve-month review period, ending in March 2021. Meghan's final public solo engagement as a senior royal was a visit to Robert Clack School in Dagenham on March 7, 2020, ahead of International Women's Day. She and Harry attended the Commonwealth Day service at Westminster Abbey on March 9, 2020, which was their last engagement as a couple before they officially stepped down on March 31. They made their first official appearance in the UK since then in June 2022 while attending the Platinum Jubilee National Service of Thanksgiving.

They visited the UK and Germany in September 2022 for a number of charity events in Manchester and Düsseldorf. On September 8, 2022, while Meghan and Harry were in London preparing to attend a charity event, Queen Elizabeth II died at Balmoral Castle in Scotland, and they remained in the United Kingdom for her funeral.

Meghan and Harry visited Nigeria in May 2024 to honor the work of the Invictus Games. Meghan had previously stated that a genetic test had found she was of 43% Nigerian ancestry. According to CNN, their trip focused on "sports rehabilitation, mental health, and women's empowerment". Meghan co-hosted a women's empowerment summit with the head of the World Trade Organization, Ngozi Okonjo-Iweala, and she was honored in a ceremony by some of the Nigerian Chiefs. Subsequent trips included a visit to Colombia in August 2024 at the invitation of the country's vice-president, Francia Márquez, and a visit to Jordan in February 2026 with the Director-General of the World Health Organization (WHO) Tedros Adhanom Ghebreyesus. For either trips, the couple was accompanied by one selected reporter. The visit to Colombia cost Col$244,245,305 (approximately £44,419) in public funds, covering official expenses such as internal transportation, security, and advance logistical planning, while the couple paid for their own international flights, accommodation in Bogotá, and personal expenses. In April 2026, Meghan and Harry undertook a four‑day visit to Australia. A petition on Change.org calling for the couple not to receive taxpayer-funded security during the trip gained more than 45,000 signatures, prompting their team to state that the visit would be funded privately. Australian police later announced that they would be conducting an operation to ensure safety during parts of the couple's tour. In the following month, Meghan attended the inauguration of the Lost Screen Memorial in Geneva alongside Adhanom Ghebreyesus as part of the No Child Lost to Social Media campaign and ahead of the 79th World Health Assembly. In July 2026, she and her children joined her husband on a visit to the UK, where they privately met with her father-in-law, King Charles III, and Queen Camilla. In the following month, the family relocated to the UK for an "extended period", with Archie and Lilibet enrolled to begin school there in September. It was reported that the family would reside at a private, non-royal property, while Meghan and Harry would remain non-working members of the royal family and would not resume official royal duties. In October 2026, the couple made their first joint appearance in the UK since their relocation, attending a series of engagements in Nottingham.

== Further career and investments ==
In summer 2019, before announcing their decision to step down in January 2020, Meghan and her husband were involved in talks with Jeffrey Katzenberg, the founder of the now-defunct streaming platform Quibi, over a possible role in the service without gaining personal profits, but they eventually decided against joining the project. In September 2019, it was reported that the couple had hired New York-based PR firm Sunshine Sachs, which had been working with them on intermittent projects since 2017. The firm represented them until 2022 before being rehired by them in 2026. The couple has also been associated with Adam Lilling's Plus Capital, a venture capital fund designed to connect early stage companies with influencers and investors.

In June 2020, they signed with the Harry Walker Agency, owned by media company Endeavor, to conduct paid public speaking engagements. In September 2020, the Sussexes signed a five-year private commercial deal with Netflix. In December 2020, it was announced that Meghan had invested in Clevr Blends, a coffee company based in Southern California. In the same month, Meghan and Harry signed a multi-year deal with Spotify to produce and host their own programs through their audio producing company, Archewell Audio. A holiday special was released by the couple on the service in December 2020, while Meghan's podcast, titled Archetypes, premiered in August 2022. In June 2023, Spotify cancelled the podcast, which ran for a single season of 12 episodes.

The Bench, a picture book written by Meghan with illustrations by Christian Robinson, was published in June 2021 by Random House Children's Books. It is based on her perception of the relationship between her husband and their son. The book received a mixed response; it garnered praise for its illustrations and messaging but was criticized for its structure and writing. On June 17, the book reached number one in the children's picture books category of The New York Times Best Seller list. In July 2021, it was announced that Meghan would executive produce, alongside David Furnish, a Netflix animated series called Pearl. The series was originally pitched to Netflix in 2018. Pearl would have depicted the adventures of a 12-year-old girl who was inspired by influential women from history, but the project was canceled in May 2022. Also in July 2021, it was reported that Meghan and Harry had signed a four-book publishing deal with Random House, including a wellness guide by Meghan and a memoir by Harry.

In October 2021, Meghan and Harry announced their partnership with Ethic, a sustainable investment firm based in New York City, which also manages the couple's investments. According to state filings from Delaware, where the couple's Archewell foundation is registered, Meghan and Harry incorporated 11 companies and a trust beginning in early 2020 which include Orinoco Publishing LLC and Peca Publishing LLC to hold the rights for their books as well as Cobblestone Lane LLC and IPHW LLC which are holders of their foundation's logos. Frim Fram Inc., which ran The Tig, had been registered earlier as a new corporation in Delaware in December 2019.

Harry & Meghan, a docuseries about the couple directed by Liz Garbus, was produced by Netflix and the couple's Archewell Productions and premiered on December 8, 2022. The series received mixed reviews. In April 2023, it was announced that she had signed with talent agency WME, which would represent Archewell as well, although by 2025 Ari Emanuel had stopped representing her personally.

In March 2024, Meghan launched the lifestyle and cooking brand American Riviera Orchard, which was later renamed As Ever. In April 2024, it was announced that Archewell Productions was collaborating with Netflix to produce two new shows on lifestyle and on polo, respectively. Later in August, it was revealed that she had invested in the handbag brand Cesta Collective, which sold handwoven basket bags prepared by a group of women in Rwanda that were then completed in Italy. In November of the same year she invested in the haircare line Highbrow Hippie. Her lifestyle series, With Love, Meghan premiered on Netflix in March 2025. In August 2025, Archewell Productions renewed its partnership with Netflix under a multi-year first-look deal, which included plans for a holiday special of With Love, Meghan, as well as further development of the As Ever brand and other documentary and scripted projects. On August 26, 2025, the second season of With Love, Meghan was released. In March 2026, it was announced that Netflix would be ending their partnership with As Ever and the brand would evolve independently.

In March 2025, it was announced that Meghan would host a second podcast series, Confessions of a Female Founder, with Lemonada Media. Between March and September 2025, she ran an online site via ShopMy, which allows content creators to share links to their favorite items while earning revenue through commissions. In April 2026, she joined the AI-powered fashion discovery platform OneOff as an investor and participant. The commercialization of outfits worn to certain public engagements such as hospital visits reportedly "caused considerable concern" among palace staff. That same month, she appeared as a guest judge on the 18th season of MasterChef Australia. In July 2026, she received her first Daytime Emmy Award nomination in the Outstanding Lifestyle Program category as one of the executive producers of With Love, Meghan.

In October 2026, Meghan was announced as a special guest on Junior MasterChef Australia.

== Charity work and advocacy ==
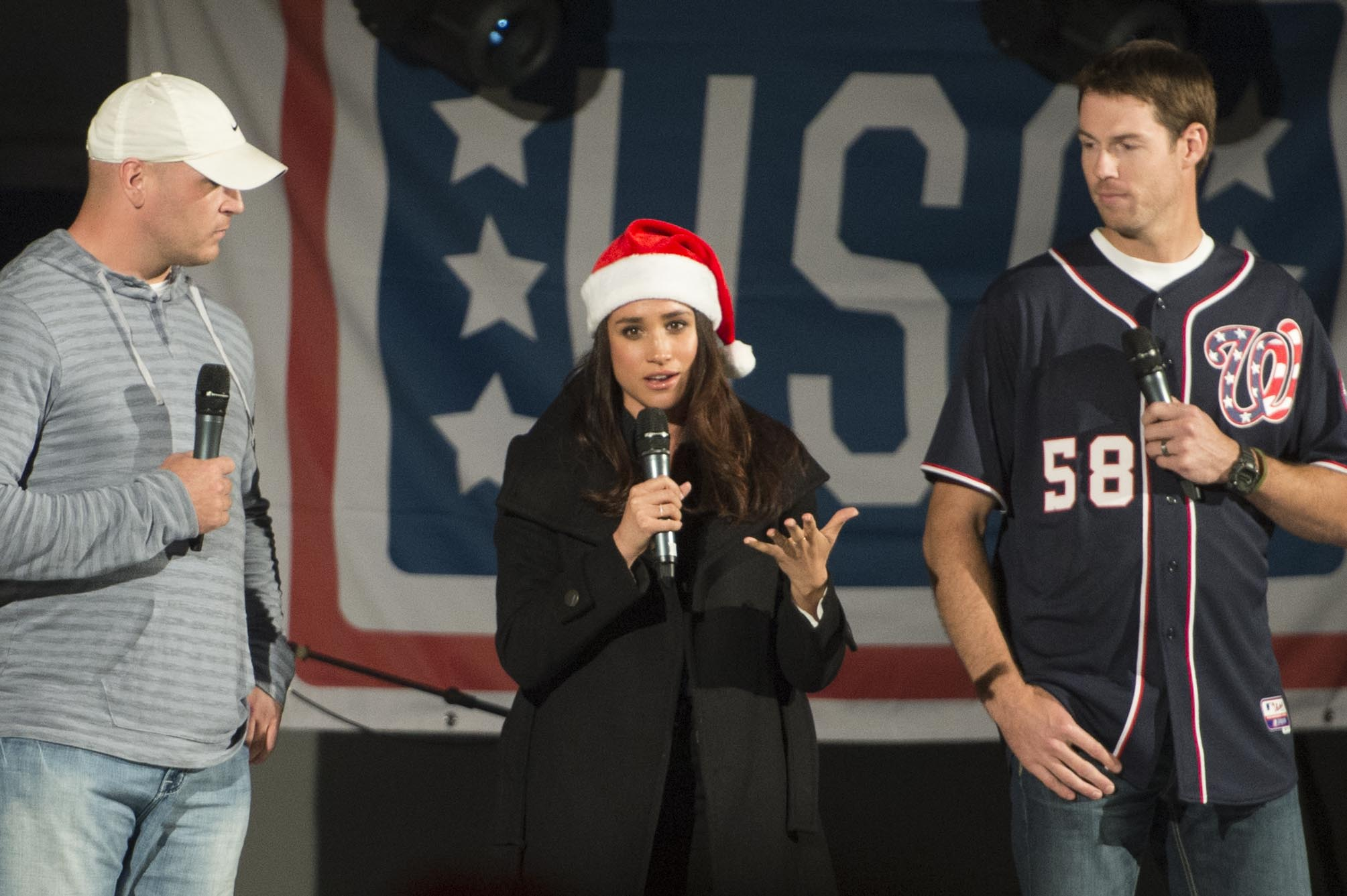
Markle addressing the audience during a USO show at Naval Station Rota, Spain, December 2014

Markle became a counsellor for the international network One Young World in 2014, spoke at its 2014 summit in Dublin and attended the 2016 opening ceremony in Ottawa. Also in 2014, she toured Spain, Italy, Turkey, Afghanistan and England with the United Service Organizations.

In 2016, Markle became a global ambassador for World Vision Canada, traveling to Rwanda for the Clean Water Campaign. After a trip to India focused on raising awareness for women's issues, she penned an op-ed for Time magazine concerning stigmatization of women in regard to menstrual health. She has also worked with the United Nations Entity for Gender Equality and the Empowerment of Women as an advocate. Her speech at the UN Women's 2015 conference as an advocate for political participation and leadership contained a number of sentences that were nearly identical to a 1951 speech by Eleanor Roosevelt. In 2017, Markle joined Harry in teaming up with the charity Elephants Without Borders to assist with the conservation efforts taking place in Botswana.

In January 2018, Markle became interested in the Hubb Community Kitchen run by survivors of the Grenfell Tower fire. She visited the kitchen regularly and suggested that the displaced women publish a cookbook to assist in funding for the group. Together: Our Community Cookbook, her first charity project as Duchess of Sussex, was announced in September. In August 2020, Meghan used proceeds from the cookbook to donate £8,000 to the UK charity Migrateful, which supports refugees, asylum seekers and migrants by helping them organize cookery classes. In March 2021, she donated £10,000 from the proceeds to the UK-based charity Himmah to assist them with stocking the group's food bank, provide them with equipment and help the Salaam Shalom Kitchen, the only Muslim and Jewish community kitchen in the UK.

In March 2020, it was announced that Meghan's first post-royal project would be the narration of Disneynature's documentary Elephant, which was released on April 3. In support of elephants, Disneynature and the Disney Conservation Fund would donate to Elephants Without Borders for species conservation in Botswana. In June 2020, the couple backed the Stop Hate for Profit campaign and encouraged CEOs of different companies to join the movement. In July 2020, she spoke in support of the Black Lives Matter movement.

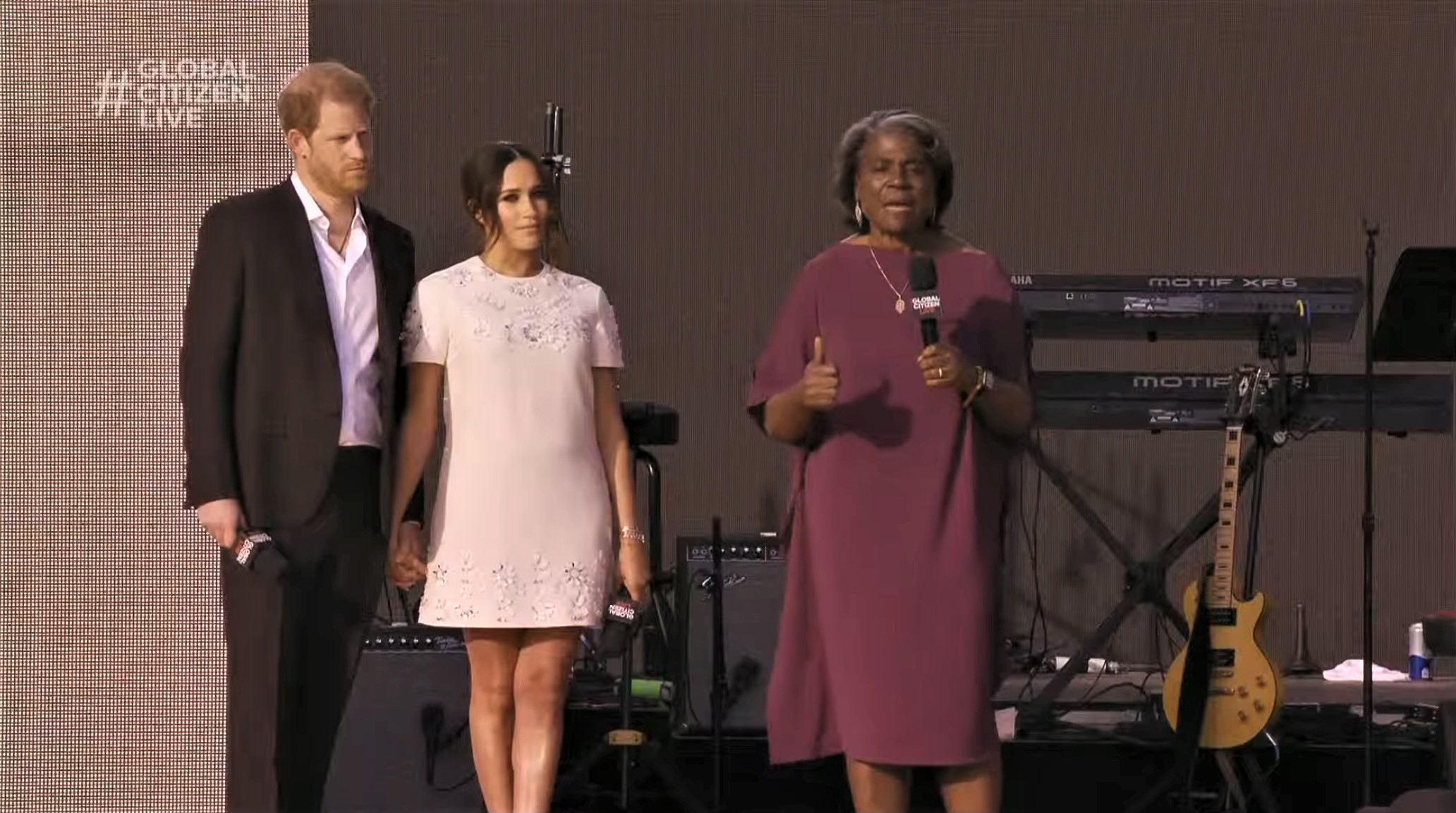
With Harry and the US ambassador to the UN Linda Thomas-Greenfield at the 2021 Global Citizen live event

In April 2021, the couple were announced as campaign chairs for Vax Live: The Concert to Reunite the World, an event organized by Global Citizen to increase access to COVID-19 vaccinations. They also announced their support for a vaccine equity fundraiser initiated by the same organization, and penned an open letter to the pharmaceutical industry CEOs urging them to address the vaccine equity crisis. In July 2021, Meghan and Harry were among people who were selected by UK-based charity Population Matters to receive the Change Champions Award for their decision to have only two children and help with maintaining a smaller and more sustainable population. In August 2021, to mark her 40th birthday, Meghan launched 40x40, a campaign that asks people around the world to spend 40 minutes of their time mentoring women reentering the workforce. In October 2021 and ahead of the 2021 G20 Rome summit, the couple penned an open letter together with the Director-General of the World Health Organization, Tedros Adhanom Ghebreyesus, asking the G20 leaders to expedite efforts for the global distribution of COVID-19 vaccines.

In February 2022, the couple were selected to receive NAACP's President's Award for their work on causes related to social justice and equity. In the following month, they were among more than a hundred people who signed an open letter published by the People's Vaccine Alliance, asking for free global access to COVID-19 vaccines and calling out the UK, EU and Switzerland for opposing a waiver that would allow vaccine intellectual property protections to be lifted. In October 2022, Meghan and Harry were named as Ripple of Hope Award laureates for their work on racial justice, mental health and other social initiatives through their foundation Archewell. In April 2023, she was named as a recipient of the Ms. Foundation for Women's Women of Vision Award. In October 2025, she and her husband received the Humanitarians of the Year award at Project Healthy Minds' annual gala in New York City in recognition of their commitment to mental health support. In the same month, they joined a coalition of public figures, scientists, and tech experts in signing an open letter calling for a global ban on the development of artificial superintelligence until there is strong scientific consensus and public support ensuring it can be created safely and ethically, emphasizing the existential risks such unchecked AI could pose to humanity.

=== Patronages and interests ===
From January 2019 to February 2021, Meghan was patron of London's National Theatre and the Association of Commonwealth Universities. She continued her role as the private patron of Mayhew until 2022. She remains a private patron of Smart Works. From March 2019 to February 2021, she was the vice president of The Queen's Commonwealth Trust. Until February 2021, periodically, online QCT chat sessions were conducted and uploaded to YouTube for general public viewing. In October 2019, along with other members of the royal family, Meghan voiced a Public Health England announcement, for the "Every Mind Matters" mental health program.

In 2019 Meghan was a contributor and guest editor for the September issue of British Vogue and highlighted the works of 15 women from different areas, who were described as "Forces for Change". Edward Enninful, editor-in-chief of the British Vogue, later revealed that the issue had become the "fastest-selling issue in the history of British Vogue". In the same issue, it was announced that she had collaborated with a number of British fashion houses and stores to launch a capsule collection, called The Smart Set, in September 2019 to benefit the charity Smart Works. The collection sought to help "unemployed and disadvantaged women", through selling items "on a one-for-one basis, meaning an item is donated for each item purchased". Taking advantage of the "Meghan Markle effect" (driving consumer purchases), in 10 days the collection provided a year's worth of clothes for the charity.

==== Sussex Royal and Archewell ====
In February 2018, Markle and fiancé Harry attended the first annual forum of The Royal Foundation. After marriage, Meghan became the foundation's fourth patron alongside Harry, Prince William and his wife, Catherine. In May 2019, as a part of their Heads Together initiative, the Duchess of Sussex together with her husband and in-laws launched Shout, a text messaging service for those who suffer from mental issues. In June 2019, it was announced that Harry and Meghan would split from the charity and establish their own foundation. Nevertheless, the couples would collaborate on mutual projects, such as the mental health initiative Heads Together. The following month, "Sussex Royal The Foundation of The Duke and Duchess of Sussex" was registered in England and Wales. However, it was confirmed on February 21, 2020, that "Sussex Royal" would not be used as a brand name for the couple, following their step back from official life as working royals. On August 5, 2020, the Sussex Royal Foundation was renamed "MWX Foundation" and dissolved the same day.

In March 2021, it was reported that the Charity Commission for England and Wales was conducting a review of the Sussex Royal organization in a "regulatory and compliance case" regarding its conduct under charity law during dissolution. Representatives for the couple claimed that Sussex Royal was "managed by a board of trustees" and that "suggestion of mismanagement" directed exclusively at the Duke and Duchess would be incorrect. The commission later concluded that the foundation did not act unlawfully, but criticized the board of directors for expending a "substantial proportion of funds" to setting up and closing the charity.

In April 2020, Meghan and Harry confirmed that an alternative foundation (in lieu of Sussex Royal) would be called "Archewell". The name stems from the Greek word "arche", which means "source of action" – the same word that inspired the name of their son. Archewell was registered in the United States. Its website was officially launched in October 2020.

== Public image and style ==
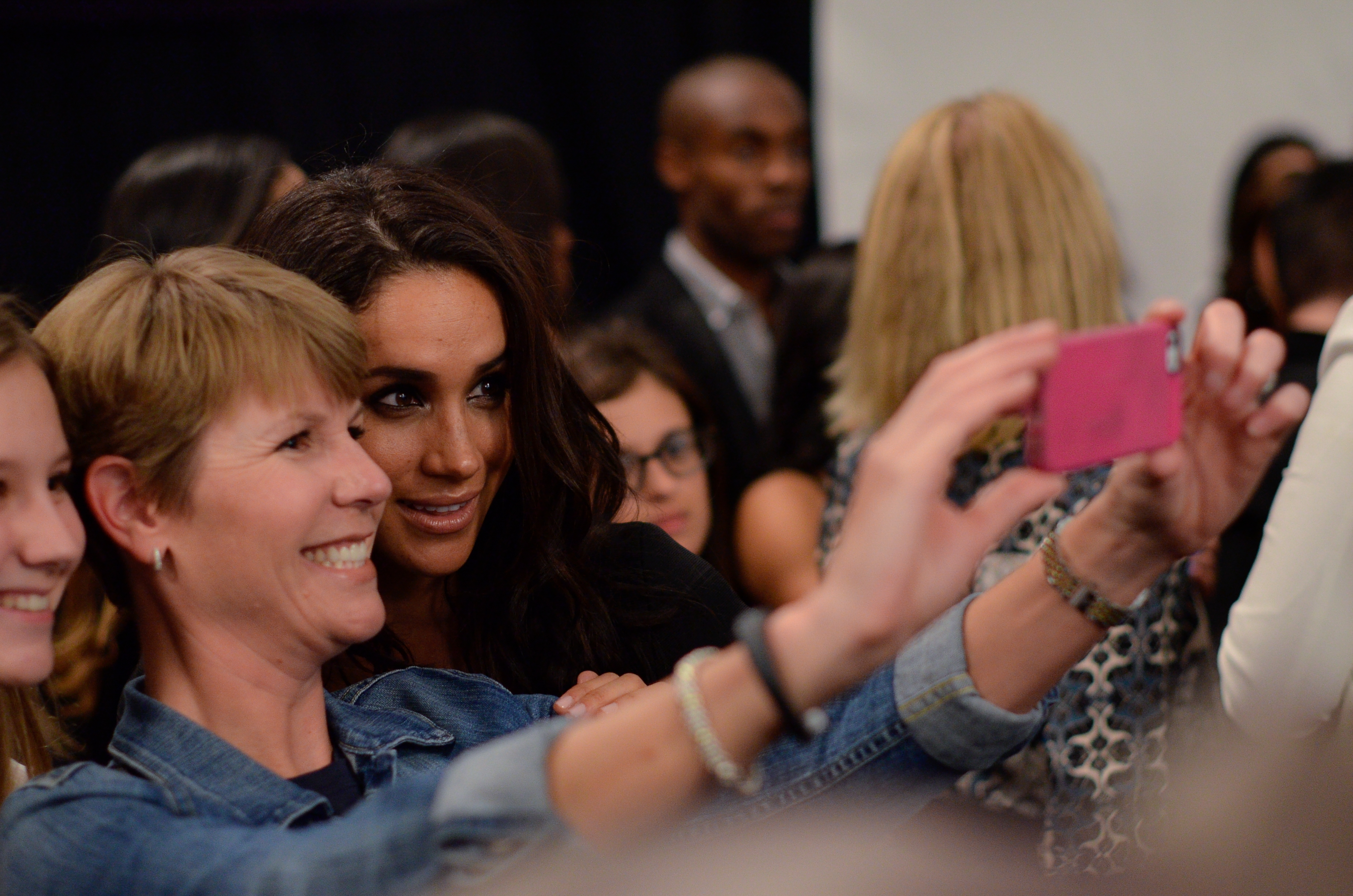
Markle (third from left) at New York Fashion Week in 2013

Between 2010 and 2012, Markle anonymously ran the blog The Working Actress, which detailed the "pitfalls and triumphs of struggling to make it in Hollywood". In 2014, she founded the lifestyle blog The Tig, which featured articles about food, fashion, beauty, travel, and inspirational women. The viewing audience consisted primarily of fans of Markle and Suits. Promotion of the blog on other social media platforms targeted three million followers on Instagram, 800,000 on Facebook and 350,000 on Twitter. In April 2017, The Tig closed. In January 2018, Markle took all articles offline and deleted her social media accounts. It is estimated that Markle's social media activities annually earned her about $80,000 from endorsements and sponsorships. She rejoined Instagram in January 2025. She was also known for socializing at Soho House.

Markle became known through The Tig for her fashion sense, releasing two fashion collections with Canadian clothing company Reitmans in 2015 and 2016. The lines were based on her personal style and that of her Suits character. Meghan has cited Emmanuelle Alt as her style inspiration. In 2016, she hosted USA Network's video series Power Lunch with Meghan Markle in collaboration with Lexus and Eater, discussing the culinary inspirations of five different New York kitchens.

In 2015, Markle visited Malta after discovering an ancestor had been born there. Her trip was documented by Elle UK. She was featured in the cover story for the October 2017 issue of Vanity Fair and the December 2017 issue of Elle France. Shortly after her engagement to Harry in 2017, she caused a surge of interest in Scottish retailer Strathberry after carrying one of its handbags to a public event. This was reported as an indication that her fashion choices would produce results similar to the Kate Middleton effect. After Markle and Harry's first appearance as a couple, the brands Mackage, Birks, R&R Jewelers, Crown Jewelers, and Everlane noted an upswing in their website hits and sales. It was speculated that Markle's effect would be broader internationally because she already had a strong American appeal, and the United States saw an overall increase in yellow gold jewelry sales in the first quarter of 2018.

In 2018, Tatler included Meghan with other senior royal women on its list of Britain's best dressed people. Following the announcement of her pregnancy, she appeared in a Karen Gee dress that resulted in the Australian designer's website crashing. Fashion website Net-a-Porter ranked Meghan as one of the best dressed women in 2018. She was nominated for the 2018 Teen Choice Awards in the category Choice Style Icon. In 2019, British brand Reiss reported a growth in profits after Meghan was seen wearing a mini dress by them on International Women's Day. In 2022, the black Armani dress worn by Meghan during her Oprah interview was selected by the Fashion Museum, Bath, as Dress of the Year 2021. In the same year, she was featured in the cover story for the 2022 Fall Fashion issue of The Cut. There was controversy over her claim in the interview that she had been told at the premiere of The Lion King that her marriage resulted in rejoicing in South Africa similar to that seen at Nelson Mandela's release from prison in 1990.

In 2018, Time selected Meghan as one of the 100 Most Influential People in the World and placed her on its shortlist for Person of the Year. Her name appeared again on the listicle in 2021, and she and her husband were featured on one of the magazine's seven worldwide covers. In 2019, the magazine named Meghan and Harry among the 25 Most Influential People on the Internet. She was also chosen as one of the 25 most influential women in the United Kingdom by British Vogue magazine in 2018, 2019, and 2021. Her influence was also recognized in both the 2019 and 2020 editions of Powerlist, the 100 most influential Britons of African and Afro-Caribbean descent. In 2022, she was named as one of the 50 Women Changing the World over the past year by Worth magazine. In the same year, Variety named her as a stellar honoree for its Power of Women issue, and Financial Times included her on its list of "25 most influential women of 2022". In December 2022, Meghan was found to be the second most disliked member of the British royal family by statistics and polling company YouGov, behind her husband's uncle Prince Andrew. In March 2023, The Independent included her on its "Influence List 2023". Meghan and Harry's exit from the royal family was satirized in a 2023 episode of South Park. In the same year, James Hibberd of The Hollywood Reporter named Meghan and Harry among the Hollywood losers of 2023.

Following Meghan and Harry's trip to Nigeria in May 2024, Lucia Stein of the ABC argued that the couple could have been used by the royal family, and added that "perhaps how helpful they would have been" had an agreement on a "hybrid working model" been achieved. Among other things, she noted Meghan's style and meetings were extensively covered internationally. In January 2025, Harry and Meghan's appearance at a food bank during the Southern California wildfires in the Pacific Palisades drew mixed reactions from segments of the media and public figures, who labeled it "disaster tourism".

== Privacy and the media ==
=== Court cases ===
==== Associated Newspapers Limited ====
In November 2016, the MailOnline was criticized for running an article on Markle's family background titled "(Almost) Straight Outta Compton", which triggered a response from Harry's communications secretary. Between 2019 and 2020, Meghan and Harry contributed to the book Finding Freedom through a third-party source. Despite initially denying their involvement with the book, their contributions to the book became apparent during her court case against Associated Newspapers who were trying to use the book in their defense. In October 2019, Meghan filed a lawsuit against Associated Newspapers Limited (ANL), the publisher of The Mail on Sunday and MailOnline over the publication of a letter she had sent to her father. Thomas Markle Sr. had provided the publisher with excerpts of the letter after five of his daughter's friends referenced it in a People article. She subsequently received support from more than 70 female MPs from different parties who in an open letter condemned the use of "outdated, colonial undertones" against her in some national media outlets. In May 2020, the court dismissed claims of the tabloid's alleged dishonesty and malice, as they were deemed either vague or irrelevant to the case. In February 2021, the High Court of Justice found in a summary judgment that ANL's Mail on Sunday had invaded Meghan's privacy by publishing the letter, and she won her claim for "misuse of private information and copyright infringement" in May 2021. She was given a £450,000 down payment on her £1.5 million legal fees as an interim payment, and pursuant to copyright law, her legal team asked for a front-page statement by The Mail on Sunday and MailOnline to acknowledge her legal victory.

An appeal was subsequently launched by ANL in November 2021. In December 2021, three senior appeal judges upheld the judgement of the High Court against ANL, prompting Meghan to call for reform of the tabloid industry. In the same month, ANL's The Mail on Sunday and MailOnline published a front-page statement on Boxing Day acknowledging Meghan's victory, adding that there had been an agreement on "financial remedies". In addition to covering a portion of Meghan's legal costs, the outlet agreed to pay her £1 in damages for invading her privacy and a confidential sum for infringing her copyright. They were also banned from naming Meghan's friends who had spoken to People magazine about the letter in 2018.

==== Other cases and complaints ====
In November 2016, The Sun ran the headline "Harry girl's on Pornhub". The outlet denied any smear after it was revealed that the clips were illegally uploaded scenes from the TV series Suits and not pornographic material. They subsequently apologized via an official statement in February 2017. In February 2018, a letter containing white powder and a racist note addressing Markle was sent to St James's Palace, triggering counter-terrorism and hate crime investigations by Scotland Yard. Meghan and Harry obtained a formal apology in May 2019 from Splash News for privacy invasion at their Cotswolds residence. In December 2019, PA Media retracted the publishing of a Christmas card photograph of Meghan, Harry, and their son Archie. The agency said that the photo was retracted because they had been advised that the photograph was "not representative of the Christmas card sent by the Duke and Duchess of Sussex". The couple had a legal warning issued to the press in general in January 2020 after the publication of paparazzi photographs. In March 2020, the couple took Splash UK to court after Meghan and her son were photographed without permission in Canada during a "private family outing". The case was settled later that year with Splash UK agreeing to no longer take unauthorized photos of the family. The Duke and Duchess announced in April that they would no longer cooperate with the Daily Mail, The Sun, Daily Mirror and Daily Express. They won an apology in October from American news agency X17 for taking photographs of their son at their home using drones.

In March 2021, ITV News reported Meghan had complained directly to ITV's CEO about Piers Morgan's comments on mental health following her interview with Oprah Winfrey. Ofcom received over 57,000 complaints about the program including one from the Duchess of Sussex. In the same month, it was reported that an American private investigator unlawfully handed over personal details about Meghan to The Sun, including her Social Security number, cell phone number and address, when she first started dating Harry in 2016. Meghan and her husband condemned the "predatory practices" of the British tabloids, while The Sun stated that the investigator "was instructed clearly in writing to act lawfully", and they did not "use the information he provided for any unlawful practice".

In July 2021, Meghan filed legal complaints against The Times for two separate articles, with the first one covering an unproven allegation from Robert Lacey's book that she had left an engagement in Fiji for not being appointed by UN Women as a goodwill ambassador and the second one claiming that the Duke and Duchess of Cambridge had refused to talk to Harry after Prince Philip's funeral due to fears of a potential leak. In January 2022, the couple jointly filed a legal complaint against The Times for an article reporting on Archewell raising less than $50,000 in 2020. In the same month, she complained to the BBC regarding their five-part podcast Harry, Meghan and the Media, in which the presenter Amol Rajan stated that Meghan had "apologized for misleading" the Court of Appeal in her case against the Mail on Sunday. The BBC responded by issuing a statement on its "corrections and clarifications" website to emphasize that she had "apologized to the court for not remembering email exchanges".

In March 2022, Meghan's half-sister, Samantha Markle, filed a defamation lawsuit against her in Florida, accusing her of lying in the Oprah interview and disseminating false statements via her communications secretary for the book Finding Freedom and sought damages in excess of $75,000. In June 2022, Meghan's initial motion to dismiss the case was rejected by a judge following amendments made by Samantha in her complaint. She filed a second motion in the same month. In addition to applying for the case to be dismissed, Meghan's lawyer also applied for the discovery process to be delayed, pending the outcome of the dismissal application. A Florida judge later denied the application to halt the discovery process, but dismissed the lawsuit in March 2023. In April 2023, Samantha refiled the lawsuit with another amended complaint that covered statements made by Meghan in her Netflix docuseries as well. The lawsuit was later dismissed with prejudice in March 2024, after a judge ruled that the claimant was unable to provide evidence of defamation. Samantha later appealed the decision.

Between December 2022 and January 2023, more than 25,000 complaints were submitted to the Independent Press Standards Organisation (IPSO) about a column by Jeremy Clarkson in The Sun, in which he stated that he hated Meghan "on a cellular level" and dreamed "of the day when she is made to parade naked through the streets of every town in Britain while the crowds chant, 'Shame!' and throw lumps of excrement at her." On December 20, 2022, Conservative MP Caroline Nokes wrote to The Sun's editor, Victoria Newton, calling for "action [to be] taken" against Clarkson. The letter was signed by more than 60 cross-party MPs. On December 23, The Sun issued an apology, stating "columnists' opinions are their own" but they "regret the publication of this article" and are "sincerely sorry". On the following day, a spokesperson for the Duke and Duchess of Sussex described the apology as "nothing more than a PR stunt". Clarkson said his column was a reference to a scene from the television series Game of Thrones and he later revealed that he had emailed Meghan and Harry on Christmas Day 2022 to apologise. A spokesperson for the couple said Clarkson wrote solely to Harry and the article was not an isolated incident. In February 2023, IPSO announced that it was launching an investigation about the article. In June 2023, IPSO concluded that the column was sexist and contained a "pejorative and prejudicial reference" to Meghan's sex, but it rejected complaints that the piece raised an issue of fact, or was meant to harass her or included discriminatory references on the grounds of race.

In April 2026, Harry and Meghan's team refused to provide details of the couple's visit to Australia to Guardian Australia, alleging that Daily Mail, Daily Mirror and Sky News Australia had broken a strict embargo on the couple's tour itinerary. Sky News Australia denied the allegations, following which the couple stated that unlike the Mail neither Sky News nor the Daily Mirror were "formally bound" by the embargo but criticized them for opting to report on the details revealed by the Mail. In September 2026, Meghan and Harry criticized two international photographers for "walking the perimeter" of their children's school, describing their conduct as an "unacceptable intrusion" into the privacy of children.

=== Bullying allegations and Oprah interview ===
In 2021, shortly before Meghan and Harry were due to be interviewed by Oprah Winfrey, Valentine Low reported in The Times that Meghan's former communications secretary, Jason Knauf, complained in October 2018 that her conduct at Kensington Palace had caused two personal assistants to quit and had undermined the confidence of a third employee, prompting an investigation by Buckingham Palace into the bullying allegations. The palace hired an external law firm to examine the claims, with ten aides reported to have cooperated with the review. Criticism of Meghan for twice wearing earrings gifted from Saudi Crown Prince Mohammed bin Salman in 2018, after he was accused of complicity in the assassination of Jamal Khashoggi, appeared at the same time. Her representatives denied her awareness of the accusations against Mohammed bin Salman and said The Times was being used by Buckingham Palace for "a smear campaign" against her.

The television special Oprah with Meghan and Harry was broadcast on CBS on March 7, 2021. Meghan spoke about her personal and royal life and public pressure. She claimed to have been contemplating suicide during her time as a working royal and complained of a lack of protection for her and her son while being part of the royal institution. There was a wide and polarized reaction to the interview.

In an updated epilogue for the couple's unauthorized biography, Finding Freedom by Omid Scobie and Carolyn Durand, the authors claimed that "two of the individuals mentioned in [Knauf's] email asked for any allegations made to HR about their experiences with Meghan to be rescinded". Speaking on behalf of the Duchess in a BBC documentary, Jenny Afia, a lawyer who represented Meghan in her case against ANL, stated that the bullying allegations were "just not true". In June 2022, The Times reported that the results from the inquiry made Buckingham Palace modify some of the policies and procedures in its HR department, but the report would not be published to ensure the privacy of those who took part in it. In September 2024 The Hollywood Reporter reported on complaints raised by American staff members about Meghan's behavior. Her spokesperson declined to comment. In January 2025 Vanity Fair, who spoke with Meghan's employees, reported on their descriptions of her varying from "lovely, genuine person" to "cold and withholding", adding that a staff member with ties to Archetypes took a leave of absence while a number of others talked about quitting their jobs, taking long absences from work to avoid attention, or going through long-term therapy after working with her.

=== On Twitter and other platforms ===
In 2019, CNN had reported on research by Hope not Hate, stating that out of 5,200 "abusive tweets directed at Meghan" in January and February 2019, 3,600 came from a small group of trolls. In March 2019, the royal family introduced new rules for followers commenting on its official social media accounts in response to the online abuse aimed at Meghan and her sister-in-law Catherine. In October 2021, Twitter analytics service Bot Sentinel alleged they found 83 accounts with a combined number of 187,631 followers that were possibly responsible for approximately 70% of the negative content posted about Meghan and Harry. The report prompted an investigation by Twitter. The company stated that it found no evidence of "widespread coordination" between the accounts and said that it had taken action against users who violated Twitter's conduct policy. Bot Sentinel released three more reports in the following months. In January 2022, the BBC named Meghan and Harry among people whose photos and videos were used in fake instant profits advertisements and bitcoin-related investment schemes. Among theories widespread on social media, including Twitter and YouTube, were unfounded assertions that Meghan had faked her pregnancies, instead using surrogate mother(s), or that her children do not exist at all. Meghan's half-sister, Samantha, was reported to have run multiple Twitter accounts that targeted Meghan.

In March 2019, European consulting firm 89up reported on their discovery of 1,103 highly connected Twitter accounts with more than two and a half million tweets in favor of Meghan, most of which appeared to be bots carrying out "coordinated attacks" on royal correspondents who had reported negatively on her. In June 2021, after misquoting Meghan on a TV program, journalist Camilla Tominey stated that she had received abuse on Twitter and via email, which resulted in Twitter and the police taking action. In 2022, royal commentator Victoria Arbiter reported receiving extensive online abuse after commenting on an interview with Harry and Meghan before it aired, including personal attacks and the publication of her home address, according to The Telegraph. The newspaper also reported that author Alexander Larman faced online abuse after criticising Meghan's lifestyle brand. In October 2026, it was reported that a group of the couple's online supporters had targeted critics of Meghan, including a priest who criticised the price of her Advent calendar. The newspaper also described allegations of doxxing and harassment against people who had argued with the group, as well as conspiracy theories circulated by some supporters about Catherine, Princess of Wales, and her cancer diagnosis. The extent of Meghan's awareness of such activity was unclear and the group included both devoted supporters and accounts whose authenticity was uncertain.

== Titles, styles and arms ==
Meghan became a princess of the United Kingdom upon her marriage to Harry, entitled to the style of Royal Highness. After her marriage, she was styled "Her Royal Highness The Duchess of Sussex". She also holds the titles of Countess of Dumbarton and Baroness Kilkeel. She is the first person to hold the title "Duchess of Sussex".

Following the Duke and Duchess's decision to step back from royal duties in 2020, the couple agreed not to use the style of Royal Highness in practice or publicly, but they are still referred to as "His/Her Royal Highness" in legal and private settings. A letter from the Lord Chamberlain, issued at the direction of King Charles III in 2026, reaffirmed that their HRH styles were still in abeyance.

During Meghan's trip to Nigeria in May 2024, Igwe Alfred Achebe, the Obi of Onitsha, and Oba Abdulrasheed Adewale Akanbi, the Oluwo of Iwo, gave her the chieftaincy titles Ada Mazi (transl. 'the daughter of the Igbo ancestral palace') and Adetokunbo (transl. 'royalty from across the seas').

Coat of arms of the Duchess of Sussex
Notes The Duchess bears the arms of her husband impaled with her own. Thomas Woodcock, Garter King of Arms, the senior officer of the College of Arms, helped the Duchess with the design, which was approved by the Queen. Adopted May 25, 2018 Coronet Coronet of a child of the sovereign. Escutcheon Quarterly 1st and 4th Gules three lions passant guardant in pale Or armed and langed Azure (England), 2nd Or a lion rampant Gules armed and langued Azure within a double tressure flory counterflory (Scotland), 3rd Azure a harp Or stringed Argent (Ireland), the whole differenced by a label of three points Argent, each point charged with an escallop Gules (Prince Harry); Impaled with a shield Azure a feather bendwise Argent quilled Or between two bendlets Or all between two like feathers Argent quilled Or (Markle). Supporters On the dexter side the lion used as a supporter by the Duke of Sussex and to the sinister a songbird Argent wings spread, unguled Or and gorged with the coronet of the Duke of Sussex. Compartment Below the shield, a mount of grass with golden poppies and wintersweet in flower. Symbolism The blue background of the shield represents the Pacific Ocean off the California coast, while the two golden rays across the shield are symbolic of the sunshine of the Duchess's home state. The three quills represent communication and the power of words. Beneath the shield on the grass sits a collection of golden poppies, California's state flower and wintersweet, which grows at Kensington Palace. The songbird with wings elevated as if flying and an open beak represents the power of communication. Previous versions Arms between 2018 and 2022

== Filmography ==
=== Film ===
Key
†	Denotes films that have not yet been released

Year	Title	Role	Notes
2005	A Lot like Love	Natalie "Hot Girl"	Cameo
2010	Remember Me	Megan	
2010	Get Him to the Greek	Tatiana	Uncredited
2010	The Candidate	Kat	Short film
2011	Horrible Bosses	Jamie	
2012	Dysfunctional Friends	Terry	
2013	Random Encounters	Mindy	British title: A Random Encounter
2015	Anti-Social	Kirsten	
2020	Elephant	Narrator	Disneynature film; credit: Meghan, The Duchess of Sussex
TBA	Close Personal Friends †	Herself	Post-production

=== Television ===
Year	Title	Role	Notes
1995	Married... with Children	Student	1 episode "The Undergraduate" (season 9: episode 26); uncredited
2001	General Hospital	Jill	2 episodes
2004	Century City	Natasha	1 episode "A Mind is a Terrible Thing to Lose" (season 1: episode 4)
2005	Cuts	Cori	1 episode "My Boyfriend's Back" (season 1: episode 5)
2005	Love, Inc.	Teresa Santos	1 episode "One on One" (season 1: episode 9)
2006	1 vs. 100	Herself	1 episode "Mob member number 7" (Episode 101)
2006	The War at Home	Susan	1 episode "The Seventeen-Year Itch" (season 1: episode 17)
2006	Deceit	Gwen	Television movie
2006	CSI: NY	Veronica Perez	1 episode "Murder Sings the Blues" (season 3: episode 7)
2006–2007	Deal or No Deal	Herself	Holder of Case #24; 34 episodes
2008	90210	Wendy	1 episode "We're Not in Kansas Anymore" (season 1: episode 1) "The Jet Set" (season 1: episode 2)
2008	'Til Death	Tara	1 episode "Joy Ride" (season 3: episode 2)
2008	The Apostles	Kelly Calhoun	Television movie
2008	Good Behavior	Sadie Valencia	Television movie
2009	Knight Rider	Annie Ortiz	1 episode "Fight Knight" (season 1: episode 14)
2009	Without a Trace	Holly Shepard	1 episode "Chameleon" (season 7: episode 15)
2009	Fringe	Junior FBI Agent Amy Jessup	2 episodes "A New Day in the Old Town" (season 2: episode 1) "Night of Desirable Objects" (season 2: episode 2)
2009	The League	Meghan	1 episode "The Bounce Test" (season 1: episode 2)
2010	CSI: Miami	Officer Leah Montoya	1 episode "Backfire" (season 8: episode 20)
2010	The Boys & Girls Guide to Getting Down	Dana	Television movie
2011–2018	Suits	Rachel Zane	Series regular (seasons 1–7), 108 episodes (Markle's final scene was filmed in 2017)
2012	Castle	Charlotte Boyd / Sleeping Beauty	1 episode "Once Upon a Crime" (season 4: episode 17)
2014	When Sparks Fly	Amy Peterson	Hallmark Channel television movies
2016	Dater's Handbook	Cassandra Brand	Hallmark Channel television movies
2016	Chopped Junior	Herself	Reality television series
2018	Queen of the World	Herself	HBO documentary
2019	Harry & Meghan: An African Journey	Herself	ITV documentary
2021	Oprah with Meghan and Harry	Herself	CBS Special interview
2022	Harry & Meghan	Herself	Netflix series
2022	Live to Lead	Herself	Netflix series
2023	Heart of Invictus	Herself	Netflix series
2024	Polo	Herself	Netflix series
2025	With Love, Meghan	Herself	Netflix series
2026	MasterChef Australia	Herself	Reality television series

== Bibliography ==
=== Books ===
- Markle, Meghan (1996). A Face without Freckles... Is a Night without Stars.
- HRH The Duchess of Sussex, "Foreword", in: The Hubb Community Kitchen (2018). Together: Our Community Cookbook. Ebury Press. ISBN 978-1529102925. OCLC 1055685147. Archived from the original on June 25, 2022.
- Meghan, The Duchess of Sussex (2021). The Bench. Illustrated by Christian Robinson. Random House Children's Books. ISBN 978-0593434512.

=== Authored articles and letters ===
- Markle, Meghan (May 2015). "It's All Enough". Darling Magazine., republished online, November 6, 2018.
- Markle, Meghan (July 2015). "I'm More Than An 'Other'". ELLE., republished online, December 22, 2016.
- Markle, Meghan (November 9, 2016). "With Fame Comes Opportunity, But Also A Responsibility". ELLE.
- Markle, Meghan (March 8, 2017). "How Periods Affect Potential". Time.
- HRH The Duchess of Sussex (July 29, 2019). "HRH The Duchess of Sussex Introduces The September Issue In Her Own Words". Vogue (British ed.).
- HRH The Duchess of Sussex (July 31, 2019). "HRH The Duchess of Sussex Shares A New Smart Works Initiative". Vogue (British ed.).
- Meghan, The Duchess of Sussex (August 26, 2020). "Meghan, The Duchess of Sussex: My conversation with Gloria Steinem". Yahoo!.
- Meghan, The Duchess of Sussex (November 25, 2020). "The Losses We Share". The New York Times. ISSN 0362-4331. Archived from the original on November 25, 2020.
- Meghan, The Duchess of Sussex (October 20, 2021). "A Letter on Paid Leave from Meghan, The Duchess of Sussex". Paid Leave for All.
- Tedros Adhanom Ghebreyesus; Prince Harry, The Duke of Sussex; Meghan, The Duchess of Sussex (October 29, 2021). "Meeting the COVID-19 vaccine commitments". World Health Organization. Archived from the original on October 29, 2021.
- Meghan, The Duchess of Sussex (April 6, 2022). "A message from Meghan, The Duchess of Sussex". Mayhew.

== Notes ==
Orders of precedence in the United Kingdom
Preceded by The Princess of Wales	Ladies; The Duchess of Sussex	Followed by Princess Charlotte of Wales
