= Strathberry =

Scottish fashion accessory company

Strathberry Ltd.
- Type: Private limited company
- Industry: Fashion
- Founded: 2011; 15 years ago
- Founders: Clare Robertson; Guy Hundleby; Leeanne Hundleby
- Headquarters: Edinburgh, Scotland, UK
- Products: Fashion accessories (handbags)
- Website: www.strathberry.com

Strathberry, formerly known as Strathberry of Scotland, is a luxury fashion accessories company based in Edinburgh, Scotland. It was co-founded in 2011 by Guy Hundleby and Leeanne Hundleby, with Clare Robertson as Creative Director.

The brand, as Strathberry of Scotland, produced tweed and leather goods including wallets, tablet computer covers, scarves and golf bags that were priced up to £4350.00. The company opened a shop in the Grassmarket area of Edinburgh in July 2013, but it closed six months later. In late 2013, they struck a deal to sell a range of products in Beijing and Shanghai through Chinese retailer The Estate, and elsewhere in Edinburgh through Harvey Nichols. Robertson left the company in 2014.

In 2015 the company relaunched as Strathberry, with Guy and Leeanne Hundleby as sole Creative and Managing directors. The new Strathberry had a distinctly different aesthetic and product range; focusing solely on creating accessibly priced luxury leather handbags with clean, minimal designs. The Hundlebys launched a Kickstarter campaign to fund the new Strathberry brand, with a goal of £25,000; 526 backers pledged £122,363, for rewards of Strathberry goods, during the campaign.

The firm enjoyed a surge in interest in December 2017, after American actress Meghan Markle carried one of their handbags during her first official public appearance with her fiancé Prince Harry. This was reported as an early indication that Markle's fashion choices would produce her own version of the Kate Middleton effect.

The company also operates 3 boutiques, located in Edinburgh, London and Shanghai.
