= Karen Gee =

Australian fashion designer (born 1973)

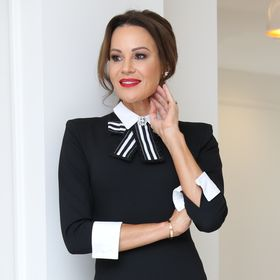
- Born: Karen Martin; 1973 (age 52–53); Rockhampton, Queensland, Australia
- Education: St. Peters Lutheran College Brisbane; Harvard Business School
- Occupation: Fashion designer
- Years active: 2013–present
- Website: karengee.com

Karen Gee (née Martin; born 1973) is an Australian women fashion designer who is the founder of eponymous fashion label, Karen Gee.

== Early life and education ==
Gee was born Karen Martin in 1973 and raised in Rockhampton, Queensland, in a family of small business owners. She attended St Peters Lutheran College in Brisbane and later undertook study at Harvard Business School.

== Career ==
In 2011, Gee was crowned Mrs Australia Globe, a national pageant for married women aged over 25 that raises funds for charity.

In 2013, Gee founded her eponymous fashion label.

In 2015, Gee opened her first bricks-and-mortar store at Chifley Plaza. In 2016, Gee was named a finalist in the St.George Banking Group AusMumpreneur Awards and placed third in the national AusMumpreneur of the Year category.

On 16 October 2018, Meghan, Duchess of Sussex, wore Gee's white Blessed shift dress to meet the Governor-General of Australia at Admiralty House in Kirribilli on the first day of her royal tour of Australia with Prince Harry. It was Markle's first public appearance after Kensington Palace announced her pregnancy. In 2022, Jodie Haydon, partner of Australian prime minister Anthony Albanese, wore Gee's custom Leader dress to the state funeral of Queen Elizabeth II in London. On 14 April 2026, during Meghan's first return visit to Australia since 2018, the Duchess of Sussex wore Gee's sleeveless navy Priscilla midi dress to the Royal Children's Hospital in Melbourne.

Other personalities who have worn her designs include Melissa Doyle, Lisa Wilkinson, Sonia Kruger, Sylvia Jeffreys, Rebel Wilson, Bethenny Frankel, and Gladys Berejiklian.

== Awards and recognition ==
- Title of Mrs Australia (2012)
