= The Tig (website) =

Lifestyle blog

- Website type: Lifestyle blog
- Available in: English
- Founded: 2014
- Dissolved: 2017
- Owner: Frim Fram Inc.
- Founder: Meghan Markle
- Website: thetig.com
- Current status: Inactive

The Tig was a lifestyle blog created and run by American actress Meghan Markle between 2014 and 2017.

== History ==
The website was created and launched by Markle in May 2014 to share various aspects of her life which she found inspiring, including information on food, diet, fashion, beauty and travel. It also featured interviews with different public figures and celebrities such as Yara Shahidi, Priyanka Chopra, and Serena Williams, as well as personal essays written by Markle. The name was inspired by Tignanello wine, which according to her is synonymous with "getting it". The Canadian digital agency Article was behind the website's design. The website's audience consisted of Markle's fans who primarily followed her work as an actress on the TV series Suits. It was reported in the press that the website's revenue was around $80,000 per year, which would come from sources such as affiliate marketing. The website was shut down in April 2017 with the official reason given being her desire to focus on her role on Suits and on her charity work. Markle at the time was in a relationship with Prince Harry, whom she eventually married in 2018. Markle's biographers later confirmed in the book Finding Freedom that she shut down the website to avoid it being "used to fuel false speculation about her personal life with the prince". Frim Fram Inc., which ran The Tig, was registered as a new corporation in Delaware in December 2019.

== Reception ==
Reflecting on the website's content, Kate Lloyd of Vogue argued Markle's "interests lean more towards snuggling her dog and drinking craft cocktails than baking fruit pies and reading romance novels". She added that Markle "was a master at lacing seemingly innocent lifestyle guides with genuinely revealing titbits about her life". Writing for Vanity Fair Josh Duboff believed that Markle seemed "pretty low-key" and came off "as a practical (if occasionally quite whimsical), individual. She likes her playlists, her favorite foods, and her friends, and ... that seems to be the bulk of it".
