= Tig (software) =

Text user interface for Git version control software

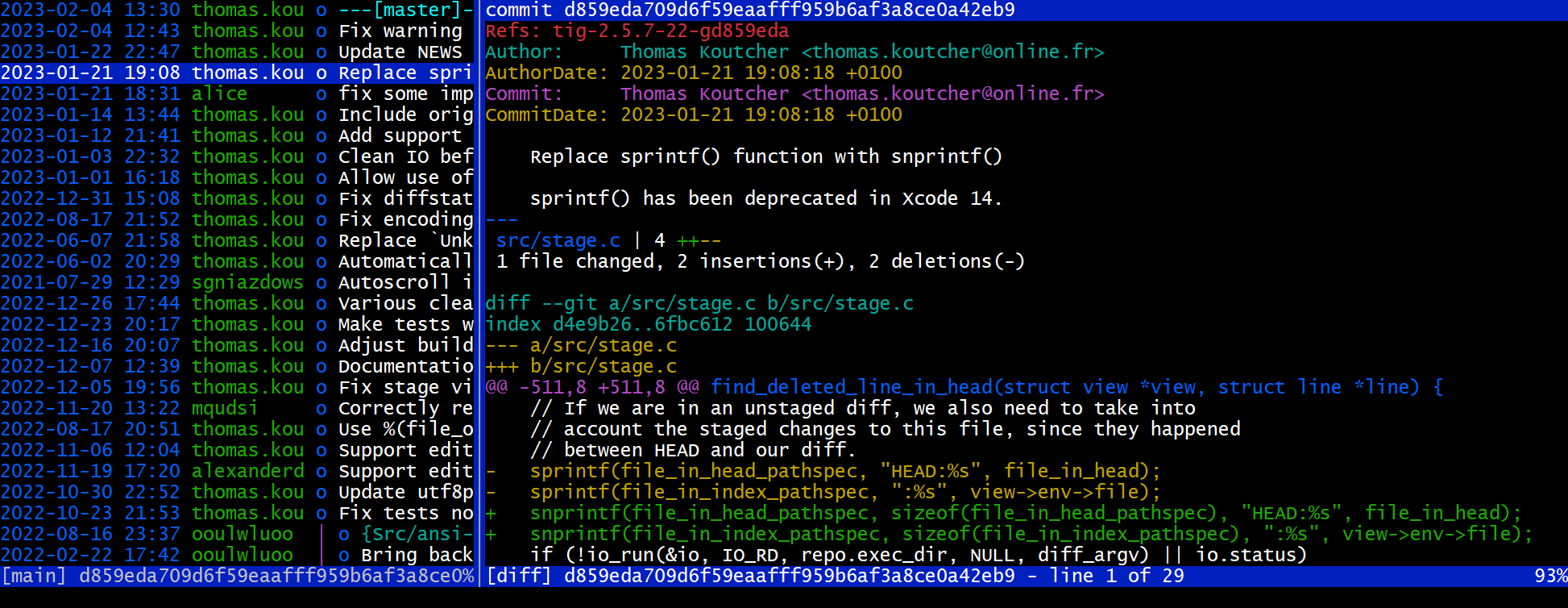
- Developer(s): jonas
- Initial release: April 11, 2006; 18 years ago
- Stable release: 2.5.8 / February 5, 2023; 2 years ago
- Repository: github.com/jonas/tig
- Written in: C
- Operating system: Cross-platform
- Type: VCS
- License: GNU General Public License, version 2
- Website: jonas.github.io/tig/

Tig is an ncurses-based text-mode interface for Git. It functions mainly as a Git repository browser, but it can also assist in staging changes for committing at the chunk level and can act as a pager for output from various Git commands.
