= List of American political podcasts =

This is a list of American political podcasts. They are listed in alphabetical order (A-Z).

== List ==
List of political podcasts
Podcast	Year	Host	Produced by	Ref
5-4	2020	Rhiannon Hamam, Michael Liroff, and Peter Shamshiri	Prologue Projects	
Advisory Opinions	2019	Sarah Isgur and David French	The Dispatch	
The Ben Shapiro Show		Ben Shapiro	The Daily Wire	
The Bulwark Podcast	2018	Tim Miller	The Bulwark	
Coast to Coast: The Conservative Podcast	2021	Jon Cohen	Coast to Coast Podcast Media	
Chapo Trap House	2016	Will Menaker, Matt Christman, Felix Biederman, Amber A'Lee Frost, and Virgil Texas		
The Dispatch Podcast	2019	Sarah Isgur, David French, Jonah Goldberg, and Stephen F. Hayes	The Dispatch	
Democracy Paradox Podcast	2020	Justin Kempf		
I Don't Speak German	2019	Daniel Harper and Jack Graham		
Keepin' It 1600	2016	Jon Favreau, Daniel Pfeiffer, Jon Lovett, and Tommy Vietor	The Ringer	
Know Your Enemy	2019	Matthew Sitman and Sam Adler-Bell		
Left, Right & Center		Josh Barro and Rich Lowry	KCRW	
Leftovers	2021	Ethan Klein and Hasan Piker		
Pantsuit Politics	2015	Sarah Stewart Holland and Beth Silvers	Studio D Podcast Production	
Pod Force One	2025	Miranda Devine	New York Post	
Pod Save America	2017	Jon Favreau, Daniel Pfeiffer, Jon Lovett, and Tommy Vietor	Crooked Media	
Pod Save the People	2017	DeRay Mckesson	Crooked Media	
Pod Save the World	2017	Tommy Vietor and Ben Rhodes	Crooked Media	
Politically Re-Active	2016	W. Kamau Bell and Hari Kondabolu	Independent	
QAA Podcast	2018	Travis View, Julian Feeld, Jake Rockatansky, Annie Kelly, Liv Agar, Brad Abrahams	Independent	
Relatable with Allie Beth Stuckey		Allie Beth Stuckey		
The Remnant with Jonah Goldberg		Jonah Goldberg	The Dispatch	
Start Making Sense	2015	Jon Wiener	The Nation	
This Land	2019	Rebecca Nagle	Crooked Media, Cadence13	
TrueAnon	2019	Brace Belden and Liz Franczak		
This is Gavin Newsom	2025	Gavin Newsom	iHeartMedia	
The Andy Beshear Podcast	2025	Andy Beshear		

== See also ==
- List of daily news podcasts
- Political podcast
