= Erin Gloria Ryan =

American screenwriter, speechwriter, and television producer

- Born: July 26, 1983 (age 43); Frederic, Wisconsin, U.S.
- Education: University of Notre Dame (BA)
- Occupations: Writer; podcast host; television writer
- Years active: 2011—present
- Political party: Democratic
- Spouse: Josh Rothenberger (m. 2020)
- Children: 2

Erin Gloria Ryan is an American writer, political opinion columnist, and podcaster. She is the host of Hysteria on the Crooked Media podcast network, and a contributor to The Daily Beast.

== Early life and education ==
Ryan was born in Frederic, Wisconsin, a small town in western Wisconsin. She studied English at the University of Notre Dame.

After graduating from college in 2005, she moved to the South Side of Chicago, initially as an AmeriCorps VISTA volunteer. In 2007, she began working for Merrill Lynch, where she remained until 2011.

== Career ==
In 2011, Ryan moved to New York City and began writing for the website Jezebel, also becoming a contributor to The New York Times and Playboy. She then became the managing editor at Jezebel, until she moved to Vocativ in 2015 to be the senior editor there. In 2016, she was hired as a senior editor by The Daily Beast, where she continues to be a regular contributor of political and cultural opinion pieces. Ryan has described her focus at The Daily Beast as "the intersection of politics, gender, society", and areas where "politics, womanhood, and feminism" touch.

Ryan was invited by Rob McElhenney to spend two months of 2018 writing for the television show It's Always Sunny In Philadelphia. She contributed writing to the thirteenth season of the series.

During 2017 and 2018, Ryan appeared frequently as a regular panelist on S. E. Cupp's CNN political panel show, S. E. Cupp Unfiltered. She has also appeared on other CNN news programs, including CNN Newsroom.

Ryan began podcasting in 2017, when she created a podcast called Girl Friday. Ryan later appeared as a guest on Chapo Trap House and the sixth episode of Pod Save America. Throughout 2017 and 2018, Ryan became a recurring guest on the Crooked Media podcasts Pod Save America and Lovett or Leave It. In June 2018, Ryan launched a podcast with Crooked Media called Hysteria which is co-hosted with Alyssa Mastromonaco. Hysteria is a politics and comedy podcast that seeks to center the voices of women, and also covers developments in popular culture. The podcast premiered at the top of the iTunes records chart, and was downloaded more than a million times in its first two months.
