= Pod Save the World =

American podcast

- Genre: Political podcast; Progressive talk radio
- Language: English

Cast and voices
- Hosted by: Tommy Vietor; Ben Rhodes

Production
- Length: 41–82 minutes

Publication
- Original release: February 2017
- Provider: Crooked Media

Related
- Related shows: Pod Save America; Pod Save the UK
- Website: crooked.com/podcast-series/pod-save-the-world

Pod Save the World is a weekly American foreign policy podcast produced and distributed by Crooked Media, and hosted by former White House National Security Council spokesman Tommy Vietor and Ben Rhodes, the former Deputy National Security Advisor. In each episode, Vietor and Rhodes discuss foreign policy and international relations.

While other Crooked Media podcasts tend to focus heavily on domestic issues within the United States, Pod Save the World discusses global issues and international relations, with a focus on civic involvement. Vietor describes the podcast as a "no bullshit" approach to global news that tries to make complicated issues seem relatable and simple to understand.

They promote political activism and encourage democracy through various platforms but their key initiative is Vote Save America. They are closely related to other Crooked Media podcasts such as Lovett or Leave It hosted by Jon Lovett.

== Format ==
The last 20–30 minutes of the episode, one of the hosts interviews a guest, usually a foreign policy expert or former government official. Notable guests have included former National Security Advisor Susan Rice, former White House Chief of Staff Denis McDonough, and US Senator and vice presidential candidate Tim Kaine. The podcast regularly is joined by journalists, activists, politicians, entertainers, and world leaders. Some of their best-known guests include former US President Barack Obama, former US President Joe Biden, and WNBA player and activist Renee Montgomery.

== Reception ==
It debuted at number two on the iTunes American podcasts chart on February 1, 2017, and it was ranked #65 on October 20, 2023. Salon named Pod Save the World as one of its "15 indispensable policy podcasts." Vogue called it one of spring 2017's best shows.

== See also ==
- Political podcast
