= The Cutting Room Floor =

The Cutting Room Floor may refer to:

- The cutting room floor, itself
- The Cutting Room Floor (album), by Over the Rhine
- The Cutting Room Floor (mixtape), by The Alchemist
- The Cutting Room Floor (website), a wiki devoted to documenting unused, removed, or region-altered content in video games
- Cutting Room Floor (album), a 2005 compilation album by British progressive rock band Kino
- The Cutting Room Floor (podcast), a fashion podcast hosted by Recho Omondi

== See also ==
- The Cutting Room (disambiguation)
