= Nikki Fancy =

American digital media producer

Nikki Fancy (born April 11, 1991) is an American digital media producer and former Head of Marketing at Crooked Media.

== Biography ==
Fancy grew up in Lexington, Massachusetts and has one sister, digital strategist Jenny Fancy.

== Career ==
She previously worked at Bkstg as the Head of Programming and at Maker Studios as Vice President of Programming Strategy and Operations and as Senior Director of Programming Strategy. She produced and helped launch the popular online series Epic Rap Battles of History.

In 2015, at age 23, she was included in Forbes' 2015 list of "30 Under 30", as the Senior Director of Programming Strategy at Maker Studios.
