= Keepin' It 1600 =

American political podcast (2016)

Keepin' it 1600
- Genre: Weekly political commentary
- Running time: 35–75 minutes
- Country of origin: United States
- Language: English
- Home station: The Ringer
- Hosted by: Jon Favreau, Dan Pfeiffer, Jon Lovett, Tommy Vietor
- Original release: March 2016 – December 2016
- Website: theringer.com/keepin-it-1600-podcast-politics-election-jon-favreau-dan-pfeiffer-220924af4c94#.ay8hhbvpg

Keepin' it 1600 was an American political podcast produced by The Ringer and hosted by former Barack Obama staffers Jon Favreau, Tommy Vietor, Jon Lovett, and Dan Pfeiffer. Its name is a reference to the saying "keep it one hundred" and the White House's address of 1600 Pennsylvania Avenue.

== History ==
The podcast began in March 2016 during the US presidential primaries with weekly episodes hosted by Favreau and Pfeiffer, and continued with twice weekly episodes through the 2016 United States presidential election and the first weeks following Trump's election. The show ended in December 2016, and was succeeded by Pod Save America through the hosts' new media company, Crooked Media.

The podcast aired as a livestream show on both Periscope and Facebook Live as part of The Ringer's coverage of the presidential debates, as well as on November 8, 2016, the night of the presidential election.

There was a crossover podcast with Chuck Todd for the 1947: Meet the Press Podcast in December 2016.

== Content ==
The podcast featured interviews with Democrats, Republicans, and journalists, including Savannah Guthrie, Alyssa Mastromonaco, Liz Meriwether, Tom Perez, Kal Penn, Jake Tapper, David Plouffe, Robert Gibbs, Keith Ellison, Ana Navarro, and Evan McMullin.

The show had a variety of running jokes, including the prevention of politically induced "bedwetting", a segment called "Says Who?", and advocacy of the belief that Jon Lovett is a "Straight Shooter Widely Respected on Both Sides".

== Reception ==
By election day, the show was averaging more than 400,000 viewers per episode. The podcast was named one of the '50 Best Podcasts of 2016' by The Atlantic and one of the 'seven best new podcasts of 2016' by GQ. Entertainment Weekly called it "the hottest political show of campaign season".

== Crooked Media and Pod Save America ==
Keepin' it 1600 ended in December 2016. Favreau, Lovett and Vietor formed their own company, Crooked Media, and started a new podcast called Pod Save America. The show airs twice weekly, with Favreau, Lovett and Vietor hosting a Tuesday show and Favreau and Pfeiffer hosting a Thursday show.

== See also ==
- Political podcast
