= Lovett or Leave It =

Political podcast hosted by Jon Lovett

- Genre: Political podcast; Progressive talk radio
- Language: English

Cast and voices
- Hosted by: Jon Lovett

Publication
- Original release: March 2017
- Provider: Crooked Media

Related
- Website: crooked.com/podcast-series/lovett-or-leave-it/

Lovett or Leave It is a weekly podcast hosted by speechwriter and screenwriter Jon Lovett. It is produced by Lee Eisenberg and distributed by Crooked Media. The theme song is by the band Sure Sure. Lovett has described the show as a way to talk about politics in plain language and has called the discussion "very loose."

== Format ==
Lovett or Leave It is a live panel show, hosted by Jon Lovett, and with guests from journalism, comedy and politics. Topics in the news from the previous week are discussed by the panel, with a focus on U.S politics.

Pre-2020, the show would often open with an interview with a guest, often a Democratic politician, who doesn't join the panel discussion. Then-Colorado Governor John Hickenlooper, former Mayor of Los Angeles Antonio Villaraigosa, actor Rainn Wilson, and South Bend, Indiana mayor and 2020 Democratic presidential candidate Pete Buttigieg have all been interviewed. Occasionally though, guests such as House Intelligence Committee Chair Adam Schiff stay on and join the panel.

Panel guests have included comedians Sarah Silverman, Brett Gelman, Ira Madison III and Paul Scheer, screenwriter Wil Wheaton and journalists Lauren Duca, Ronan Farrow and Katie Nolan.

The show was usually held in Los Angeles, California, at the Hollywood Improv, before moving to remote locations due to the COVID-19 pandemic.

Since the beginning of the pandemic, Lovett would begin with an opening monologue, with a guest critiques. Guests have included Kumail Nanjiani, Ike Barinholtz, Adam Conover, and Larry Wilmore.

The show has featured month-long themes including "Back in the Closet," "Homestretch," "Back in the Closet-Elect," and most recently, "Vax to the Future." Viewers have submitted song ideas to coincide with the various themes.

Transcripts of the show have been available to researchers upon request.

== Regular segments ==
- "What a Week!" is the opening segment where the panel discusses the previous week's news.
- "OK, Stop", in which a clip of an interview or speech is played, and panelists can pause the clip to offer commentary about its content.
- "The Rant Wheel", in which a topic for discussion is chosen randomly from a set pre-selected by Lovett or suggested by the audience.
- "There's Just Like, So Much Going On", in which a topic that may not have received much news coverage is discussed.
- "Too Stupid to Be True", where a member of the audience tries to pick whether quotes offered by the panel are real or fake.
- "The Russia Stuff", a two-minute segment where the panel discusses the newest developments in the Trump-Russia investigation.
- "Gay News", in which Lovett and a guest deliver headlines and jokes related to LGBT celebrities and culture.

== See also ==
- Political podcast
- Pod Save America
