= The Cutting Room (disambiguation) =

The Cutting Room is a music venue.

The Cutting Room or Cutting Room may also refer to:

- The Cutting Room Studios, Commercial recording studio in New York City
- Cutting Room (film), a 2006 American horror/comedy film
- The Cutting Room (film), a 2015 British film
- The Cutting Room (novel), a 2002 Scottish novel
- The Cutting Room (TV show), see List of programs broadcast by BiteTV

== See also ==
- The Cutting Room Floor (disambiguation)
