= Cody Keenan =

American speechwriter

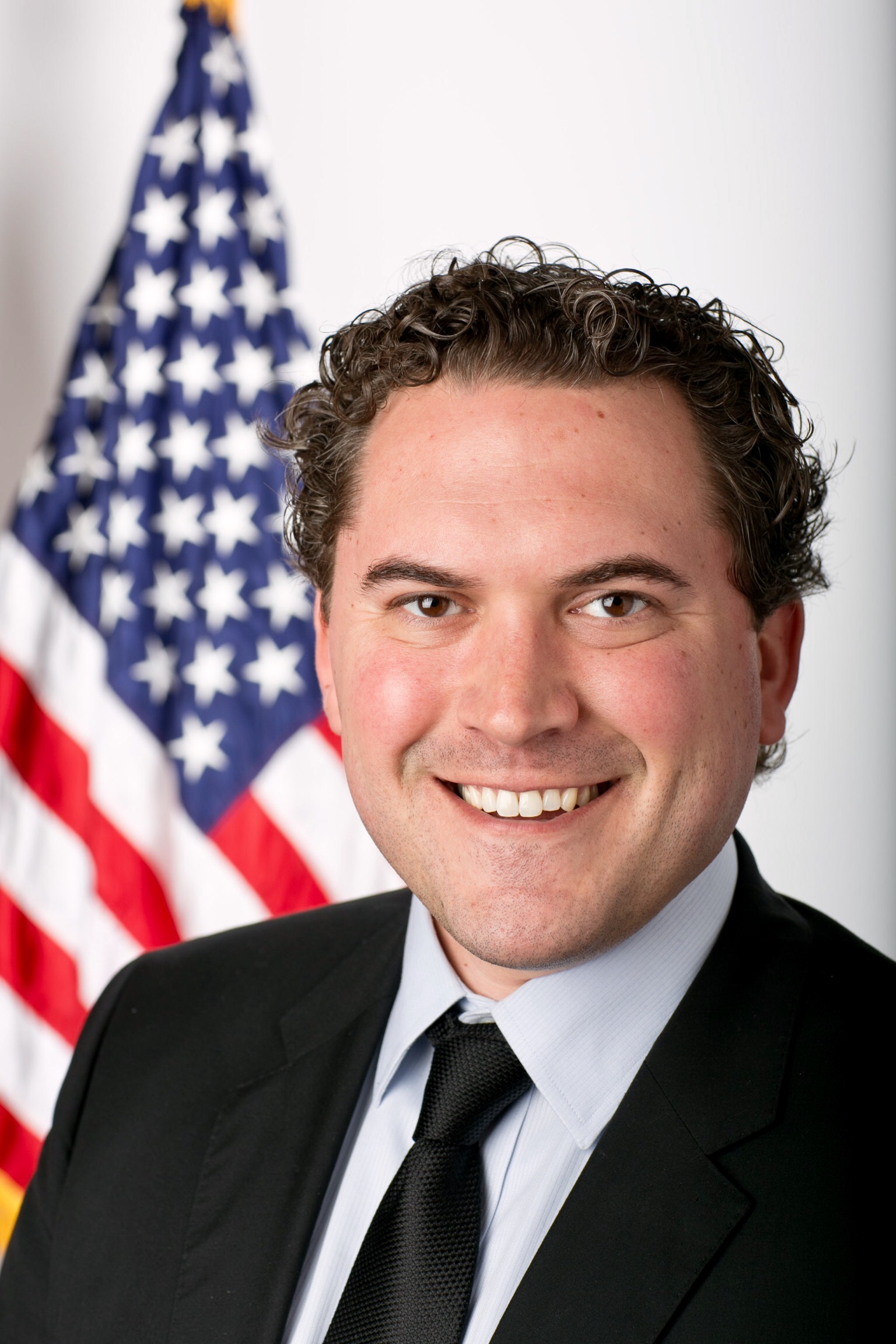

White House Director of Speechwriting
- In office March 1, 2013 – January 20, 2017
- President: Barack Obama
- Preceded by: Jon Favreau
- Succeeded by: Stephen Miller

Personal details
- Born: October 14, 1980 (age 46) Chicago, Illinois, U.S.
- Party: Democratic
- Spouse: Kristen Bartoloni
- Education: Northwestern University (BA); Harvard University (MPP)

Cody Keenan is an American political advisor and speechwriter who served as the director of speechwriting for President Barack Obama. Keenan studied political science at Northwestern University. After graduation, he worked in the U.S. senate office of Ted Kennedy, before studying for a master's in public policy at the Harvard Kennedy School. After graduation, he took a full-time position on Barack Obama's presidential campaign in 2008. In 2009, he assumed the position of deputy director of speechwriting. After Jon Favreau left the White House in 2013, Keenan took over as director of speechwriting.

== Early life and education ==
Keenan's parents were both advertising executives who lived in Lake View, Chicago, before moving to Evanston, Illinois, Wilmette, Illinois, and later Ridgefield, Fairfield County, Connecticut, where Keenan attended high school. Keenan attended Northwestern University, where he majored in political science, graduating in 2002. Keenan is a member of the Sigma Chi fraternity and recipient of its Significant Sig award.

== Career history ==
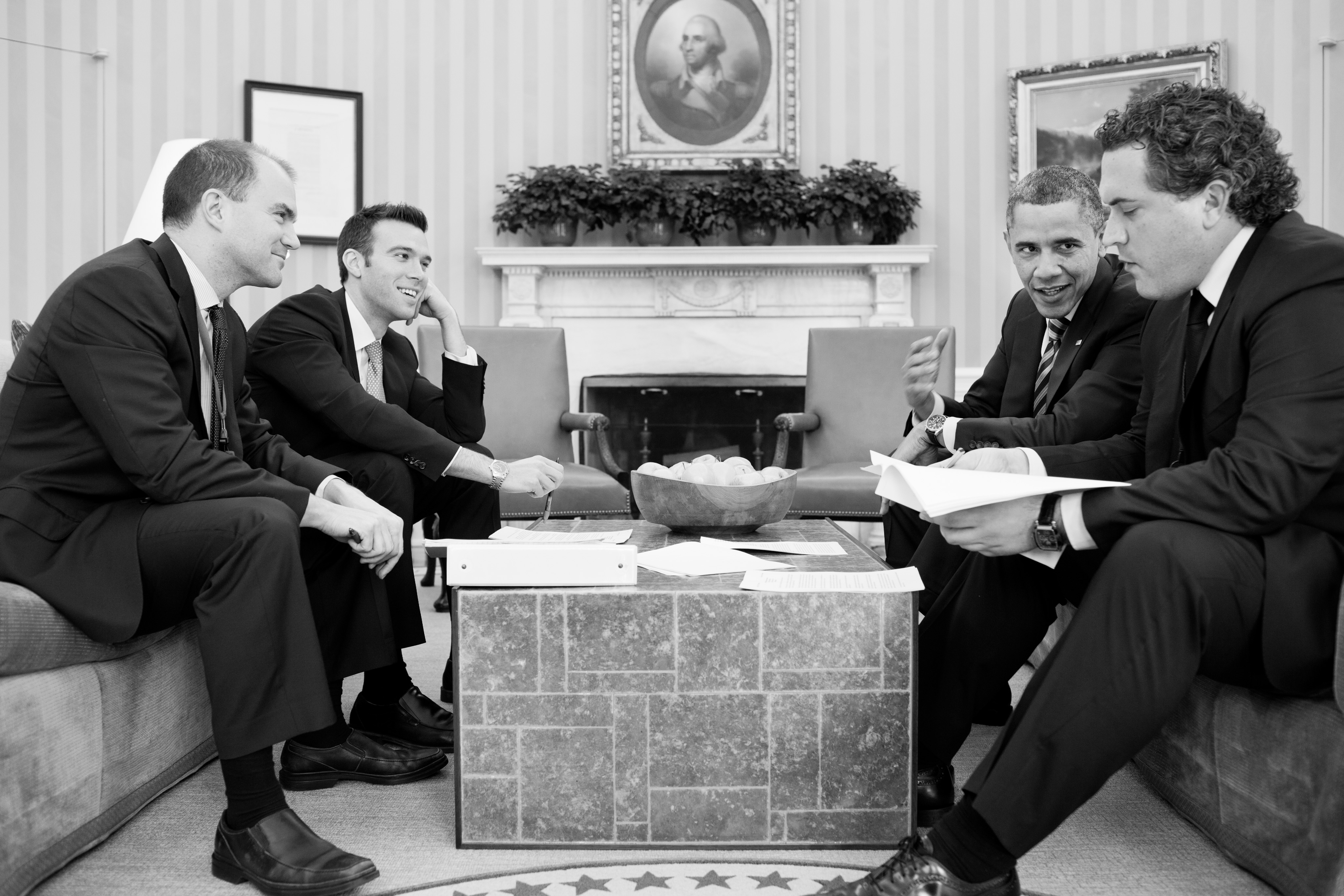
Keenan works with speechwriters Ben Rhodes, and Jon Favreau, with President Obama in the Oval Office in February 2013

=== Early career ===
Keenan's political career began with an internship in the mailroom of Ted Kennedy's senate office in 2003, before going on to become the senator's legislative aide. After a stint as a staff assistant for the Senate Health, Education, Labor and Pensions Committee, Keenan took a master's degree in public policy at the John F. Kennedy School of Government, studying speechwriting and delivery under Steve Jarding. In 2007, Keenan took a summer internship in speechwriting on Barack Obama's presidential campaign, working under Jon Favreau, before returning to the Kennedy School to complete the second year of his studies. He remained involved in the campaign during the year, flying to Iowa during the Christmas break to assist in preparation for the Iowa caucuses. After Hillary Clinton conceded in June 2008, Keenan returned as a full-time staffer on Obama's presidential campaign.

=== White House staffer ===
After the election, Keenan continued in the role as deputy director of speechwriting, working on a speech about the Edward M. Kennedy Serve America Act, the president's eulogy for Ted Kennedy in 2009, and the president's address after the shooting of Gabrielle Giffords in 2011, among other speeches. He appeared in a visual gag for the 2009 White House Correspondents' Dinner, dressed as a pirate. Prior to Favreau's departure from the White House in March 2013, Keenan took the lead on writing the State of the Union Address in January 2013.

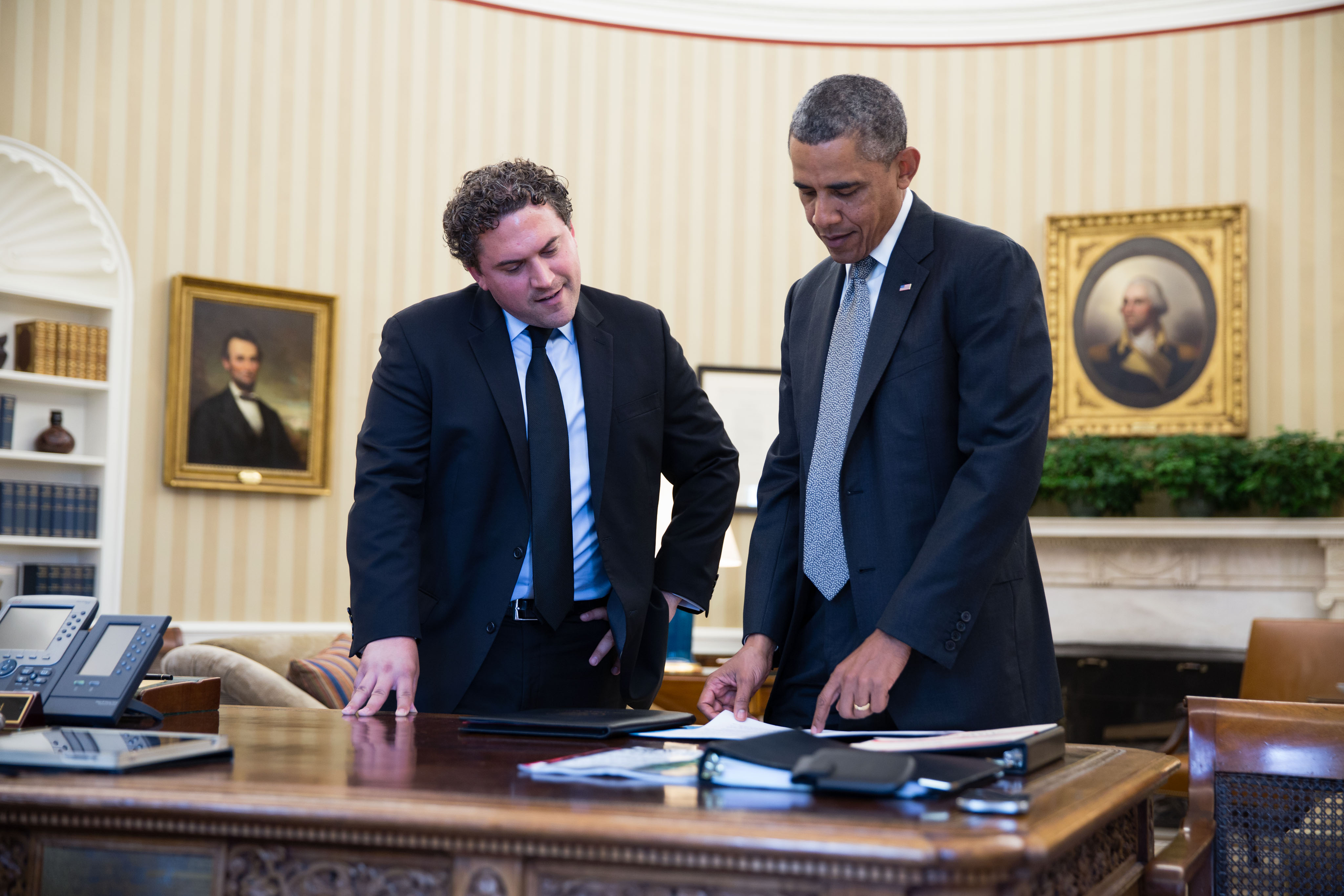
Barack Obama with Cody Keenan in the Oval Office, July 23, 2013

In March 2013, Keenan was promoted to White House director of speechwriting, with overall responsibility for all speechwriting. Writing in The New York Times, Michael S. Schmidt noted that unlike Favreau, "who was known for his ability to write lofty, big-picture speeches ... Mr. Keenan focuses far more on individual, hard-work stories as parables for what is difficult but still possible in America." In 2015, Keenan wrote the speech delivered by Obama to mark the 50th anniversary of Bloody Sunday. After leaving the White House in 2017, Keenan spent several more years writing with Barack Obama.

In June 2015, Keenan gave a commencement address to the Robert F. Wagner Graduate School of Public Service. In June 2018, Keenan delivered the convocation speech at his alma mater, Northwestern University.

== Writing ==
Keenan is the author of a New York Times Best Seller, Grace: President Obama and Ten Days in the Battle for America (2022), which tells the story of “ten days of the presidency, in June 2015, when a racist massacre and two impending Supreme Court decisions put the character of our country on the line, and a President's words could bring the nation together or tear it apart.” In January 2023, the book was nominated for an NAACP Image Award for Outstanding Literary Work – Nonfiction.

== Other work ==
Keenan is a partner at the speechwriting firm Fenway Strategies, a visiting professor at Northwestern University, and sits on the board of the Edward M. Kennedy Institute for the United States Senate.

== Personal life ==
Keenan married Kristen Bartoloni in 2016. Bartoloni worked as deputy research director in the Obama White House. The story of their courtship and marriage was included in the CNN Films documentary The End: Inside the Last Days of the Obama White House. In the film, Keenan says he and Bartoloni met during her first day on the job which he describes as "still the best day I've had at the White House." Keenan says he asked Bartoloni to go out with him three times before she agreed. In 2020, Bartoloni gave birth to a daughter named Grace.
