= Alyssa Mastromonaco =

American businesswoman and government official

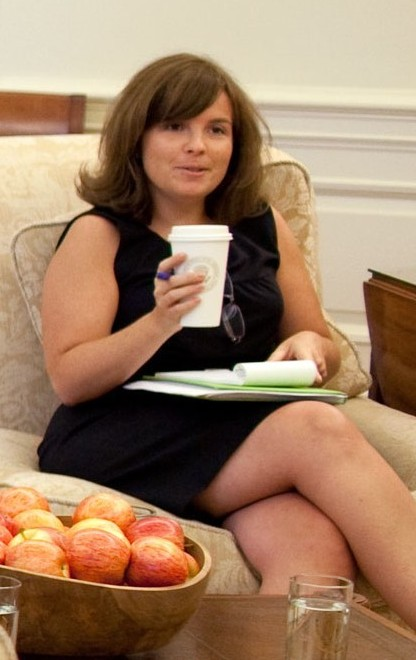
- Mastromonaco at the White House in 2009

White House Deputy Chief of Staff for Operations
- In office January 27, 2011 – May 22, 2014
- President: Barack Obama
- Preceded by: Jim Messina
- Succeeded by: Anita Decker Breckenridge

Personal details
- Born: Alyssa Mende Mastromonaco; February 22, 1976 (age 50) Rhinebeck, New York, U.S.
- Party: Democratic
- Spouse: David Krone (m. 2013)
- Education: University of Wisconsin, Madison (BA)

Alyssa Mende Mastromonaco (born February 22, 1976) is an American author, podcaster, spokeswoman, and former government official. She served as White House Deputy Chief of Staff for operations in the administration of President Barack Obama from 2011 to 2014. She was the youngest woman to hold that position. She was later President of Global Communications Strategy & Talent at A&E Networks and the chief operating officer of Vice Media. She has also been a contributing editor at Marie Claire magazine. Since 2017, Mastromonaco has been a podcaster with Crooked Media.

== Early life and education ==
Mastromonaco grew up in Rhinebeck, New York. Her father was a business consultant and her mother was a high school lunch aide.

In 1994, she graduated from Rhinebeck High School. During high school Mastromonaco worked in various jobs, including her first job as a checkout person at a grocery store called Kilmer's IGA.

Mastromonaco went to the University of Vermont for two years, majoring in French with a minor in Japanese. She then transferred to the University of Wisconsin-Madison, where she graduated with a Bachelor of Arts in political science in 1998.

== Career ==
The summer after her sophomore year of college, after seeing then-Congressman Bernie Sanders speak on campus, Mastromonaco was hired by Philip Fiermonte to work as an intern for Sanders in his Burlington, Vermont, district office. At that time, Sanders was campaigning for his fourth term in the United States House of Representatives. Mastromonaco has said that the experience inspired her to work in government after seeing how it was possible to help people doing constituent work on a grassroots level. Although she had transferred to Wisconsin to study French, the summer working for Sanders shifted her passion from studying French and Japanese to studying political science. She cites Fiermonte as a great mentor during an important time in her life. The next summer, Mastromonaco was invited to work for Sanders in Washington, D.C.

After college Mastromonaco wanted to continue working in government but couldn't find a job, so she worked as a real-estate investment-trust paralegal, which she said was instrumental in teaching her how to work well as part of a team. The job was in the World Trade Center.

In 2000, Mastromonaco moved to Boston and got her first job in politics as a staff assistant to Senator John Kerry. For a short time, after 9/11, she worked at a Republican lobbyist group, Richard Berman's American Beverage Institute, as director of membership. In 2002, Mastromonaco was hired as Press Secretary for Congressman Rick Boucher of Virginia, but in December 2002 went back to work for Kerry. In 2004, Mastromonaco was hired as the director of scheduling for Kerry's presidential campaign.

=== Obama administration ===
Starting in February 2004, Mastromonaco joined the then Illinois State Senator Barack Obama's campaign during his run for United States Senate. She was hired as Director of Scheduling. The team who made up that office included Jon Favreau, Tommy Vietor, Robert Gibbs, and Pete Rouse. She then worked in Obama's Senate office.

From 2007 to 2008, Mastromonaco was Political Director for Obama's Political Action Committee (PAC), Hopefund, during the 2006 midterm elections. The mission of the PAC was to teach young people who had no experience in the political process how to be field and community organizers. Following Obama's announcement in February 2007, Mastromonaco served as Director of Scheduling and Advance for Barack Obama's presidential campaign.

In January 2011, she was appointed deputy chief of staff for operations. In November 2011, The New Republic magazine listed Mastromonaco on its "2011 List Issue" as being one of Washington's most powerful, least famous people. Along with Nancy-Ann DeParle, who was White House Deputy Chief of Staff for Policy, it was the first time a presidential administration had two women deputies in power. She was notable for her long institutional memory, the ability to understand logistics, and her low-key approach to the position.

In May 2014, Mastromonaco left her position as deputy chief of staff for operations. She was replaced by Anita Decker Breckenridge.

=== Post-White House ===
In June 2014, Mastromonaco was hired as a contributing editor at Marie Claire. In January 2015, Mastromonaco joined Vice Media as chief operating officer. She left Vice after two years for its parent company, A&E Networks. She left this role in 2018.

Mastromonaco's first book, Who Thought This Was a Good Idea? And Other Questions You Should Have Answers to When You Work in the White House, was published by Twelve in March 2017. Her second book, So...Here's the Thing, was released in 2019. Lauren Oyler contributed to Mastromonaco's writing on both books.

In 2017, Mastromonaco became a contributor to Crooked Media. There, she co-hosts the podcast Hysteria and appears on other Crooked Media podcasts.

In 2022, Mastromonaco was named President of BedBy8, a production company launched by George Stephanopolous and Ali Wentworth.

== Personal life ==
In November 2013, Mastromonaco married David Krone, who had worked with Senate Minority Leader Harry Reid and was his chief of staff from 2008 to 2015. They were married by Justice Elena Kagan at the Supreme Court. As of 2015, the couple live in the Tribeca neighborhood of New York City.

== Boards and memberships ==
- HeadCount.org, Board of Directors
- The Kennedy Center, Board of Trustees
- University of Wisconsin–Madison, Department of Political Science, Board of Visitors

== Published books ==
- Who Thought This Was a Good Idea?, Hachette Book Group, 2017, ISBN 978-1-4555-8822-0, ISBN 978-1-4555-8821-3
- So Here's the Thing . . .: Notes on Growing Up, Getting Older, and Trusting Your Gut, Grand Central Publishing, 2019, ISBN 978-1-5387-3155-0

Political offices
Preceded by Jim Messina	White House Deputy Chief of Staff for Operations; 2011–2014	Succeeded by Anita Decker Breckenridge
