= Louis Virtel =

American television writer and podcast host (born 1986)

- Born: August 4, 1986 (age 40)
- Education: University of Iowa
- Occupations: Television writer; comedian; pop culture commentator; podcast host
- Years active: 2009–present

Louis Virtel (/ˈluːɪs vɜːrˈtɛl/; born August 4, 1986) is an American television writer, comedian, pop culture commentator, and podcast host. He first rose to prominence after appearing on a 2015 episode of Jeopardy!, where a clip of him answering a clue while emphatically snapping went viral. Virtel has since written for publications such as Time, Billboard, and Vulture. As of 2026, he is a writer for Jimmy Kimmel Live!, and has contributed to telecasts hosted by Jimmy Kimmel, such as the 72nd Primetime Emmy Awards and the 95th and 96th Academy Awards ceremonies. Virtel has also co-hosted the Crooked Media podcast Keep It! since 2018.

== Early and personal life ==
Virtel was born August 4, 1986. He grew up with a large family in Lemont, Illinois and graduated from Lemont High School in 2004. Virtel received a bachelor's degree in journalism and theater from the University of Iowa in 2008.

Virtel, who has been openly gay throughout his adulthood, has stated that growing up in Lemont proved alienating, and that he did not realize that living as an openly gay person was possible until meeting a gay neighbor in his teenage years.

== Career ==
While in college, Virtel obtained an internship at The Advocate. After graduation, he moved to Los Angeles, California in 2009, where he wrote for publications such as Hollywood Life and Movieline. In March 2011, Virtel began writing television recaps for TVLine, including coverage of the 13th season of Big Brother and the 11th season of The Apprentice. During this time, he also hosted the Logo webseries Weeklings!, as well as a show called Verbal Vogueing that appeared on his personal YouTube channel. He also performed comedy. In 2012, he became the West Coast entertainment editor for the pop culture website AfterElton, which would later rebrand to The Backlot. His success with Verbal Vogueing also led to him being hired by the entertainment website HitFix (Note: HitFix pieces now redirect to Uproxx; Virtel's contributions are listed under this site.) to host the webseries The Snap. In 2014, Virtel began writing for the television show Billy on the Street.

=== Game show appearances ===
Virtel is an avid trivia enthusiast and began appearing on game shows in 2014, when he competed on a January 28 episode of the Game Show Network program The Chase and won $38,000. In 2015, he appeared on a Jeopardy! episode that aired on May 8; his brother, Jim Virtel, had previously appeared on the show in 2012. Though he lost the actual game to contestant Andrew Haringer, a video of Virtel aggressively snapping after correctly answering a Daily Double clue pertaining to Arthur Miller's play The Crucible quickly went viral, often being shared in the form of GIFs. Despite the notoriety Virtel achieved for this moment, he has expressed regret that he never explicitly disclosed his sexual orientation during the episode, since he felt his visibility as a gay man would have been a comfort to adolescents growing up in areas with small gay populations. For his 2015 appearance on the show, Virtel was named one of the 7 most famous LGBTQ Jeopardy! contestants by LGBTQ Nation in 2022.

In January 2016, a GIF of Virtel's Jeopardy! snap was used by the House Republican Conference to promote their Snapchat-based coverage of an upcoming State of the Union address, with the image captioned "#SnapOfTheUnion". Virtel vocally disapproved of this decision, denouncing his likeness being used by the party on Twitter, in a HitFix essay, and in a Slate interview. In his essay for HitFix, Virtel explained his dismay by writing:

Nothing about representing myself on Jeopardy! with excitement, self-possession, and pride has anything to do with the GOP's ideals, and it is borderline traumatizing to see my image associated with their horrifying, regressive shambles of a party. Every fearful, closeted kid I knew growing up in suburban Illinois had one thing in common: ignorant, blindly adherent Republican parents.

=== Further career ===
After his Jeopardy! appearance, Virtel continued writing for television and digital media. In 2017, he wrote for the short-lived TV Land show Throwing Shade. In March 2018, he began publishing recaps of the 16th season of American Idol for Vulture. In addition to his HitFix contributions, which continued until 2016, he has also published pieces in Billboard and Time. Since 2018, Virtel has hosted the Crooked Media podcast Keep It!. Virtel appeared on an episode of Who Wants to Be a Millionaire that aired on March 13, 2019. On June 26, 2023, Virtel appeared as a guest host on the television channel Turner Classic Movies, where he helped present the 1995 film The Celluloid Closet and five additional films shown in the documentary.

As of 2026, Virtel is working as a writer for Jimmy Kimmel Live!. He occasionally appears in-person on the show in a segment called "Virtel It Like It Is". As a result of his affiliation with Jimmy Kimmel, he has also contributed to various awards broadcasts Kimmel has hosted, including the 72nd Primetime Emmy Awards, as well as the 95th and 96th Academy Awards. Virtel confirmed on an episode of Keep It! that his contributions to the 96th Academy Awards included a joke about French actor Gérard Depardieu eating his own vomit. He earned a Primetime Emmy Award nomination for Outstanding Writing for a Variety Special as part of its writing staff.

In 2024, the Jeopardy! spinoff Pop Culture Jeopardy! premiered on Amazon Prime Video, with Virtel serving as a writer for the show. For his work as a part of the Pop Culture Jeopardy! team, Virtel won the award for Quiz and Audience Participation show at the 77th Writers Guild of America Awards. Virtel also served as a writer for the 31st Screen Actors Guild Awards.

Virtel served as a member of the Jimmy Kimmel Live! writing staff during the show's brief production suspension, which occurred following right-wing criticism of a comment Kimmel made during a monologue in which he speculated on the beliefs of conservative activist Charlie Kirk's shooter. The action was widely characterized by journalists as a retaliatory measure against Kimmel—who has consistently been critical of Donald Trump—by Federal Communications Commission (FCC) chairman Brendan Carr, who had first been appointed to the agency's Board of Commissioners by Trump in 2017. (Note: Attributed to multiple references:) Virtel responded to this matter on a September 2025 episode of Keep It!, telling guest host Guy Branum, "I think joke-telling is often the fastest way to tell the truth, and tell the truth in a way people remember. But when it comes to the word 'fascism,' actually, I feel like we all just need to say, 'No. Bad.' There’s nothing to say. There’s no irony to put on this." Virtel earned a nomination for Outstanding Writing for a Variety Series at the 78th Primetime Emmy Awards for his contributions to Jimmy Kimmel Live! that year.

In July 2025, fellow television writer Ira Madison III, with whom Virtel had hosted Keep It! since his arrival on the show, departed his co-host position, with no immediate replacement having been announced. Throughout the following year, Virtel hosted the show with a rotating slate of guest hosts. Television personality and fashion designer Nina Parker, who frequently made appearances during the interim period, was ultimately selected as the show's permanent co-host; she made her official debut as such on July 8, 2026.
