= Recho Omondi =

American podcaster and designer (born 1987)

- Born: March 2, 1987 (age 39); Nowhere, Oklahoma, U.S.
- Education: University of Illinois Urbana-Champaign; Savannah College of Art and Design (B.A.)
- Occupations: Fashion designer; podcaster
- Years active: 2013–present
- Known for: The Cutting Room Floor
- Label: Omondi

Recho Omondi (born March 2, 1987) is an American fashion designer and podcaster. After graduating from the Savannah College of Art and Design, she moved to New York City and founded the ready-to-wear fashion label Omondi in the mid-2010s, which she shut down in 2020. She launched the fashion interview podcast The Cutting Room Floor in 2018, which, as of 2025, is released through Patreon. Several of her interviews on the podcast, including those with stylist Law Roach, blogger Leandra Medine, and designer Steve Madden, went viral on social media in the 2020s.

== Early life ==
Recho Omondi was born on March 2, 1987 in Nowhere, Oklahoma to Kenyan immigrant parents. Her family frequently moved and she was raised throughout the Midwest in Kansas, Illinois, and Michigan, also briefly living in Georgia. She also spent her childhood summers with family in Nairobi, Mombasa, and Kisumu. She became interested in fashion as a child due to her older sister's affinity for fashion magazines, including Elle, Vogue, and Interview, and the Canadian television series Fashion File. She also did ballet and participated in dance competitions as a child, where, according to her, she was often the only black girl competing.

Omondi graduated from Champaign Central High School in Champaign, Illinois, where, according to her, she was voted "Most Outspoken". She briefly attended the University of Illinois as a pre-med student, where she dated football running back Rashard Mendenhall. She later transferred to the Savannah College of Art and Design, graduating in 2011 with a Bachelor of Arts in fashion design and pattern making, after which she moved to New York City.

== Career ==
=== Design ===
Before starting her own brand, Omondi worked in retail at Barneys, as a freelance pattern designer for Calvin Klein, Gap, Kimberly Ovitz, and Suno, and as a full-time pattern designer for Theory. While working as a nanny in Harlem and after receiving a $15 thousand investment, she launched her self-named, ready-to-wear fashion brand, Omondi, out of Bedford–Stuyvesant, Brooklyn in around 2013. (Note: Publications have variously written that Omondi was launched in 2013, 2014, and 2015.) She has described her brand as being based on her Kenyan heritage. In order to finance the brand, she called friends of hers to ask for money. Her first collection, 001, was released with a lookbook and her second, 002, premiered with a fashion show. She released her third collection, 003, in February 2017, which included embroidered sweatshirts bearing the N-word. The sweatshirts became popular online after one was worn by Issa Rae's character on the season two premiere of Rae's HBO series, Insecure, which premiered in July 2017. She closed the brand in 2020 during the COVID-19 pandemic.

=== Podcasting ===
Omondi launched the biweekly fashion interview podcast The Cutting Room Floor in 2018. Following its launch, guests on the podcasts included designers Christopher John Rogers, Phoebe Philo, Martine Rose, Peter Do, Heron Preston, Lana Johnson, Mara Hoffman, and Ava Nope, businessman Mickey Drexler, model Bethann Hardison, modeling agent Mina White, creative director Ibrahem Hasan, journalists Cindi Leive and Teri Agins, YouTuber Luke Meagher, and bloggers Diet Prada. It was briefly the most listened-to arts podcast on Spotify prior to 2021.

In June 2021, during the podcast's third season, Omondi began exclusively releasing The Cutting Room Floor on Patreon. After Leandra Medine, founder of the blog Man Repeller, stepped down from her head role at the blog in June 2020 following allegations of racism within the company, she appeared on The Cutting Room Floor in July 2021 in the first of an intended two-part episode titled "The Tanning of America". It became widely discussed online due to Medine stating that, until the George Floyd protests in 2020, she believed that she had grown up poor despite living on the wealthy Upper East Side and attending Ramaz School, a private Jewish day school. Omondi's comments in the episode about Jewish involvement in American slavery, Medine being a "Jewish-American princess", and Jewish people getting nose jobs and changing their last names in order to assimilate, also received backlash and were criticized online as antisemitic. The episode was later edited to exclude Omondi's comments and she soon issued an apology to the Jewish community, calling her statements "crass and reductive"; she announced the following month that she would not be releasing the episode's second part.

Throughout 2024, Omondi conducted interviews with rapper Yasiin Bey and stylist Law Roach for The Cutting Room Floor, both of which found popularity online. She also started a YouTube channel for the podcast in January 2024. According to Danya Issawi of The Cut, The Cutting Room Floor had become "one of fashion's most popular podcasts" by 2025 due to Omondi's "honest and straightforward" interviewing style. She interviewed fashion designer Steve Madden on a May 2025 episode of the podcast, where he discussed his imprisonment for securities fraud and criticized international tariffs imposed by President Donald Trump. Clips of the interview went viral on both TikTok and YouTube, with commenters widely praising Madden; online searches for Madden and the stock price of his namesake fashion brand rose soon after. She also appeared as the moderator for the first episode of Instagram's Ask It Anyway interview series in June 2025, which featured rapper Tyler, the Creator.

In August 2025, Omondi posted a job listing on LinkedIn for The Cutting Room Floor's full-time office coordinator, which was described as combining the roles of a personal assistant, bookings administrator, and studio coordinator. It prompted social media backlash against her, including from writer Ira Madison III, due to its listed yearly salary of $55 thousand before tax with no benefits, which users widely criticized as too low. Omondi stated in a TikTok livestream soon thereafter that the job was intended for candidates who wanted "to come to New York and hustle in the early years of their careers", but later froze the job listing and stated in a voice note for her Patreon subscribers that she had "made a mess out of this unintentionally".

By 2026, The Cutting Room Floor was in the top one percent of Patreon-exclusive podcasts. In June 2026, Omondi signed a three-year marketing and production partnership with Patreon.
