= Nowhere, Oklahoma =

Unincorporated community in Oklahoma, US

- Unincorporated community
- Location within Oklahoma
- Coordinates: 35°09′33″N 98°26′32″W
- Country: United States
- State: Oklahoma
- County: Caddo
- Elevation: 1,345 ft (410 m)
- Time zone: UTC-6 (Central (CST))
  - Summer (DST): UTC-5 (CDT)
- Area code: 405
- GNIS feature ID: 1718738

Nowhere is an unincorporated community in Caddo County, Oklahoma, United States. Nowhere is located at the southeast end of Fort Cobb Reservoir, 5.5 miles (8.9 km) south-southwest of Albert and 14 miles (23 km) northwest of Anadarko.

Nowhere is at the intersection of E1280 Road and County Street 2550. The area consists of a gas station, bait house, and water tower (according to owner Jerry Howell, the only residents besides him are his daughter and grandson).

Podcaster Recho Omondi was born in the community.
