= Crooked Media =

American political podcast network

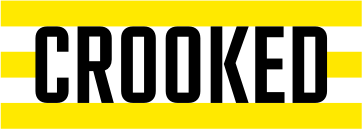
- Website type: News and political commentary
- Available in: English
- Headquarters: Los Angeles, California
- Country of origin: United States
- Founders: Jon Favreau (Co-founder); Jon Lovett (Co-founder); Tommy Vietor (Co-founder)
- Key people: Lucinda Treat (CEO); Michele Rosette (CFO); Madeleine Haeringer (EVP, Programming & News)
- Industry: Media production
- Website: crooked.com
- Launched: January 2017; 9 years ago

Crooked Media is an American progressive political media company. It was founded in 2017 by Jon Favreau, Jon Lovett, and Tommy Vietor, all former top Barack Obama staffers and co-hosts of the Keepin' It 1600 podcast. Dan Pfeiffer, also a former Obama employee, co-hosts their flagship podcast, Pod Save America.

The company's offerings encompass a network of podcasts; a news and opinion website; live shows and tours; and a social media and live streaming presence. It aims to foster open conversation between those with center-left political leanings and support grassroots activism and political participation.

The company's flagship podcast, Pod Save America, airs thrice weekly and averages more than 1.5 million listeners an episode. In Fall 2018, four Pod Save America one-hour specials aired on HBO. By November of its first year, the podcast had been downloaded more than 120 million times, and 175 million times by February 2018. By 2024, the podcast counted over 20 million monthly listeners.

The company is headquartered in Los Angeles, California.

== History ==
Favreau, Lovett, Vietor, and Pfeiffer hosted The Ringer's Keepin' It 1600 political podcast from March 2016 until December 2016.

In 2016, Favreau, Lovett, and Vietor started podcasting and activism on a full-time basis. The three formed the Crooked Media company in January 2017 and launched a new podcast called Pod Save America the following month. Pfeiffer opted not to join the company, and instead to co-host the Thursday edition of the show. Crooked Media is named after a favorite term used by Donald Trump. When asked whether he thought Crooked Media was a 'media company', Favreau said, "I don't know if it's a political movement or a media company".

The company announced a major expansion in October 2017 with the launch of Crooked.com, a text journalism site helmed by Editor-In-Chief Brian Beutler, a former New Republic senior editor. The expansion introduced the "Crooked Contributors" network, a group of progressive journalists, activists, organizers, policy experts, campaign veterans, and comedians who would be featured in podcasts, videos, and articles produced by the company.

The company uses advertising revenue to fund the business.

In February 2026, the company announced an agreement with MS NOW to air a weekly compilation program, Crooked on MS NOW, beginning on February 28.

== Podcasts ==
Crooked Media produces and distributes podcasts with numerous hosts, focusing on news and politics.

=== Pod Save America ===
Pod Save America is a thrice weekly progressive political podcast. On Tuesdays, it is hosted by Favreau, Vietor, and Lovett, and, on Fridays, it is hosted by Favreau and Pfeiffer. Pod Save America explicitly aims to encourage its listeners to engage in activism and political persuasion.

Pod Save America has run a number of special series and mini-series. For example, Tommy Vietor hosted a series on the 2020 Iowa Democratic presidential caucuses, and Dan Pfeiffer and Alyssa Mastromonaco hosted a series on the vice presidential candidate selection process.

=== Pod Save the People ===
Hosted by organizer and activist DeRay Mckesson, Pod Save the People "explores social justice, culture, politics – and the various ways they all collide".

=== Pod Save the World ===
Hosted by Vietor and former Deputy National Security Advisor Ben Rhodes, Pod Save the World discusses foreign policy and international relations.

=== Lovett or Leave It ===
Hosted by Lovett, a former speech and joke writer for President Obama. Lovett or Leave It is a recording of a weekly live show and features the eponymous host dissecting the news with a panel of guests. The show features a variety of games and one-on-one interviews centering on the week's news and American politics.

=== Strict Scrutiny ===
The law podcast "Strict Scrutiny" follows the United States Supreme Court while "Hot Take" covers climate issues. The hosts are Leah Litman, Melissa Murray, and Kate Shaw. It was acquired in 2022.

=== Pod Save the UK ===
Pod Save the UK is a Pod Save America spinoff focused on British politics, co-hosted by journalist Coco Khan and comedian Nish Kumar.

=== Other series ===
Other podcasts that have been produced and distributed by Crooked Media include:

- The Wilderness, a docuseries hosted by Jon Favreau related to the status and future of the Democratic Party
- With Friends Like These, an interview-based podcast that aims to showcase discussions between people who disagree or come from different backgrounds, hosted by Ana Marie Cox
- Takeline, a podcast about sports focused on basketball, hosted by Jason Concepcion and Renee Montgomery
- Keep It, a podcast on culture hosted by Louis Virtel and Nina Parker; Ira Madison III was a co-host from 2018 to 2025
- This Land, an investigation of Carpenter v. Murphy hosted by Rebecca Nagle
- Offline, a podcast about how being extremely online is "shaping everything from politics and culture to the ways we live, work, and interact with one another."
- Hysteria, a politics and culture podcast with a focus on women's issues, hosted by Erin Ryan and Alyssa Mastromonaco
- America Dissected, a treatment of the American health system hosted by Abdul El-Sayed
- What a Day, a daily news podcast hosted by Jane Coaston
- Missing America, a foreign policy podcast hosted by Ben Rhodes
- Wind of Change, a mini-series on the song Wind of Change hosted by Patrick Radden Keefe
- Hall of Shame, a sports podcast hosted by Rachel Bonnetta and Rachna Fruchbom
- Unholier Than Thou, a religion podcast hosted by Phillip Picardi
- Six Feet Apart, a podcast on the COVID-19 pandemic hosted by Alex Wagner
- Rubicon, a podcast on the impeachments of Donald Trump hosted by Brian Beutler
- X-Ray Vision, a pop culture podcast by Emmy award winning Jason Concepcion.
- Imani State of Mind, a mental health podcast hosted by Dr. Imani Walker and Megan "MegScoop" Thomas.
- Crooked Minis, for more in-depth coverage on topics that are less directly related to current events
- Assembly Required, a politics podcast hosted by Stacey Abrams
- Runaway Country, a politics podcast by Alex Wagner
- Dare We Say, a pop culture podcast hosted by Josie Totah, Alycia Pascual-Peña, and Yasmine Hamady
- Dissident at the Doorstep, a biographical and politics podcast hosted by Alison Klayman, Colin Jones, and Yangyang Cheng
- 544 Days, an autobiographical political podcast hosted by Jason Rezaian
- Empire City, hosted by Chenjerai Kumanyika
- Ruined, a horror film podcast hosted by Alison Leiby and Halle Kiefer
- Work Appropriate, a workplace advice podcast hosted by Anne Helen Petersen
- Stuck, hosted by Damon Young
- Shadow Kingdom, a true crime podcast hosted by Nicolo Majnoni
- Still Counting, a data-focused politics podcast hosted by former FiveThirtyEight journalists Nate Silver, Clare Malone, and Galen Druke

== Tours ==
Crooked Media has produced multiple live tours. The first tour by Crooked Media podcasts was in fall of 2017. The tour featured live versions of Pod Save America and Lovett or Leave it, and appearances from DeRay Mckesson, Ana Marie Cox, and other guests. Crooked Media tours have not just visited locations in the United States, including a 2018 tour with performances in Stockholm, Oslo, Amsterdam, and London.

== Activism ==
Crooked Media engages directly in political activism, including advocating for center-left policies and candidates, supporting get out the vote efforts, raising money, and encouraging political demonstrations. In elections from 2017 onwards, the company has collaborated with MoveOn on direct activism efforts, such as directing Pod Save America listeners to Republican town-hall meetings, and with Swing Left and Indivisible to raise money and encourage activism relevant to the 2018 United States elections and the Affordable Care Act. The Los Angeles Times reported that according to Crooked Media, it raised $2.7 million and directed 22,000 volunteers to fill shifts in competitive races during the 2018 midterms.

=== Vote Save America ===
Vote Save America is the name for the voter turnout initiatives and other activism by Crooked Media. It is also the name of their Political Action Committee.

In May 2019, the Crooked Media campaign "Vote Save America" launched the F*ck Gerry(mandering) Fund with Data for Progress to direct listeners' donations to 14 of the closest races in Virginia.

Ahead of the 2020 election cycle, under the umbrella of Vote Save America, they raised $32 million in the third quarter of 2020, which was directed to Democratic candidates. Through the Vote Save America program, Crooked Media has partnered with Fair Fight, an organization founded by former Democratic Georgia gubernatorial nominee Stacey Abrams, which is devoted to fighting voter suppression.

As of January 2024, Vote Save America planned to focus on fundraising for and directing volunteers to competitive down-ballot races for Congress as well as ballot initiatives because of the lack of interest in the Biden candidacy. As of March 2024, it was giving money each month to grassroots organizations in battleground states to do voter registration.

== Reception ==
The company's podcasts regularly sit near the top of the iTunes list of most popular podcasts. New York Times has called Crooked Media 'the left's answer to conservative talk radio'. Pod Save America was called "the nation's most popular political podcast" by Newsweek in 2017. Reviewing the first episodes of the company's flagship podcast, The Guardian noted: "Pod Save America's commentators are sparky and funny—and they have a habit of talking a whole lot of sense."

== Hosts ==
List of all Crooked Media podcast hosts
Host	Podcast	Notes
Abdul El-Sayed	America Dissected	
Aida Osman	Keep It	
Alex Wagner	Six Feet Apart Runaway Country	
Alyssa Mastromonaco	Hysteria	
Ana Marie Cox	With Friends Like These	
Ben Rhodes	Pod Save the World; Missing America	
Clint Smith III	Pod Save the People	
Coco Khan	Pod Save the UK	
Dan Pfeiffer	Pod Save America	
De'Ara Balenger	Pod Save the People	
DeRay Mckesson	Pod Save the People	
Dr. Imani Walker	Imani State of Mind	
Erin Ryan	Hysteria	
Gideon Resnick	What a Day	
Ira Madison III	Keep It	
Jane Coaston	What a Day	
Jason Concepcion	Takeline; X-Ray Vision	
Jason Rezaian	544 Days	
Jon Favreau	Pod Save America; The Wilderness; Offline	
Jon Lovett	Pod Save America; Lovett or Leave It	
Josie Duffy Rice	What a Day	
Kaya Henderson	Pod Save the People	
Kate Shaw	Strict Scrutiny	
Leah Litman	Strict Scrutiny	
Louis Virtel	Keep It	
Megan "MegScoop" Thomas	Imani State of Mind	
Melissa Murray	Strict Scrutiny	
Nish Kumar	Pod Save the UK	
Patrick Radden Keefe	Wind of Change	
Stacey Abrams	Assembly Required	
Phillip Picardi	Unholier Than Thou	
Priyanka Aribindi	What a Day	
Rachel Bonnetta	Hall of Shame	
Rachna Fruchbom	Hall of Shame	
Tre'vell Anderson	What a Day	
Rebecca Nagle	This Land	
Renee Montgomery	Takeline	
Samuel Sinyangwe	Pod Save the People	
Juanita Tolliver	What a Day	
Tommy Vietor	Pod Save America; Pod Save the World	
