= List of programs broadcast by BiteTV =

The following is a list of programs that were broadcast by BiteTV.

== Final programming ==
- Around the Next Bend
- Battle Cats
- Billy on the Street
- Bob and Margaret
- Brickleberry
- Caution: May Contain Nuts
- Comedy Bar
- Cops
- Destination Fear
- Free-Loading
- Halifax Comedy Festival
- Hollywood Hillbillies
- The IT Crowd
- It's Always Sunny in Philadelphia
- Keith Barry: Brain Hacker
- Kids in the Hall: Death Comes to Town
- Little Mosque on the Prairie
- TheLonleyFrankie
- Maury
- Park Bench
- Party Down South
- Penn & Teller: Fool Us
- Race to the Scene
- The Ron James Show
- Ryan Long Is Challenged
- S.O.S.: Save Our Skins
- Trailer Park Boys
- Warren United
- Whose Line Is It Anyway?
- Winnipeg Comedy Festival
- The Yukin’ Funny Comedy Show

== Earlier programming ==
- Arrested Development
- Comics Without Borders
- The Cutting Room
- Duck Quacks Don't Echo
- E-Town
- Extras
- Felt Up
- Guidance
- Mission Hill
- Happy Tree Friends
- Just for Laughs
- The Inbetweeners
- Jimmy Kimmel Live!
- Kenny vs. Spenny
- Made in Canada
- MADtv
- The Mighty Boosh
- Moone Boy
- Mr. Show
- Mumbai Calling
- Ooops!
- Papillon
- The Peter Serafinowicz Show
- Portlandia
- Pure Toonacy
- Race to the Scene
- Stand Up & Bite Me
- Stand-Up Sit-Down
- Stand Up With Bite
- Walk on the Wild Side
- The Wrong Coast
- The Wrong Mans
- This Hour Has 22 Minutes
