= Ira Madison III =

Writer and podcaster

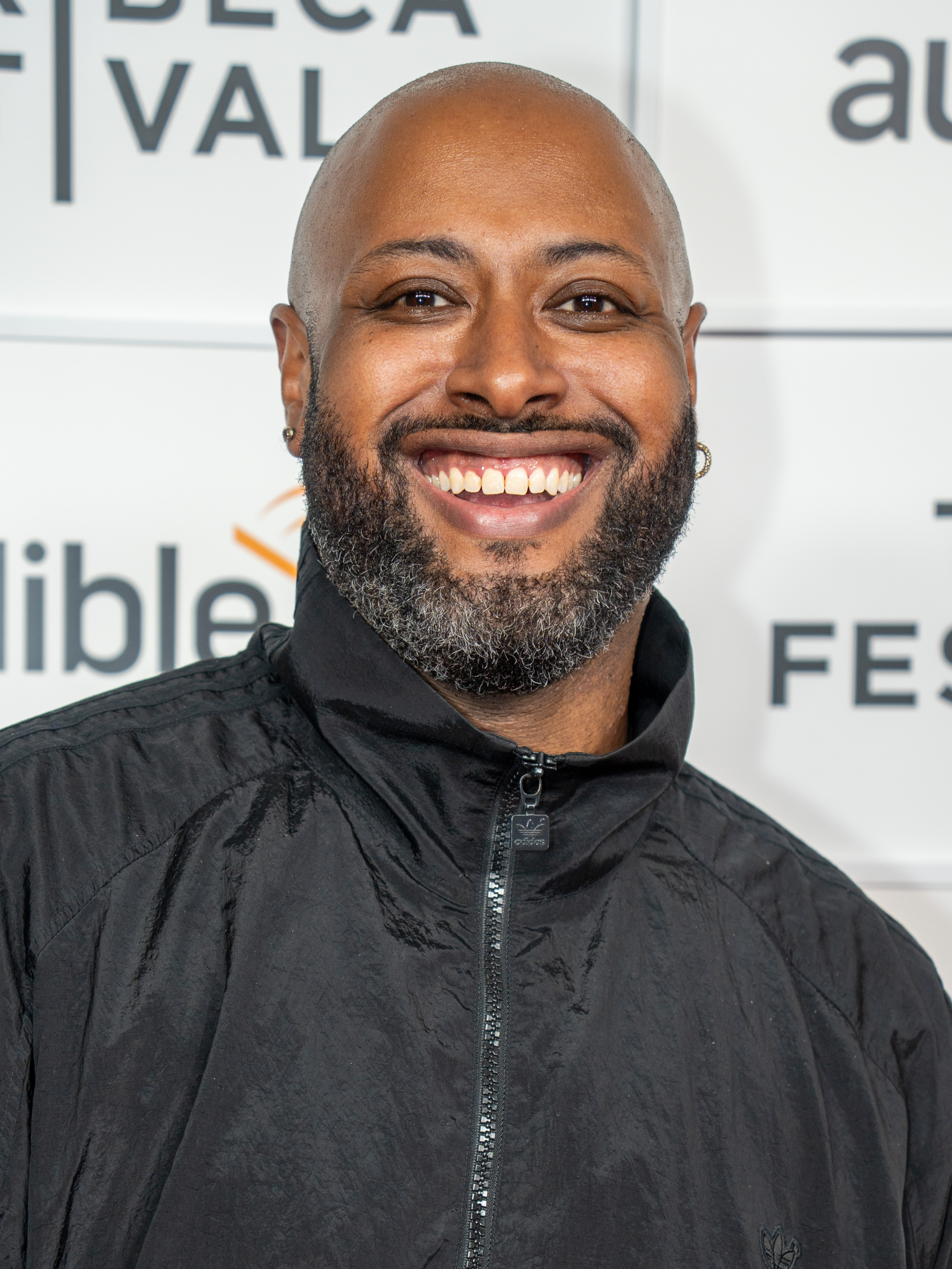
- Madison III at the 2025 Tribeca Festival
- Born: July 28, 1986 (age 40); Milwaukee, Wisconsin, U.S.
- Education: Loyola University Chicago; New York University
- Occupations: Writer; critic; podcaster
- Writing career
- Years active: 2013–present
- Website: iramadison.com

Ira Madison III (born July 28, 1986) is an American television writer and podcaster. From 2018 to 2025, he served as the main host of the Crooked Media podcast Keep It! He is a former critic at The Daily Beast, GQ and other publications.

== Early life ==
Madison attended Marquette University High School, then attended Loyola University Chicago as an undergraduate, then New York University's Tisch School of the Arts for a master's degree in Dramatic Writing.

== Career ==
Madison worked as a writer for MTV News and BuzzFeed in the early 2010s. He has since written for various publications, including Variety, GQ Magazine, and The Daily Beast. Madison was named one of the "most reliably hilarious and incisive cultural critics writing now" by Nylon in 2016. Nylon also named Madison to its 2016 list of "The 25 Best Things We Read Online In 2016" for his essay on Donald Trump's political rise. Madison co-hosted a podcast at MTV News with Doreen St. Félix in 2016 called Speed Dial with Ira and Doreen, that focused on music, pop culture, and race. In April 2017, Madison was featured in the documentary The Culture of Proximity. In January 2018, Crooked Media launched the podcast Keep It!, a show about pop culture and politics, which Madison hosted with Louis Virtel until 2025. The show is named for a phrase that Madison coined on Twitter, which refers to trends, news stories, and other pop cultural phenomena he'd rather not exist.

Madison was a writer on the Netflix series Daybreak and Q-Force. He has also written for the show Uncoupled and the Quibi original series Nikki Fre$h. In 2024, Madison appeared in the Brat Pack-themed documentary Brats.

Madison's debut essay collection, Pure Innocent Fun, was released by Random House on February 4, 2025. The book covers various pieces of pop culture from Madison's adolescence in the 1990s and 2000s. The title is a reference to a quote from reality television star NeNe Leakes that has since become a meme: "It’s unfortunate that people can change something that was just pure innocent fun into drama."

On a June 18, 2025 episode of Keep It!, Madison announced that he would be exiting his position as co-host in late July of that year. Madison's final episode as co-host, entitled "The End of an Ira", was released on July 30, 2025.

== Twitter suspension ==
In November 2020, Madison pranked Twitter by changing his name to Beto O'Rourke and writing "I'll drop my nudes if Texas goes blue". He was campaigning for Joe Biden in the 2020 United States presidential election. He went on to tweet "es grande". Madison was suspended from Twitter for impersonating O'Rourke.

== Personal life ==
Madison is gay, and has been referred to as the "King of Gay Twitter" by Milwaukee Magazine.
