= Pod Save America =

American political podcast

- Genre: Political; Progressive talk radio
- Language: English

Cast and voices
- Hosted by: Jon Favreau; Daniel Pfeiffer; Jon Lovett; Tommy Vietor

Production
- Length: 41–96 minutes

Publication
- Original release: January 2017
- Provider: Crooked Media
- Updates: Twice-weekly (Tuesday, and Friday)

Related
- Related shows: Pod Save the World
- Website: Official

Pod Save America is an American Progressive political podcast developed and distributed by Crooked Media. The podcast debuted in January 2017 and airs twice per week, hosted by a rotating cast of former Barack Obama staffers Jon Favreau, Tommy Vietor, Jon Lovett, and Dan Pfeiffer.

It is the flagship podcast of Crooked Media, a media company founded by Favreau, Vietor, and Lovett. The show averages more than 1.5 million listeners an episode, and has been downloaded more than 120 million times as of November 2017.

Four Pod Save America one-hour HBO TV specials aired in fall 2018 to cover the U.S. midterm elections. Crooked Media also films the podcasts and releases them on their YouTube channel.

== History ==
The podcast debuted in January 2017 as a successor to Keepin' It 1600 (2016), a political podcast produced by Bill Simmons' of The Ringer, hosted by Favreau, Vietor, Lovett, and Pfeiffer. The title is a play-on-words with "God Save America."

In an interview with Recode's Kara Swisher, the hosts said that rather than continuing their previous podcast, they were inspired by the election of Donald Trump as president to create a progressive media company with a network of podcasts. They sought more independence and the freedom to do political activism. Their goal was to be a reliable source of information to their millions of fans and listeners who placed their trust in them.

In the early days of the podcast, the hosts interviewed Obama as their first guest, bolstering their Obama staffer credentials. Over the next few months, they interviewed other Democratic politicians, such as Amy Klobuchar.

In the fall of 2017, Crooked Media took the podcast on its first live tour, Pod Tours America. Live shows were recorded and released as podcast episodes. An international tour, Pod Tours the World, was announced for 2018, with live shows in Stockholm, Oslo, Amsterdam, and London. In November 2017, the group combined a sold-out live episode taping at The National Theatre in Richmond, Virginia with their organizing efforts for Ralph Northam's campaign in the 2017 Virginia gubernatorial election.

In 2023, the podcast interviewed Dean Philips for his 2024 presidential campaign.

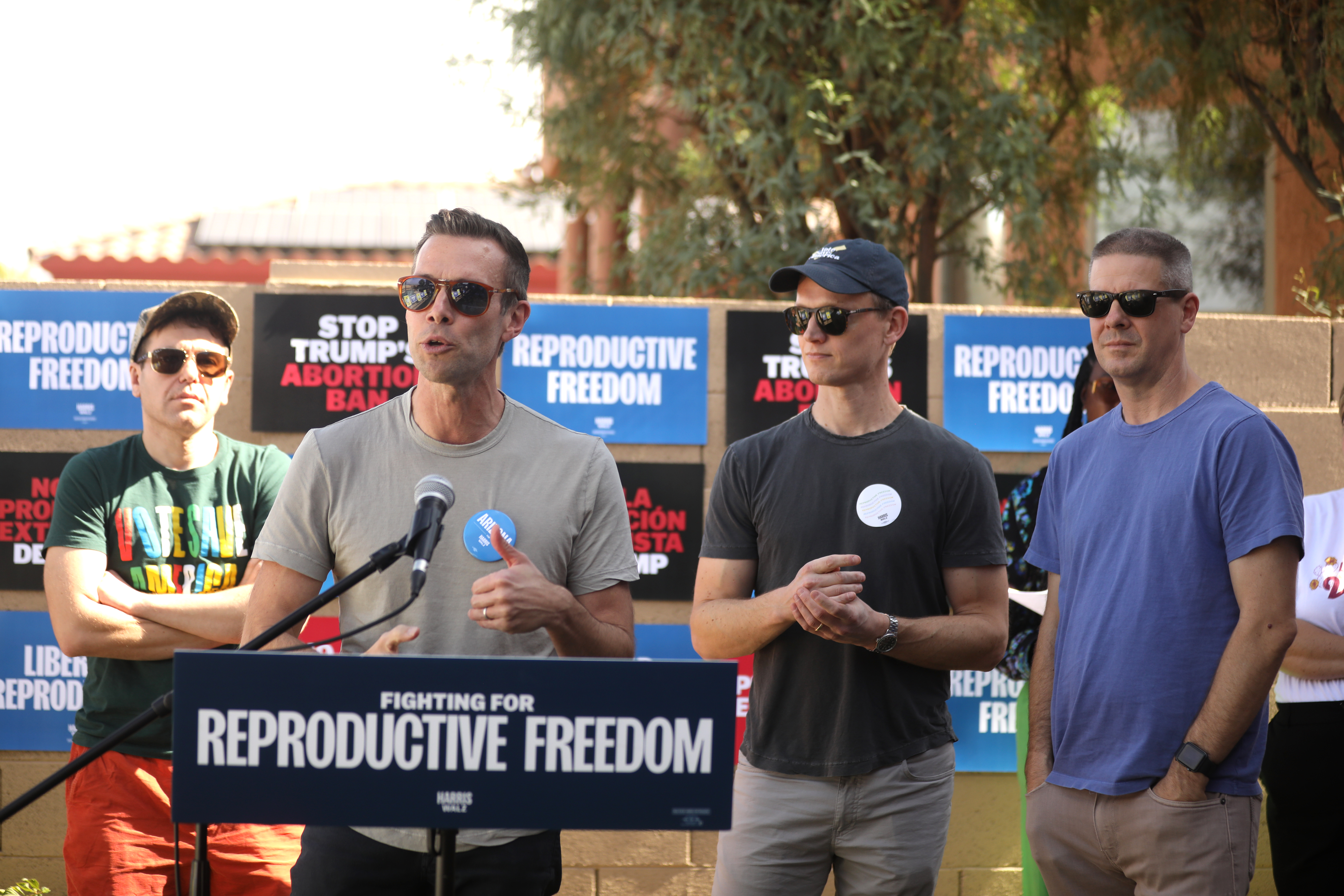
Jon Lovett, Jon Favreau, Tommy Vietor and Daniel Pfeiffer of Pod Save America speaking with attendees at a canvass launch for the Kamala Harris for President campaign in Phoenix, Arizona

Leading up to the first 2024 presidential debate, the podcast hosts criticized the negative media coverage surrounding Joe Biden's age. Like most other mainstream high-profile Democrats at the time, they did not call for Biden to step aside.

Following the debate, where Biden performed poorly, Pod Save America was one of the first influential progressive talk shows to call for President Biden to drop out of the 2024 presidential election. In the immediate aftermath of the debate, they seriously critiqued Biden's performance and declared him unfit to be the Democratic nominee. In response, the Biden campaign's chief digital strategy director, Rob Flaherty, called out the four Pod Save America hosts as "Self Important Podcasters". During the podcast's Democracy or Else Tour in Boston, Massachusetts, the hosts held an event with political commentator Mehdi Hasan and Massachusetts Governor Maura Healey, where they held a debate on whether Biden should drop out.

After Biden withdrew from the race, the hosts began supporting canvassing and voter outreach for Kamala Harris's presidential campaign. The four spoke at a canvass launch in Phoenix, Arizona.

Following Harris's loss in November 2024, Pod Save America held an exclusive interview with several members of her campaign staff, including Stephanie Cutter, Jen O'Malley Dillon, Quentin Fulks, and former Obama official, and frequent podcast guest and coworker, David Plouffe. The episode generated online backlash against the Kamala Harris presidential campaign, as her staff blamed "political headwinds" for their loss and denied any alleged mistakes they may have made, such as failing to distinguish themselves from the unpopular policies of the Biden administration.

== Content ==
The podcast typically covers recent news items relating to politics, including the Trump administration, the U.S. government, and the Democratic Party, as well as center-left grassroots activism.

The show typically features interviews with politicians, activists, and journalists, including Obama's final interview as president.

== Reception ==
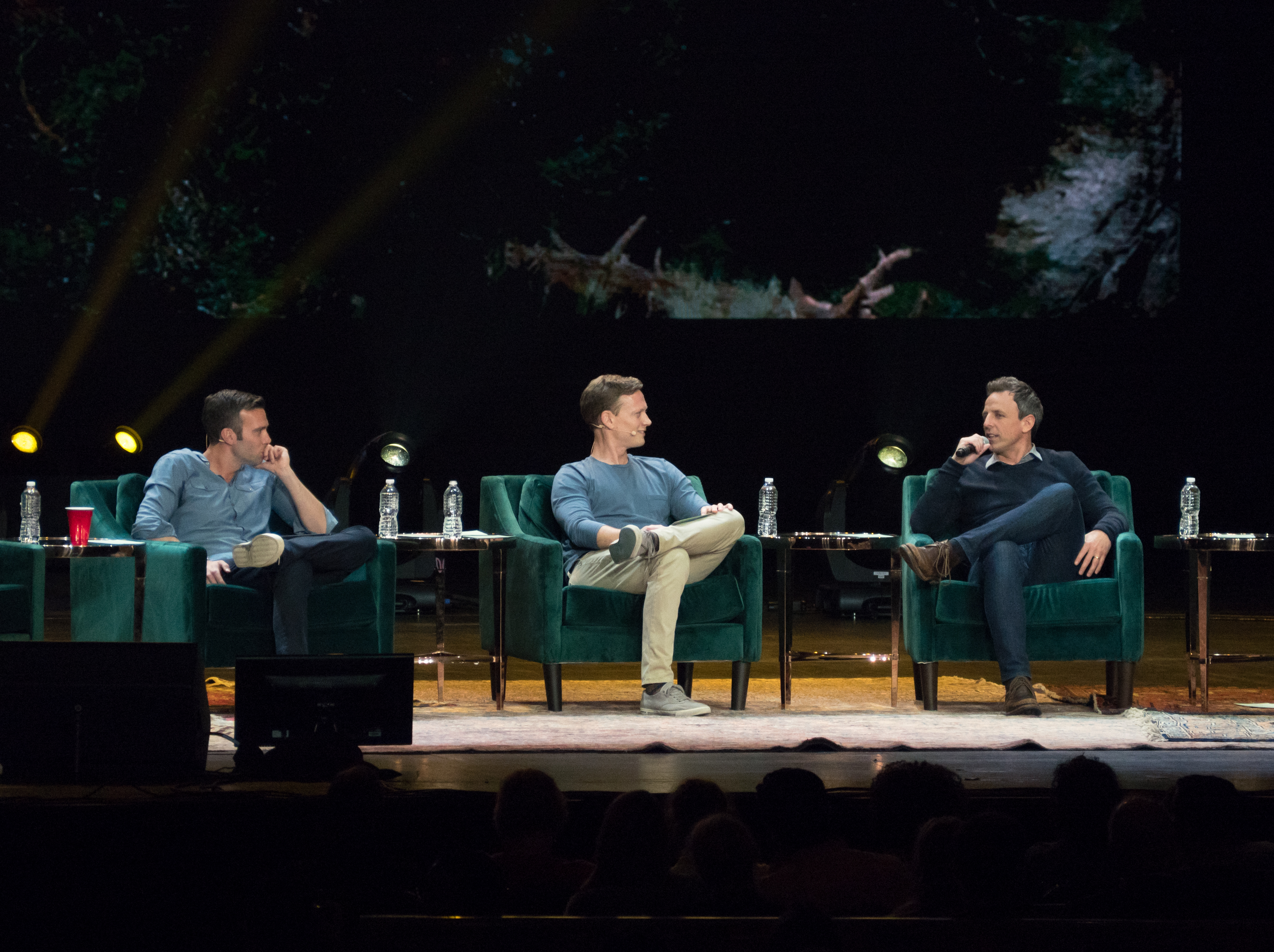
Favreau, Vietor, and guest Seth Meyers at a live taping at Radio City Music Hall

The show averages more than 1.5 million listeners an episode, and had been downloaded more than 120 million times by November 2017. Edison Research ranked Pod Save America the tenth most listened-to podcast in the U.S. in the fourth quarter of 2024. Making its first appearance in the top 10, Edison attributed the surge in popularity to the political news cycle. The show ranked number 24 in the fourth quarter 2025 rankings.

The New York Times described the podcast as "one of the big breakout hits of the nascent resistance movement", and "the left's answer to conservative talk radio... with a shoestring budget and no organizational backing, its hosts seem to have created something that liberals have spent almost two decades, and hundreds of millions of dollars, futilely searching for."

The San Francisco Chronicle called it "one of the nation's most popular podcasts." GQ called it one of the "most popular strategies for coping with the looming death of the republic."

Newsweek wrote that the show's hosts "do something far more rare [than political analysis], which is to make politics entertaining and even fun, without ever downplaying what they see as the threat posed to American democracy by the man elected to defend it."

Pod Save America won the 2025 Webby Award for News & Politics Podcast.

== See also ==
- Vote Save America
