= Jon Lovett =

American podcaster, writer, and television producer (born 1982)

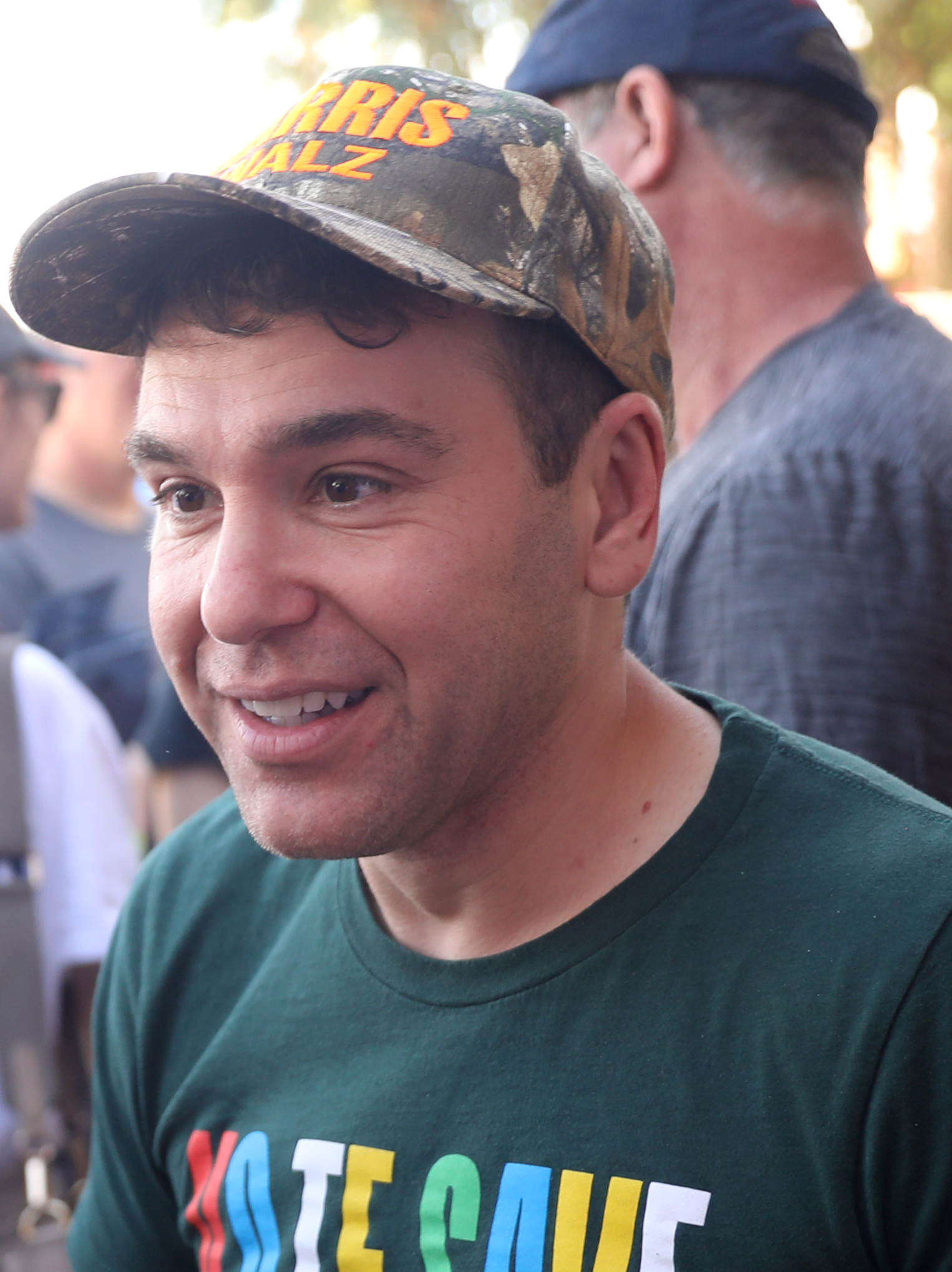
- Lovett in 2024
- Born: Jonathan Ira Lovett; August 17, 1982 (age 44); Woodbury, Long Island, New York, U.S.
- Education: Williams College (BA)
- Occupations: Speechwriter; podcaster; television producer; screenwriter; comedian
- Years active: 2004–present
- Political party: Democratic
- Spouse: Ari Schwartz (m. 2026)
- Partner: Ronan Farrow (2011–2022)

Jonathan Ira Lovett (born August 17, 1982) is an American podcaster, comedian, journalist, and former speechwriter. Lovett is a co-founder of Crooked Media, along with Jon Favreau and Tommy Vietor. All three formerly worked together as White House staffers during the Obama administration. Lovett is a regular host of the Crooked Media podcasts Pod Save America and Lovett or Leave It. As a speechwriter, he worked for both President Barack Obama and Hillary Clinton when she was a United States senator and a 2008 presidential candidate. Lovett also co-created the NBC sitcom 1600 Penn, and was a writer and producer on the third season of HBO's The Newsroom. Lovett appeared as a contestant on Survivor 47 in 2024.

== Early life ==
Lovett was born and raised in Woodbury, Long Island in a Reform Jewish family of Ukrainian ancestry that operated a box factory started by his grandfather. He attended Syosset High School.

Lovett graduated from Williams College in 2004 with a degree in mathematics. His senior thesis, Rotating Linkages in a Normed Plane, led to a related publication on the same topic in American Mathematical Monthly. Lovett was the Williams College class speaker at his commencement ceremony in 2004.

After graduation, Lovett spent a year working as a paralegal and doing stand-up comedy on the side.

== Political speechwriter ==
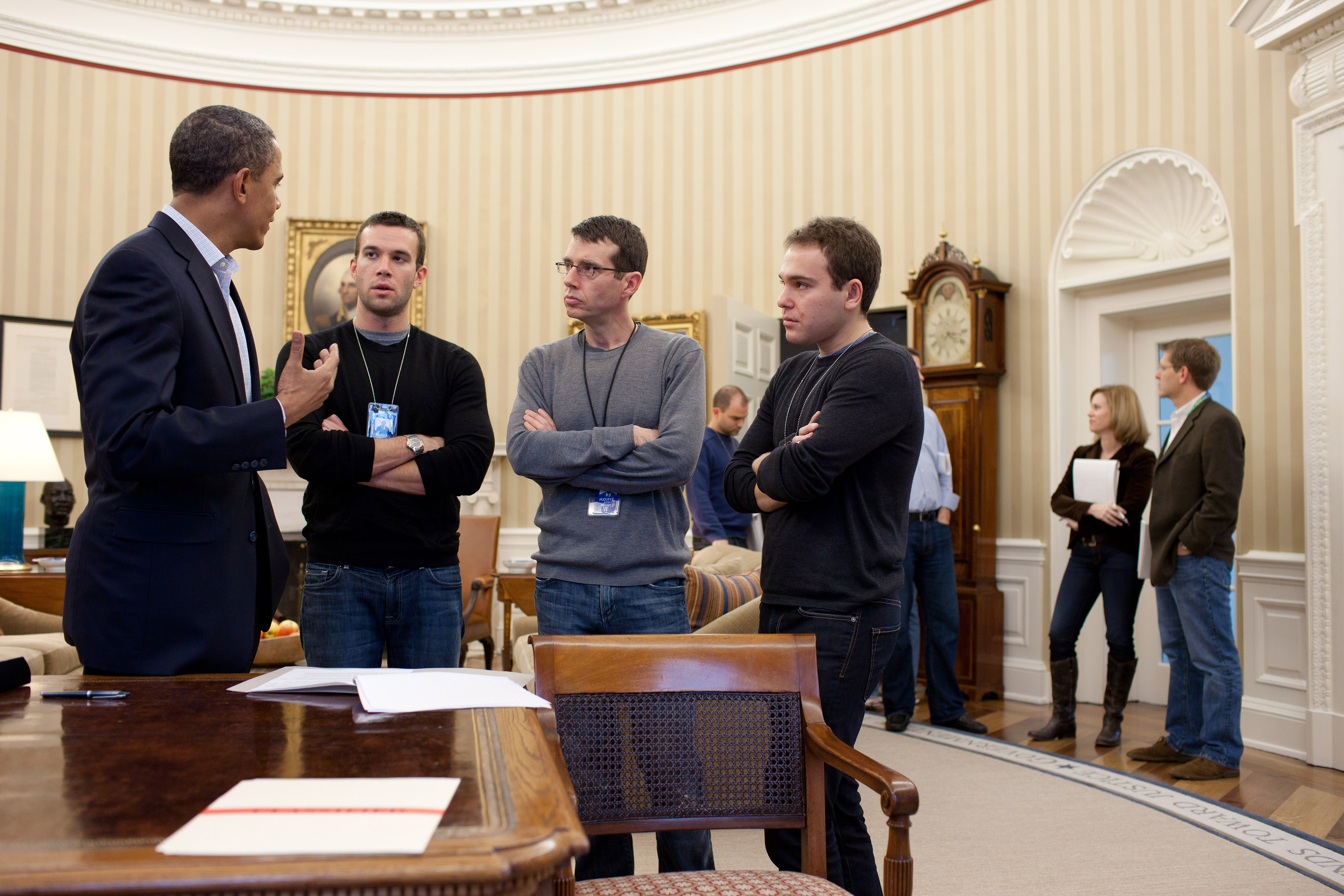
Lovett (fourth from left) with President Obama and other speechwriters in 2011

In 2004, Lovett volunteered for John Kerry's presidential campaign. He was asked to write a statement for the candidate, and his work led to an offer of a writing internship. He briefly worked in Jon Corzine's Senate office. He was hired in 2005 to assist Sarah Hurwitz as a speechwriter for then-Senator Hillary Clinton, and he continued to write speeches for her through her 2008 presidential campaign.

When Clinton lost the 2008 Democratic primary contest, Lovett won an anonymous contest to write speeches for President Barack Obama in the White House. Lovett wrote speeches in the Obama administration for three years, working closely with Jon Favreau and David Axelrod. Prominent speeches that he wrote include policy speeches on financial reform and don't ask, don't tell, as well as remarks at the White House Correspondents' Dinner.

Lovett secretly officiated the first same-sex marriage in the White House, before the Obama administration supported same-sex marriage.

== Media career ==
=== Television ===
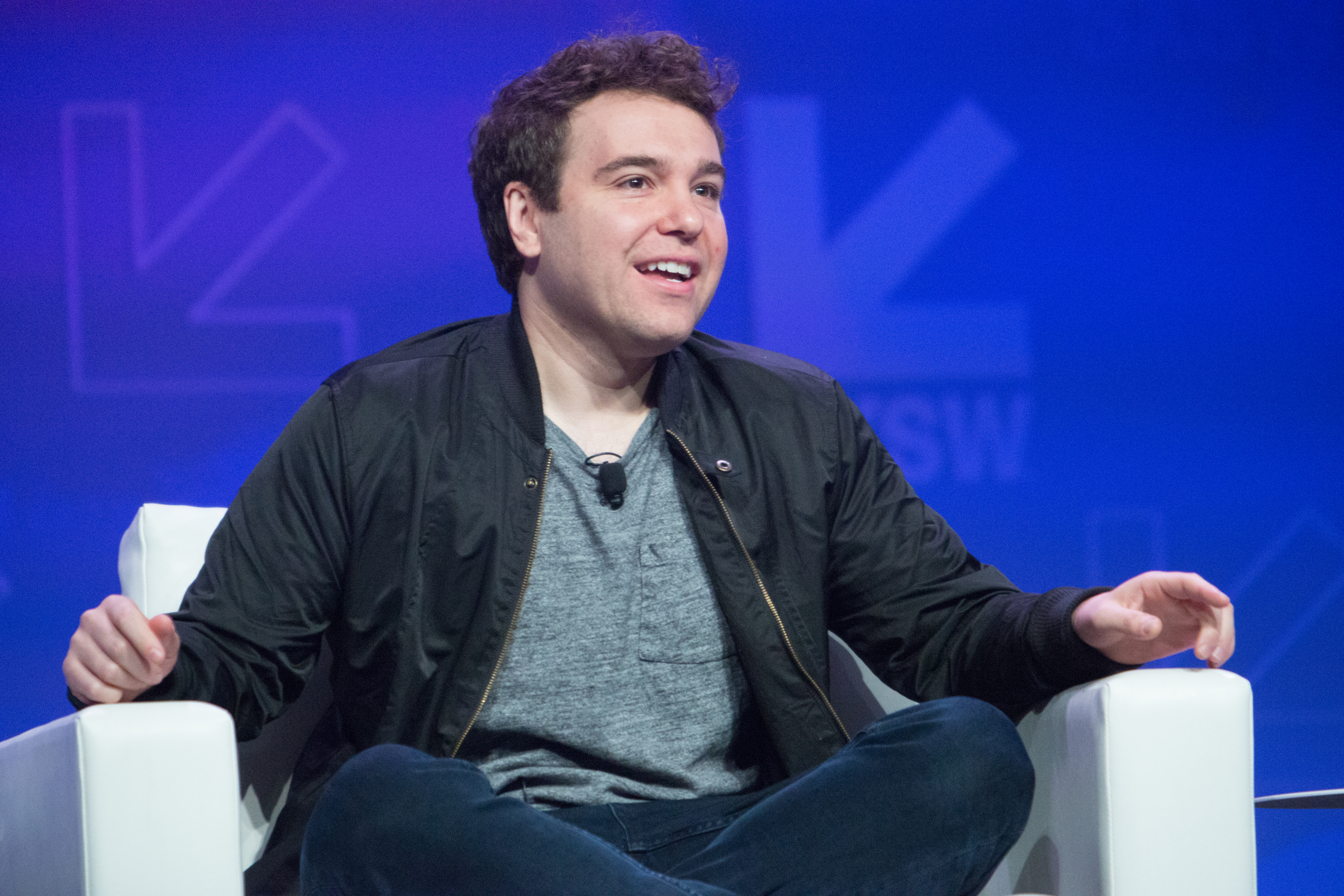
Lovett in 2017

In 2011, before Barack Obama ran for reelection, Lovett left the White House and moved to California to become a screenwriter, citing a desire to write independently and focus on creative comedy full-time. He collaborated with Josh Gad and Jason Winer on the television series 1600 Penn, of which Lovett was a co-creator, executive producer, and writer from 2012 until its cancellation in 2013. He then worked as a writer, producer, and advisor on season three of HBO's The Newsroom. From 2012 to 2015, Lovett also contributed opinion pieces to venues like The Atlantic. In 2024, he competed on the 47th season of the CBS reality television show Survivor; he was the first contestant voted off the season.

=== Crooked Media ===
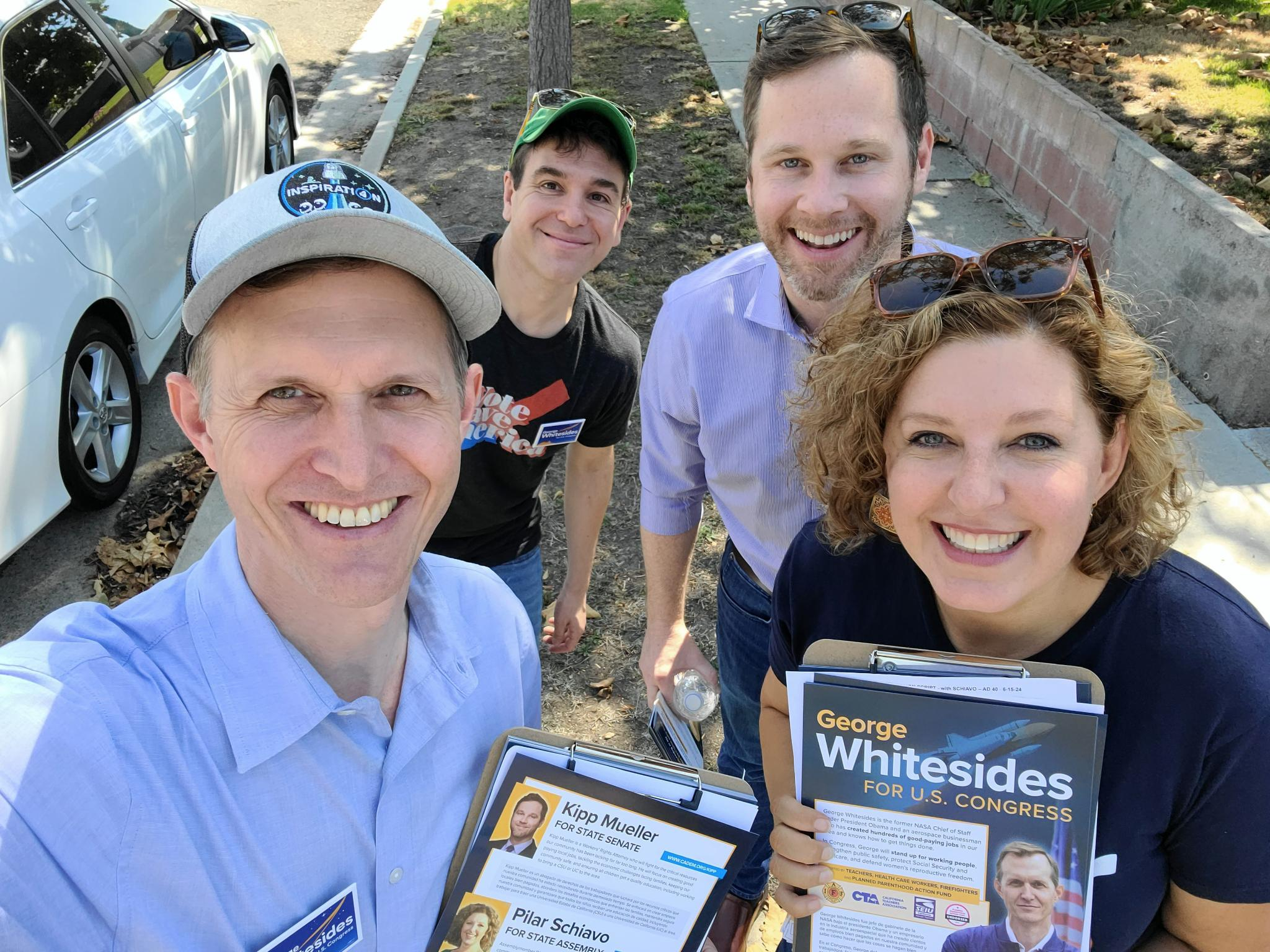
Lovett (left rear) with George Whitesides and Pilar Schiavo in a campaign rally for the two candidates' campaigns

Starting in March 2016, Lovett co-hosted The Ringer's political podcast Keepin' it 1600 with former fellow Obama staffers Jon Favreau, Dan Pfeiffer, and Tommy Vietor. The podcast was intended to cover the 2016 presidential race and not expected to continue after that. But after the November 2016 election, Lovett, Favreau and Vietor wished to become engaged in politics again without having to leave Los Angeles or return to political campaigning. So they founded a liberal media company, Crooked Media, with the flagship podcast Pod Save America. Crooked Media, and Pod Save America in particular, has been compared to previous left-wing efforts such as Air America to match America's conservative talk radio, and Lovett has been characterized as providing comic relief to the programming. The company has since launched a range of podcasts, several of which regularly feature Lovett.

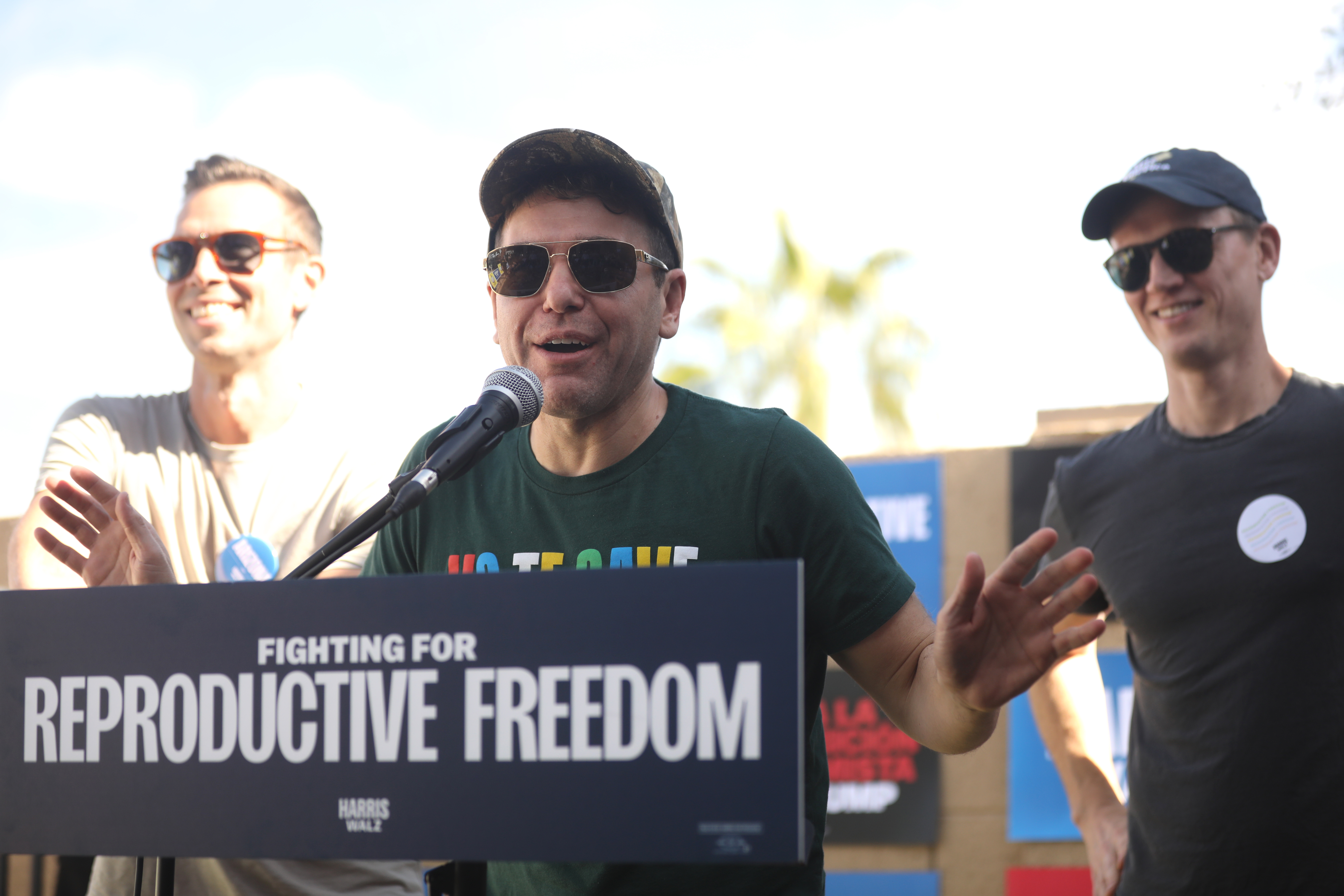
Lovett with Pod Save America at a canvass launch for Kamala Harris during the 2024 United States presidential election in Phoenix, Arizona

In March 2017, Lovett began hosting Lovett or Leave It, a panel show podcast produced by Crooked Media. The podcast, typically recorded in front of a live audience in Los Angeles, embarked on national and international tours featuring live versions of both Pod Save America and Lovett or Leave It. He was also involved in launching Crooked Media's voter recruitment and education project, Vote Save America. During the 2017 Virginia gubernatorial election, Lovett supported and door knocked for Tom Perriello in the Democratic primary. After the primary he along with Pod Save America campaigned for Northam days before the election.

== Personal life ==
Lovett is gay. He and investigative journalist and author Ronan Farrow became romantically involved in 2011. In October 2019, Farrow published Catch and Kill, where he publicly announced their engagement after proposing to Lovett in an earlier draft of his book. However, in a March 2023 episode of his podcast, Lovett or Leave It, Lovett stated that he was single after the end of a "10 and a half year" relationship.

On March 14, 2025, Lovett and Ari Schwartz, chief of staff at Crooked Media, announced their engagement. The couple married on May 23, 2026.
