= Tommy Vietor =

American political commentator and podcast host

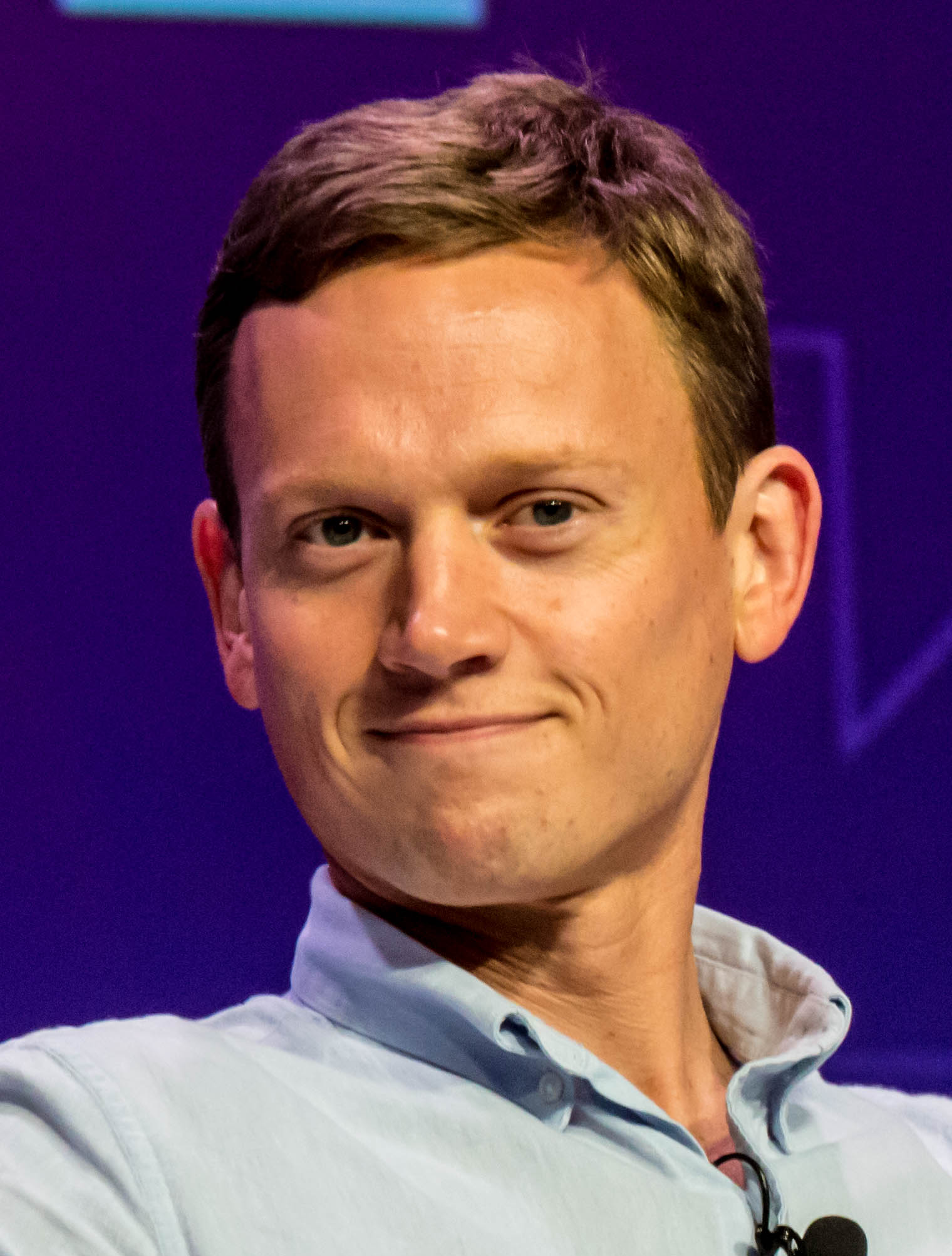
- Vietor in 2017
- Born: Thomas Frederick Vietor IV; August 31, 1980 (age 46); Boston, Massachusetts, U.S.
- Education: Kenyon College (BA)
- Political party: Democratic
- Spouse: Hanna Koch (m. 2018)
- Children: 2

Thomas Frederick Vietor IV (born August 31, 1980) is an American political commentator and podcaster. He was a spokesman for President Barack Obama and the United States National Security Council from 2011 to 2012. He is a co-founder of Crooked Media with fellow former Obama staffers Jon Favreau and Jon Lovett, and co-hosts the podcasts Pod Save America and Pod Save the World.

== Early life ==
Vietor was raised in Dedham, Massachusetts and attended Milton Academy. He graduated from Kenyon College in 2002 with a BA in philosophy. While at Kenyon, he played on the men's lacrosse team and was a member of the Psi Upsilon fraternity.

== Career ==
=== Political campaigns (2004–2008) ===
In 2004, Vietor turned down an offer from the John Kerry presidential campaign in favor of joining Illinois State Senator Barack Obama for his first statewide run. His first job for Obama was driving the candidate's press van across rural Illinois. During this period, Vietor worked with and learned from Obama spokesman Robert Gibbs.

Vietor was deputy press secretary for the Barack Obama Illinois Senate campaign in 2004, then became deputy press secretary for Senator Obama the following year and press secretary the year after that. During Obama's presidential campaign from 2007 to 2008, he was Iowa Press Secretary.

=== White House positions (2009–2013) ===
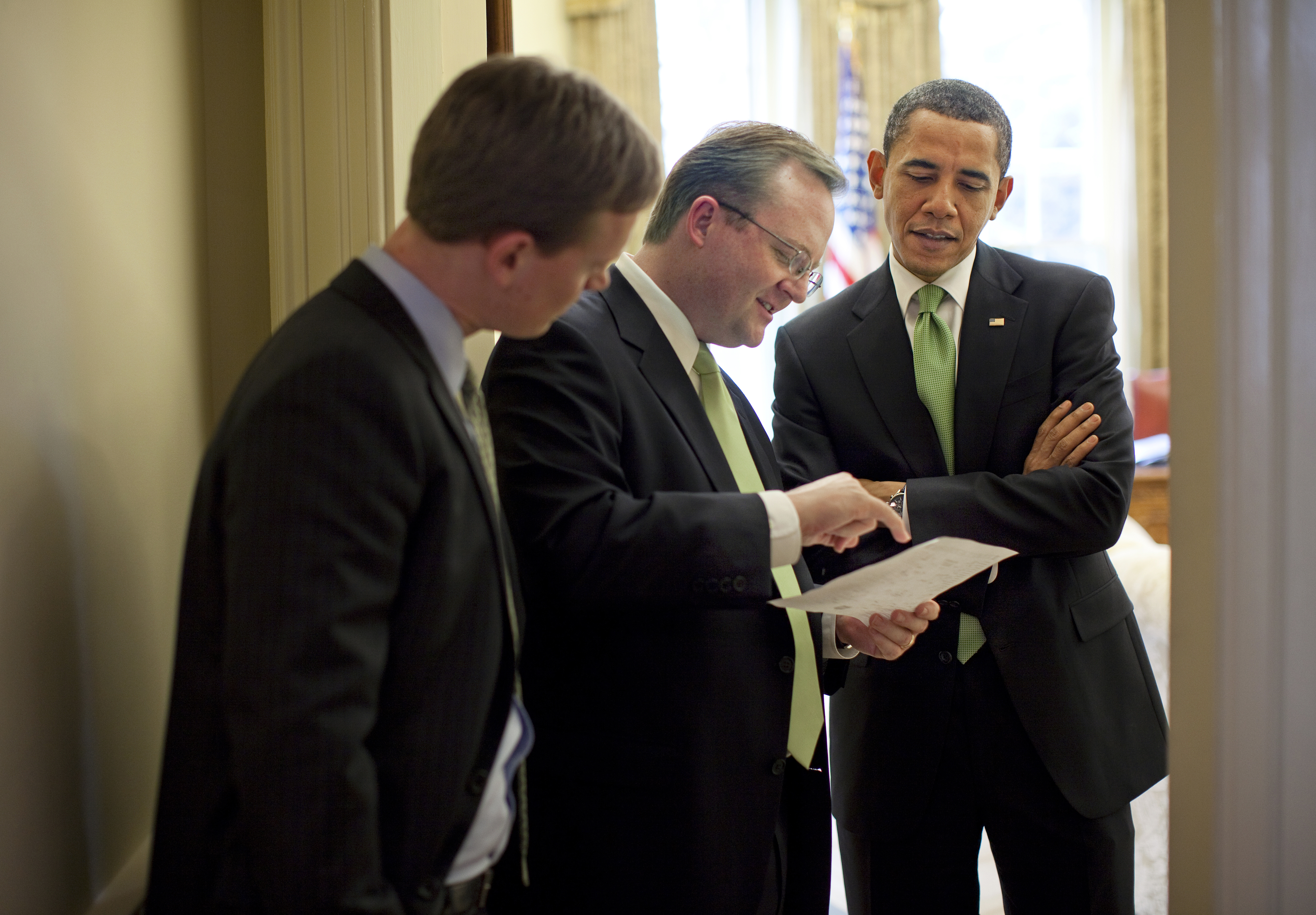
Vietor with Robert Gibbs and Barack Obama

Following Obama's victory in the 2008 presidential election, Vietor became the Assistant White House Press Secretary, from January 2009 to January 2011; he then served as National Security Spokesman and Special assistant to the president from January 2011 until March 2013.

Vietor left the White House in March 2013, along with Obama's Director of Speechwriting Jon Favreau, to pursue a career in private sector consulting and screenwriting. Together, they founded the communications firm Fenway Strategies.

=== Podcasting ===
In March 2016, Vietor became a regular co-host of The Ringer's political podcast Keepin' it 1600, along with Favreau and their fellow Obama administration alumni Dan Pfeiffer and Jon Lovett.

Shortly after the 2016 presidential election, Vietor, Lovett and Favreau decided to pursue podcasting and activism on a full-time basis. They founded their own company, Crooked Media, and launched a new podcast, Pod Save America. In an interview with Recode′s Kara Swisher, Vietor explained that "If Hillary [Clinton] had won, we probably would've kept doing this as a hobby... But when she lost, I think we all had this existential crisis, where it didn't feel right to wake up every day and obsess about politics and what's happening in the country, and then go to work doing something else."

Along with Ben Rhodes, who served as Deputy National Security Advisor for Strategic Communications and Speechwriting under President Obama, Vietor also hosts a podcast covering global issues and policy making decisions called Pod Save the World. The podcast debuted on January 10, 2017.

Leading up to the 2022 FIFA World Cup in Qatar, Vietor co-hosted with Roger Bennett (best known for Men in Blazers) the seven-part mini-series World Corrupt.

In 2019, Vietor hosted a five-part miniseries about the Iowa caucuses called Pod Save America: On the Ground in Iowa. The miniseries was produced by Pineapple Street Studios.

== Personal life ==
In July 2018, Vietor married Hanna Koch in Healdsburg, California. Vietor was previously engaged in 2009 to Katie McCormick-Lelyveld, Michelle Obama's chief spokeswoman.

On January 27, 2022, Tommy and Hanna Vietor experienced the stillbirth of a daughter at 24 weeks of pregnancy. On Instagram, Vietor wrote that "A knot in her umbilical robbed her of nutrients and us of our future together". The couple had a daughter on December 6, 2022, and on May 7, 2024, they had a son.
