= Political podcast =

Genre of media

A political podcast focuses on contemporary politics and current affairs. Most political podcasts maintain a connection to an existing media source, such as a newspaper or magazine; however, this is not always the case. They aim to inform, entertain, or advocate a cause. They are often cost-effective to produce and require basic equipment. Their audiences are generally people interested in current events, and programs usually have a duration of a half hour to an hour.

== Background ==
With increasing growth of the Internet and new technologies and devices to disseminate information digitally such as laptop computers and smartphones, political podcasts have become an "emerging industry" according to Nicholas Quah of NiemanLab. Most began as spinoffs of existing media. In 2005, Slate began its Slate Political Gabfest podcast with its journalists discussing current events. Since then, many new programs have been created. Most political podcasts maintain a connection with an existing news source; for example, the podcast Start Making Sense is closely allied with its parent publication, The Nation magazine. Podcast growth was spurred in 2016 by the United States presidential election. By 2025, 15% of people in the United States were listening to news podcasts weekly, reflecting the medium's growing role in political and current-affairs coverage.

== Content ==
Political podcasts serve a variety of purposes, such as to inform, to make money, to entertain (often with satire and humor), to advocate a cause, or to accomplish some mix of these and other purposes. Some podcasts focus on the horse-race aspects of elections, such as strategy and which candidate is doing well in the polls, while others focus on politics and issues. They typically feature reporters, politicians, academics, writers, pollsters, and others who have established credentials in the public sphere; for example, Start Making Sense, hosted by historian Jon Wiener, has featured discussions on Edward Snowden, campaign strategy, inequality and class conflict, The Nation's yearlong investigation into abuses in the federally-run private prisons, as well as various authors and artists and activists. Some are designed as public relations vehicles to bolster the candidacy of a politician, such as Hillary Clinton's With Her podcast. Her podcast was criticized for being promotional and lacking critical commentary or substantive information about her policy positions, according to the political journalism organization Politico.

Most political podcasts tend to have a liberal or progressive orientation. Analyst Charley Locke suggested that a reason for this was that many podcasts were started by progressive news outlets such as Slate and The Nation and NPR and The New Yorker, and these podcasts began many years ago. However, the podcast Ricochet was started to cater to an "articulate, politically aware, conservative audience that feels under siege in college towns," according to one of its founders. Some podcasts explicitly strive to represent all parts of the political spectrum, such as KCRW's Left, Right & Center which features three pundits, understandably, from the left, right and center. A February 2023 Brookings Institution study of 79 prominent political podcasts found conservative podcasters were eleven times more likely as liberal podcasters to make statements that fact checkers could refute.

While a podcast's political orientation can lean to the left or the right or the center, it usually reflects the focus of the parent medium, and strives to bring multiple points of view within the overall focus, while covering current events and other issues in the news. Weekly podcasts are often tied to the news cycle, and many summarize recent events at the beginning of their program. Podcasts typically do not replace news reporting, but augment it. Most tend to be thoughtful, low-key discussions, with a relaxed and conversational tone, as if a listener was eavesdropping on reporters in a District of Columbia bar after hours. The podcast Keepin' it 1600 with speechwriter Jon Favreau and Obama administration adviser Dan Pfeiffer goes a bit further, where the "political chatter flows unfiltered" with occasional vulgar language.

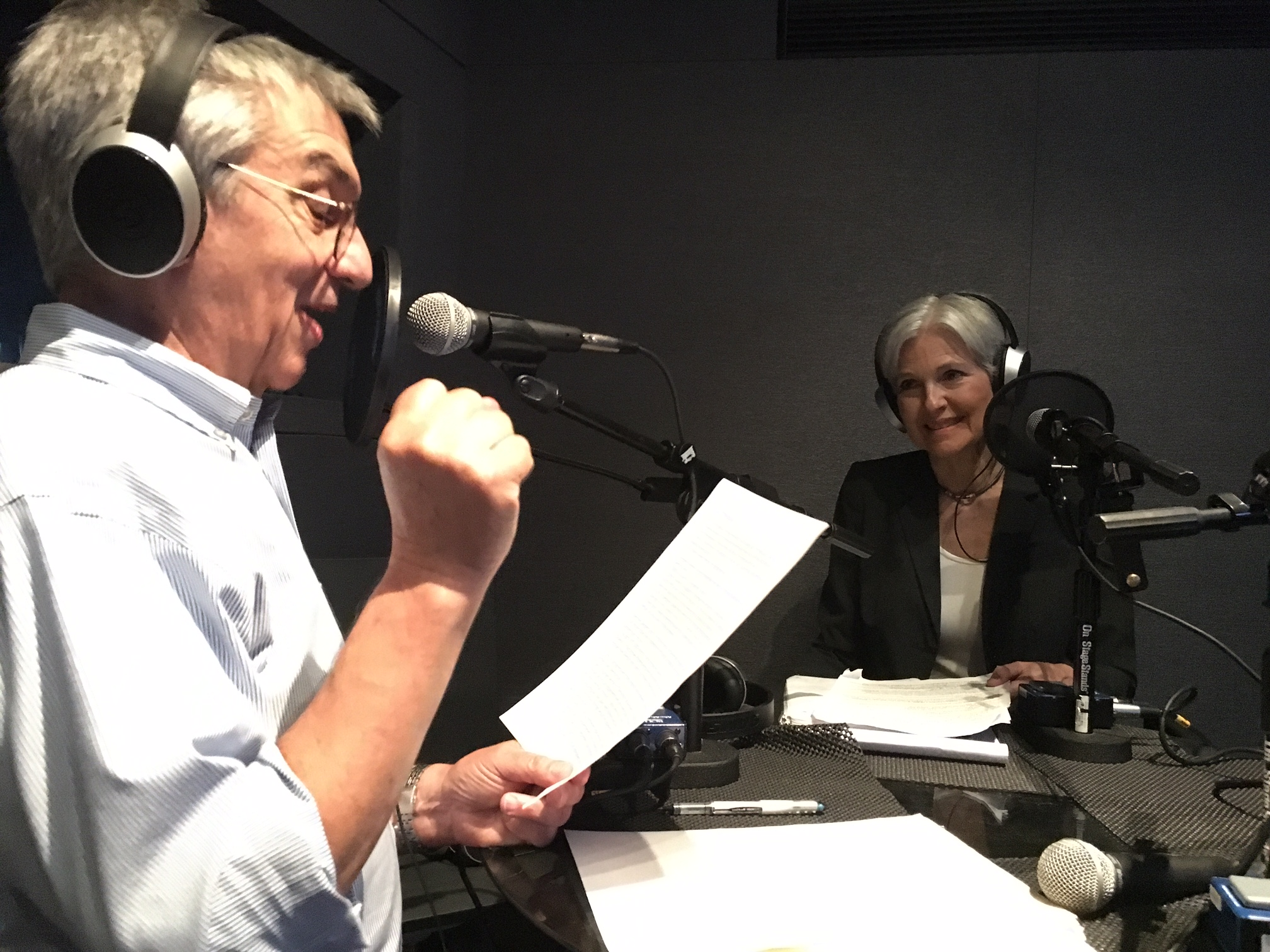
Historian Jon Wiener, host of The Nation magazine podcast Start Making Sense, interviews Green Party candidate Jill Stein in 2016.

== Audiences ==
Audiences are interested in current events. They include other professionals, such as journalists and campaign managers and politicians, who can use the podcast's content as source material for future articles that they might write or produce. Some podcasts focus on a specific region; there are podcasts which focus on North Carolina politics, on the Kansas City region, on Texas, and on Latino audiences.

== Format ==
Podcasts typically last between a half hour and an hour, and usually begin with an identifying tune or music as a lead-in. They are usually accompanied by links to other social media such as Facebook and Twitter, and they have feedback buttons for posting comments or contacting hosts or guests on the show. Most follow an interview format in which the host begins by introducing the program, then the guests and their qualifications. A few shows are accompanied by a text-version of the audio content. Most podcasts are digital audio files, but if accompanied by video, they are called video podcasts or vodcasts. Some shows are hosted by comedians or satirists; for example, Iranian-born Kambiz Hosseini hosts the podcast Five in the Afternoon from Brooklyn. Some podcasters have run into trouble with authorities; for example, journalist Choo Chin-woo of South Korea was arrested after publishing content that allegedly "defamed" the brother of a governing party's candidate. Podcaster Jung Bong-ju of the show I'm a Weasel was found "guilty of spreading false rumors" by the government of South Korea as part of a crackdown against free speech, and he was sentenced to one year in jail.

== Technology ==
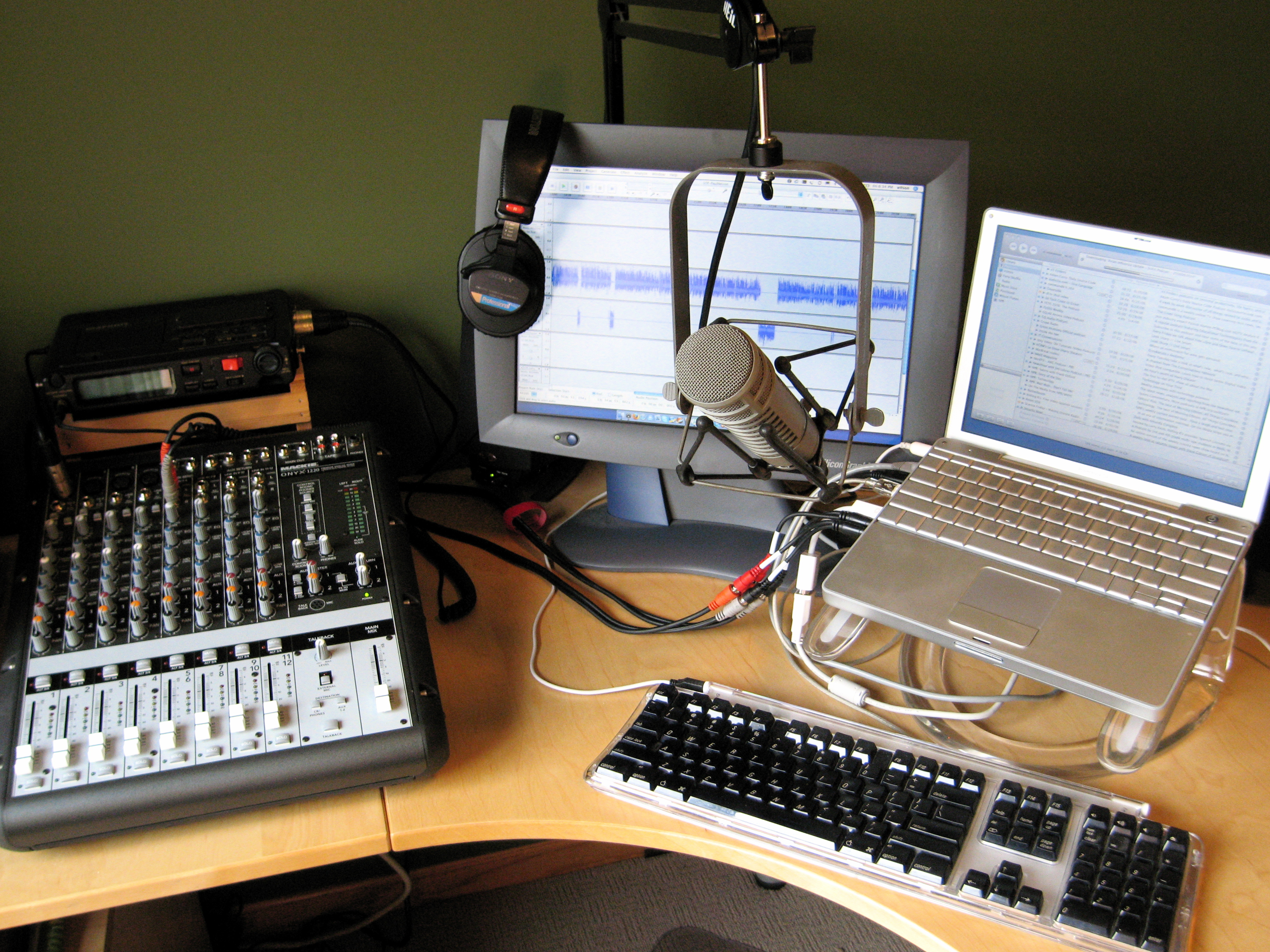
A podcasting 'studio' in 2006. Since then, advances in telecommunications technology have enabled podcasters with laptops and software and microphones to produce programs for minimal expense and maximum portability.

Listeners need a web connection and a device to play the podcast, such as an iPod or Smartphone or computer. Controls allow the user to skip through the audio, perhaps by using a mouse or swiping a finger, and often resembles the old boombox type controls: play, pause, fast forward, skip, and replay. A political podcast's icon is valuable "graphic real estate" since it is one of the few visual cues that identify a particular program. Podcasts can be downloaded into a device and then played offline at the listener's convenience; if podcasts are played directly from the Internet without being downloaded, it is sometimes referred to as streaming. Podcast producers do not necessarily require that the host and guests be in the same physical space, such that a host in California can interview a guest in Maine, for example. Broadcast technology can vary from complex studios to basic setups, with the general trend being that equipment is getting more powerful and less expensive as time goes by. One journalist described how he souped up a laptop to handle a podcast:

We got a couple of microphones, a little converter box that plugs into my laptop and some cheap software, and Voila! — my desk is transformed into a recording studio. ... The whole setup fits in a backpack, and during the presidential conventions, we should be able to use it to do real-time interviews anywhere. The system uploads more or less instantly, so I can go from recording an interview to live on the website in about 10 minutes.

— Paul Singer in USA Today in 2016

== Politicians on podcasts ==
=== Barack Obama ===
On June 22, 2015, President Barack Obama sat down with host Marc Maron for the 613th episode of the WTF podcast. This was the first appearance of President Obama's presidency on a web-based podcast, and the first appearance of a sitting president on an online podcast. The WTF Podcast was broadcast from Marc Maron's garage in Los Angeles, California. The conversation between Maron and President Obama covered a range of subjects, starting with the president's upbringing in Southern California and Hawaii then evolving into a discussion about the main issues which the administration was dealing with at the time including gun laws, universal healthcare and the current political divide in America. The President cited the Sandy Hook Elementary School shooting, the deadliest school shooting in U.S history, as an example of his frustrations with the current Senate at the time and their inability to act due to lobby groups like the National Rifle Association of America (NRA), and the effects of the inaction on public opinion.

The President then continued to speak on the disconnect between the daily lives of average Americans and what is being shown in the U.S media and how the current political system does not create space for ordinary conversations about politics. Obama then spoke about disappointing his supporters on certain policy issues and how his administrations rectified some of the actions that they took, citing the difficulties about the implementations of public healthcare and national defence. The conversation then switched to racial relations in America, referring to the 2015 Baltimore protests and the shooting of Michael Brown in Ferguson Missouri. The President then argued that it is "...incontrovertible that race relations have improved significantly..." and that the shadow of racist policy and attitudes is still prevalent in American institutions. The interview ended with Marc asking Obama about his father with Obama describing him as a "tragic figure" with the interview ending with Obama and Marc discussing the President's legacy and his "fearless mindset".

== Future direction ==
Political podcasts have experienced tremendous growth over the past few years, but activity may lessen after the 2016 presidential election in the United States. According to analyst Nicholas Quah of Harvard's Nieman Lab, political podcasts can take one of two routes: either increasing the frequency of their broadcasts to cover rapid new developments, or approaching topics more thematically in an effort to make each episode "less disposable." He proposed a hybrid model in which content from disposable interview-type podcasts can be used to update the archives of thematically-oriented content.

== See also ==
- List of American political podcasts
- List of daily news podcasts
