= Jon Favreau (speechwriter) =

American political pundit (born 1981)

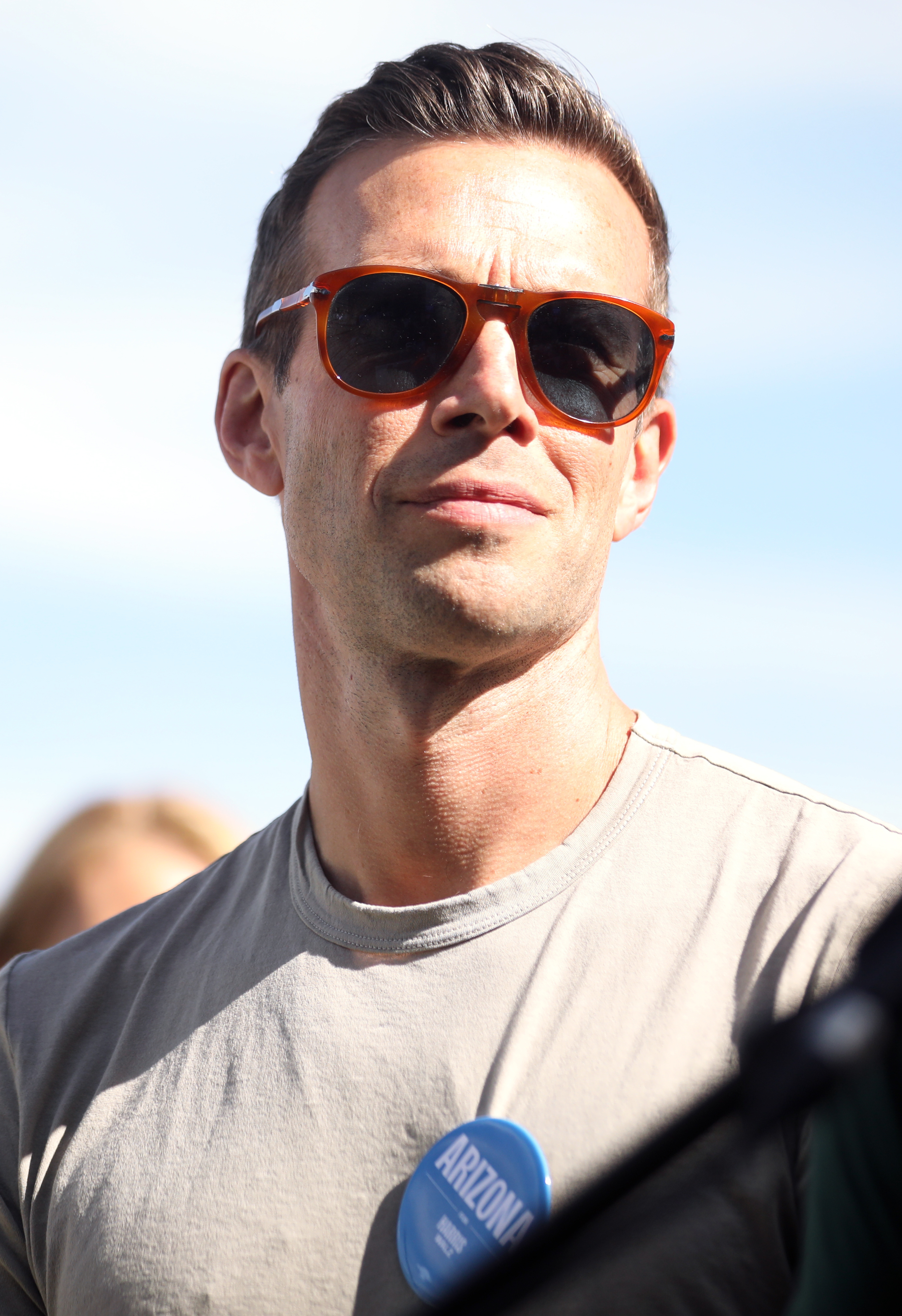
- Favreau in 2024

White House Director of Speechwriting
- In office January 20, 2009 – March 1, 2013
- President: Barack Obama
- Preceded by: Marc Thiessen
- Succeeded by: Cody Keenan

Personal details
- Born: Jonathan Edward Favreau; June 2, 1981 (age 45) Winchester, Massachusetts, U.S.
- Party: Democratic
- Spouse: Emily Favreau (m. 2017)
- Children: 2
- Education: College of the Holy Cross (BA)

Jonathan Edward Favreau (/ˈfævroʊ/; born June 2, 1981) is an American political commentator who served as White House director of speechwriting under U.S. president Barack Obama from 2009 to 2013. He co-founded the political podcast network Crooked Media with fellow former Obama staffers Tommy Vietor and Jon Lovett in 2017. Favreau co-hosts its flagship podcast, Pod Save America, with Vietor, Lovett, and Dan Pfeiffer.

== Early life and education ==
Favreau was born on June 2, 1981, in Winchester Hospital in Winchester, Massachusetts, and was raised in nearby North Reading, Massachusetts. He is the oldest child of Mark Favreau and Lillian DeMarkis, a schoolteacher. He is of French Canadian, Greek, and Italian descent. His grandfather, Robert J. Favreau, was a Republican state representative in New Hampshire. His uncle, Peter Favreau, was a police chief in Manchester, New Hampshire.

Favreau attended the College of the Holy Cross in Worcester, Massachusetts. He later recalled that "I took a lot of political science classes, a lot of sociology classes, and a lot of history classes" in college. As an undergraduate at Holy Cross, he was elected a class representative, served as the opinions editor of the school newspaper, The Crusader, and was chair of the college's College Democrats chapter. In his junior year, he interned at the press office of U.S. senator John Kerry in Washington, D.C., and was selected to ghostwrite several op-ed newspaper articles in Kerry's name. In his senior year, he was awarded a Harry S. Truman Scholarship for public service.

Favreau graduated from Holy Cross with a Bachelor of Arts with honors in political science in 2003 as class valedictorian. His valedictory speech was circulated among Kerry's staff, who offered him a position in Kerry's office. Massachusetts state senator Michael Knapik, with whom Favreau interned, described him as "very unassuming, but very, very bright".

== Political career ==
=== Kerry campaign ===
After graduating from the College of the Holy Cross, Favreau joined Senator John Kerry's 2004 presidential campaign. Following Kerry's defeat, Favreau became dispirited with politics, and was uncertain if he would do such work again. Favreau first met Obama (then an Illinois State Senator running for the U.S. Senate), while still working for Kerry, backstage at the 2004 Democratic National Convention as Obama was rehearsing his keynote address.

=== Obama campaign ===
Obama communications aide Robert Gibbs, who had worked for Kerry's campaign, recommended Favreau to Obama as an excellent writer, and in 2005 he began working for Barack Obama in his U.S. Senate office before joining his presidential campaign as chief speechwriter in 2006. His interview with Obama was on the Senator's first day. Favreau described his approach to Obama as, "A speech can broaden the circle of people who care about this stuff. How do you say to the average person that's been hurting: 'I hear you, I'm there?' Even though you've been so disappointed and cynical about politics in the past, and with good reason, we can move in the right direction. Just give me a chance."

Favreau led a speechwriting team for the campaign that included Ben Rhodes and Cody Keenan.

He has likened his position to "Ted Williams's batting coach", because of Obama's celebrated abilities as a speaker and writer. Obama senior adviser David Axelrod said of Favreau, "Barack trusts him... And Barack doesn't trust too many folks with that—the notion of surrendering that much authority over his own words." In Obama's own words, Favreau was his "mind reader".

Favreau has said that the speeches of Robert F. Kennedy and Michael Gerson have influenced his work, and has expressed admiration for Peggy Noonan's speechwriting, citing a talk given by Ronald Reagan at Pointe du Hoc as his favorite Noonan speech. Gerson also admires Favreau's work, and sought him out at an Obama New Hampshire campaign rally to speak with the younger speechwriter.

Favreau was the primary writer of Obama's inauguration address of January 2009.

=== White House Director of Speechwriting (2009–2013) ===
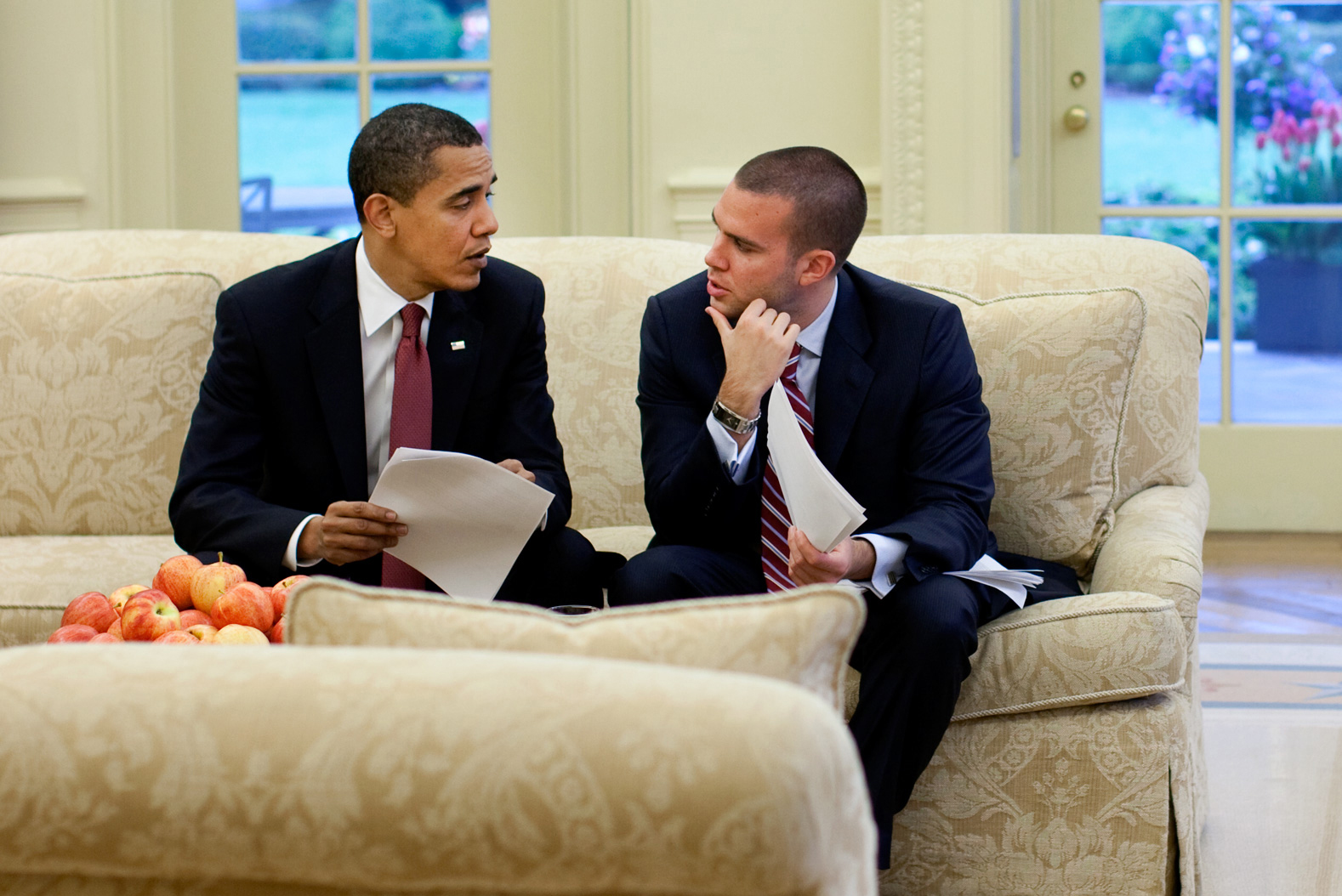
President Barack Obama meets with Favreau, in the Oval Office, to review a speech on April 14, 2009.

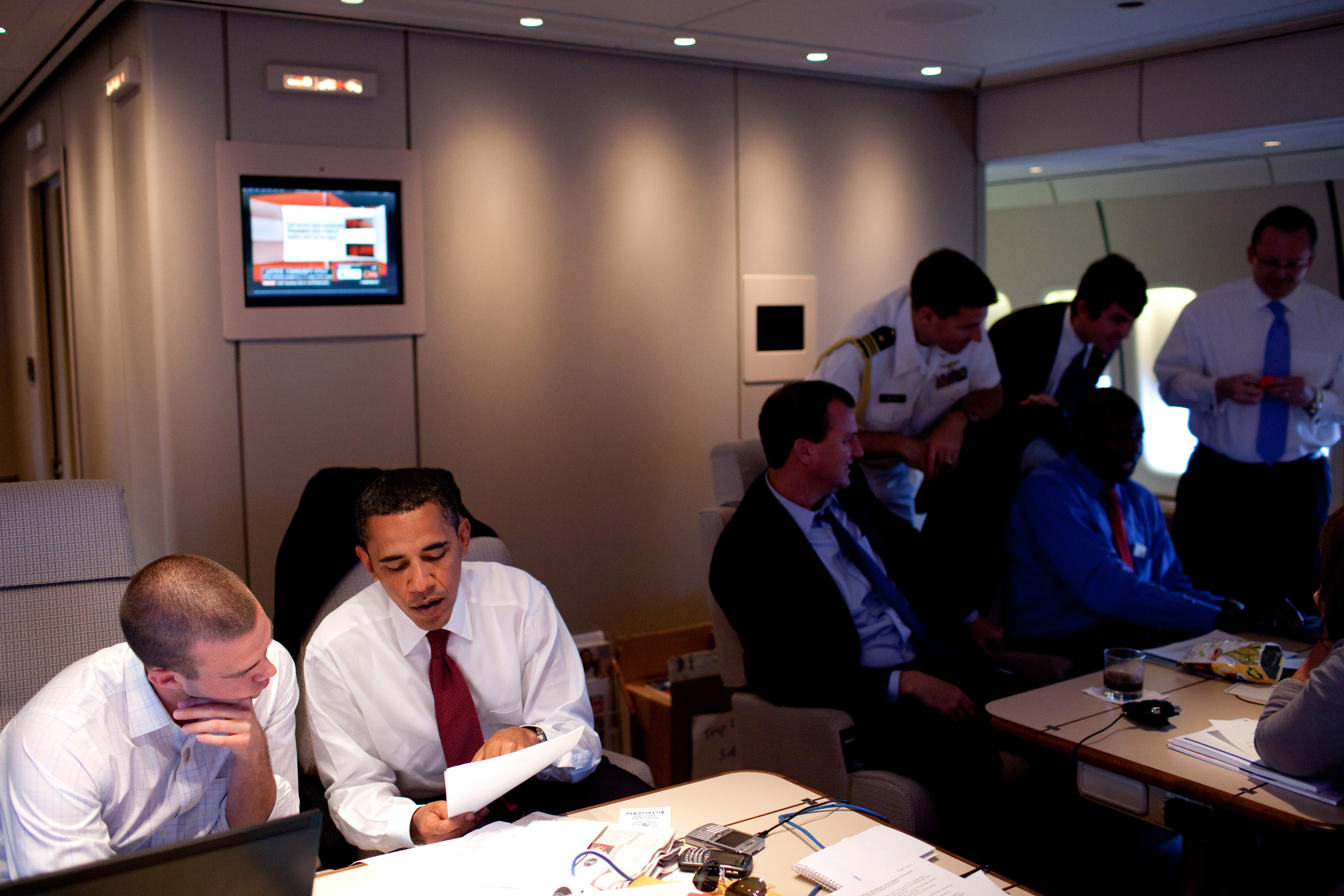
Obama works with Favreau on the President's Normandy speech aboard Air Force One en route to Paris on June 5, 2009.

When President Obama assumed office in 2009, Favreau was appointed Assistant to the President and Director of Speechwriting. He became the second-youngest chief White House speechwriter on record, after James Fallows. His salary was $172,200 a year. Obama nicknamed him "Favs".

Favreau has said his work with Obama will be his final job in the realm of politics, saying, "Anything else would be anticlimactic." In regard to his post-political future, he said, "Maybe I'll write a screenplay, or maybe a fiction book based loosely on what all of this was like. You had a bunch of kids working on this campaign together, and it was such a mix of the serious and momentous and just the silly ways that we are. For people in my generation, it was an unbelievable way to grow up."

== After the White House ==
In March 2013, Favreau left the White House, along with Tommy Vietor, to pursue a career in private sector consulting and screenwriting. Together, they founded the communications firm Fenway Strategies. From 2013 to 2016, Favreau wrote sporadically for the Daily Beast. In 2016, after the November presidential election was won by Donald Trump, Favreau, Vietor and Jon Lovett founded the progressive commentary outlet Crooked Media. Favreau co-hosts Crooked's premier political podcast Pod Save America with Dan Pfeiffer, Vietor and Lovett. In the wake of the new Republican healthcare bill, the AHCA, he coined the term "Wealthcare".

He currently serves on the Board of Advisors of Let America Vote, a voting rights organization founded by fellow Crooked Media host Jason Kander.

== Accolades ==
Favreau was named one of the "100 Most Influential People in the World" by Time magazine in 2009. In the same year he was ranked 33rd in the GQ "50 Most Powerful in D.C." and featured in the Vanity Fair "Next Establishment" list. Favreau was one of several Obama administration members in the 2009 "World's Most Beautiful People" issue of People magazine. On May 23, 2014, Favreau was awarded an honorary Doctor of Public Service degree by his alma mater, Holy Cross, where he also gave the commencement address. As executive producer for the podcast This Land, he was nominated for a 2021 Peabody Award. As host of Pod Save America, Favreau has won several Webby Awards.

== Personal life ==
He is the older brother of Andy Favreau, a professional TV and movie actor, and is Catholic. He married Emily Black, now Favreau, daughter of federal Judge Timothy Black, on June 17, 2017, at her family's vacation home in Biddeford Pool, Maine. The couple have two sons: Charlie, born in August 2020, and Teddy, born in December 2023.
