= Archewell =

Beverly Hills-based business organization group

- Named after: A compound of the Ancient Greek word 'arche' and the English word 'well'
- Formation: October 2020; 6 years ago
- Founder: The Duke and Duchess of Sussex
- Type: For-profit and non-profit foundation T30 Public organization 501(c)(3)
- Tax ID no.: 85-2213963
- Purpose: Non-profit activities Creative for-profit media ventures
- Headquarters: Suite 500; 9665 Wilshire Boulevard, Beverly Hills, California 90212
- Region served: US
- Services: Advertising and Business
- Official language: English
- Subsidiaries: Archewell Audio; Archewell Productions
- Website: Archewell Philanthropies; Archewell Productions

Archewell Inc. is a Beverly Hills-based mix of for-profit and not-for-profit business organizations registered in Delaware and founded in 2020 by Prince Harry, Duke of Sussex, and Meghan, Duchess of Sussex. The group includes the couple's non-profit charitable foundation, as well as for-profit business divisions focusing on media production, Archewell Audio and Archewell Productions.

== History ==
=== Sussex Royal ===
On July 1, 2019, Harry and Meghan registered a private company limited by guarantee in England and Wales under the title 'Sussex Royal The Foundation of The Duke and Duchess of Sussex', alternatively referred to as Sussex Royal Foundation. However, after a meeting with senior members of the British royal family, it was confirmed on February 21, 2020, that the couple would not use 'Sussex Royal' as a brand name after they stepped down as working royals at the end of March 2020. Even so, the namesake website remains visible online. On August 5, 2020, Sussex Royal Foundation was renamed 'MWX Foundation' and dissolved the same day.

=== Formation and trademarks ===
On March 3, 2020, an International Class 35 trademark application for the name 'Archewell' was submitted for registration with the United States Patent and Trademark Office (USPTO) by Cobblestone Lane LLC, which is registered in Delaware but linked to the Beverly Hills offices of Richard Genow, a lawyer who has worked for Meghan for years. A second logo with "the letters AW on top of each other" was registered under a different Delaware firm, IPHW LLC. The description of services for Trademark Class 35 is advertising, business management, organization and administration and office functions. The Duke and Duchess reportedly "filed paperwork to create 'their own charity and volunteering services, wide-ranging website, and sharing 'education and training materials' via films, podcasts and books' and requested to trademark a number of things including motion picture films and branded objects."

On May 26, USPTO assigned an examiner to review the application, and an 'Irregularity notice' was reportedly sent addressing errors, including the vague nature of the proposed charitable work, according to documents. Such notice read: 'The wording "providing a website featuring content relating to philanthropy, monetary giving, volunteer and career opportunities" in International Class 35 is also indefinite and over broad, and must be clarified to specify the nature of the content provided.' The notice allowed until August for changes to be made.

Archewell's website was "officially launched" in October 2020. Although it was reported in April 2020 that Archewell would focus on issues including "conservation, female empowerment, and gender equality", this had not been confirmed by the organization. At the end of December 2020, the website was changed to reflect the nature of their charitable and commercial endeavors.

In March 2021, it was reported that lawyers for the couple had blocked the trademark registration of Archewell Harvatera, a Philippine brand of tawas deodorant that had filed a trademark application in July 2020. In July 2021, the organization was told their trademark application would require further revisions. Among them was requested clarification that the group's audio branch would provide "entertainment-based services"; lawyers were also asked to "specify the nature" of "live stage performances" included in its list of prospective activities. Their foundation was also asked to "define the kind of web apps they wish to provide" as listed in their purported functions.

In November 2021 and in parallel with the 2021 United Nations Climate Change Conference, the foundation announced they would become net zero by 2030.

=== Finances ===
According to the organization's spokesperson, Archewell had no financial activity in 2020 and its first bank account was opened in January 2021. The gross amount of money raised by the charity was around $50,000 in 2020. In January 2023, the organization published an impact report of its activities between 2020 and 2022. The foundation was launched with an initial start-up revenue of $13 million in 2021, with a further $2 million raised in the same year. $3 million was donated to different causes such as refugee resettlement, procuring COVID-19 vaccines, funding academic fellows, and supporting humanitarian relief centers. The foundation's tax returns for 2021 showed that $3 million was given to the foundation anonymously, whilst $10 million came from the Silicon Valley Community Foundation (recorded in 2021 Form 990 of SVCF), while Harry and Meghan each worked the nominal amount of 52 hours in the year or one hour per week, a standard practice for directors of U.S. tax-exempt organizations. Archewell raised less than $4,500 in public donations. In 2022, the foundation raised $2 million in charitable contributions. A total of $1.2 million was donated to various causes, such as the HALO Trust ($100,000), a civil rights foundation ($125,000), a Washington "gender justice" project ($200,000), and a project that encourages ethical technology usage ($100,000). The foundation's expenses exceeded its revenue in 2022, by $674,000, though it still held $8.3 million in assets and cash. James Holt, the organization's executive director, received a salary of $228,500, plus a bonus of $26,356, which, compared to his 2021 income of less than $60,000, was a 280% rise. The organization generated $5.3 million in revenue in 2023, awarded $1.3 million in grants, and had $11.2 million in available funds, according to unaudited numbers included in their impact report. Grants were distributed to Ashley Biden's Women's Wellness (Spa)ce ($250,000), Humanity Crew ($130,000), The Markup ($90,000), NAACP ($125,000), aid workers in Israel and Gaza ($50,000) and in Turkey and Syria ($80,000).

In May 2024, Archewell received a "delinquency notice" from California's attorney general, which prohibited the charity from raising money. The notice was issued as the organization failed to submit all the documents and fees related to its 2022 tax return on time, with the foundation stating that an initial cheque sent for the amount owed had been lost in the mail and a further cheque had been sent to resolve the issue. The matter was resolved within the same month, with the organization described by the Registry of Charities and Fundraisers as "current and in good standing".

=== Etymology ===
In April 2020, Meghan and Harry confirmed that their US-headquartered non-royal foundation would be called 'Archewell'. The name stems from the Ancient Greek word 'arche', which means 'source of action' compounded with the English word 'well'. They had drawn inspiration from the word 'arche' when naming their son Archie.

=== Taxonomy ===
The National Taxonomy of Exempt Entities (NTEE) is a classification system for non-profit organizations developed by the NCSS. Archewell comes under 'NTEE T30 Public Organizations', which typically have grantmaking as a main focus.

=== Publicity and structure ===
In November 2020, former communications head at Pinterest and former Apple corporate communications manager Christine Schirmer was recruited for Archewell's publicity team. Others include Toya Holness, who led communications at the New York City Department of Education, and James Holt (Harry and Meghan's communications lead in the United Kingdom). It was reported that PR agency Sunshine Sachs will work with Schirmer, Holness and Holt as they oversee Archewell ventures. Holt later replaced Catherine St Laurent as the foundation's executive director in March 2021, while St Laurent remained affiliated with the organization as a senior adviser. Around the same time, Invisible Hand, a social impact agency founded by Genevieve Roth (who worked on Hillary Clinton’s 2016 presidential campaign), started collaborating with Archewell on initiatives and campaigns, and Roth was appointed a senior strategic advisor. In June 2021, tech and media executive Mandana Dayani joined the foundation as its first chief operating officer. In September 2021, former Sony Pictures executive Fara Taylor was hired as head of marketing for all of the company's three divisions; she left her position in 2023. In the same year, the company hired Miranda Barbot, a former employee of Barack Obama. In May 2022, Ashley Momtaheni Hansen, the VP of Global Communications and Media Relations at the Universal Filmed Entertainment Group, was named as the person who would lead Archewell's Global Communications. In the same month, Toya Holness left her position as head of communications. In September 2022, it was announced that Sunshine Sachs would no longer represent them.

In December 2022, Mandana Dayani, who had been the president of Archewell, resigned following a planned departure where the Duke and Duchess would come off parental leave and jointly take over the role. In January 2023, Shauna Nep was named as co-executive director to work alongside executive director James Holt. Miranda Barbot joined the foundation as director of global communications and press secretary, while Maren Thomas was named manager of communications, and will work alongside Deesha Tank. Barbot was promoted to vice president of programs and media operations in 2024 and her previous position was filled by Kyle Boulia and Charlie Gipson as deputy press secretary and point of contact for UK and European media outlets, respectively. In October 2024 it was announced that Ashley Hansen who previously served as Harry and Meghan's chief spokesperson had signed the couple as clients for her PR consultancy firm and would oversee Archewell's philanthropic work and creative projects. Hansen was succeeded by Meredith Maines as chief communications officer and Shahed Fakhari Larson as outside strategic communications counsel.

In December 2025, Archewell Foundation was rebranded as Archewell Philanthropies, with the organization still operating within a nonprofit structure, but now through a fiscal sponsorship model. The move led to staff layoffs, which the organization's spokesperson described as "inevitable ... particularly with junior admin roles". In the same month James Holt stepped down from his role as executive director of Archewell Foundation, though it was announced he would provide input as senior philanthropic advisor for Archewell Philanthropies in the future.

== Charitable activities ==
=== Archewell Philanthropies (formerly Archewell Foundation) ===
In December 2020, a partnership with José Andrés's World Central Kitchen was announced. Archewell agreed to fund "Community Relief Centers" to act as "quickly activated service kitchens". The first was opened in Dominica in early 2021. Other locations planned included Puerto Rico and Mumbai and they helped to get a kitchen up and running close to the Ukraine and Poland border, within 12 hours of the Russian invasion.

In the same month, Archewell disclosed collaborations with multiple organizations. It was announced that Archewell had 'partnered' with neurosurgeon James Doty from Stanford University to support his center's research on "promoting altruism" in society. Other affiliations include the Loveland Foundation, which provides mental health resources to black women, and the Center for Humane Technology, which promotes ethical technology use.

Following a winter storm in North America in mid-February, which caused damage to several facilities, the foundation made a donation to the Genesis Women's Shelter in Dallas to cover the costs for the roof of the shelter's transitional facility. Archewell was one of the initial donors of the PressPad Charitable Foundation, which aims to "improve socio-economic diversity within the media". In March 2021, Archewell named the PressPad Charitable Foundation, along with the civil rights and racial justice organization Color of Change, the UK-based mental health charity Mind, and multi-platform network URL Media, as the organizations to which they would offer support. In May 2021, to mark Mother's Day in the United States, the foundation together with Procter & Gamble made donations to Harvest Home, a charity that helps expectant mothers dealing with domestic violence, substance use and homelessness and provided them with diapers for a year and cleaning supplies. Later in the same month, the foundation announced a multi-year global partnership with Procter & Gamble to address issues related to "gender equality, more inclusive online spaces, and resilience and impact through sport".

In August 2021, to mark her 40th birthday, Meghan launched 40x40, a campaign that asks people around the world to spend 40 minutes of their time mentoring women re-entering the workforce and combating the outsized economic impact of the COVID-19 pandemic on women. Among people who joined the initiative were Melissa McCarthy, Adele, Amanda Gorman, Ibram X. Kendi, and Gloria Steinem. In the same month the organization partnered with Women for Afghan Women to help with the evacuation of thousands of Afghan women and children during the 2021 Taliban offensive, while also assisting World Central Kitchen with delivering meals to hospitals and shelters for those affected by the 2021 Haiti earthquake. In December 2021 and ahead of Christmas, the foundation made donations to charities supporting Afghan families displaced after the 2021 Taliban offensive and organizations advocating for paid parental leave, including Team Rubicon, the Human First Coalition and the Marshall Plan for Moms. In recognition of their support for Afghan refugees, the foundation received the Partner Organization Award by the Human First Coalition.

In February 2022, the foundation partnered with NAACP to offer the NAACP-Archewell Digital Civil Rights Award at the annual NAACP Image Awards to recognize leaders in technology and social justice who are making a difference. The award will be given along with a $100,000 prize. In March 2022 to mark the Women's History Month, the foundation made grants to Smart Works, The 19th, the National Women's Law Center and the Center on Poverty and Inequality at Georgetown University Law Center. In the same month, Archewell invested in the People's Vaccine Alliance, a coalition made up of over 90 organizations that advocates for free global access to vaccines. Amid the 2022 Russian invasion of Ukraine, the foundation also made donations to charities that support Ukrainian people, including HIAS (Helping Ukrainian Families Settle), the World Health Organization, World Central Kitchen, the HALO Trust and Project Healthy Minds, as well as media platforms that fight against misinformation such as The Kyiv Independent and Are We Europe.

In April 2022, Archewell announced a partnership and offered grants to Cortico—Local Voices Network (from MIT Media Lab) and The Institute for Rebooting Social Media at Harvard's Berkman Klein Center for Internet & Society. In May 2022, the Marshall Plan for Moms announced the National Business Coalition for Child Care, which includes Archewell. The initiative aims to expand child care support for workers. In October 2022, the foundation announced a partnership with the VING Project, asking individuals between 14 and 18 to nominate inspiring women in need of financial assistance, who will be granted $1,000 each. In the same month, it was reported that the foundation had partnered with KaBOOM! and the City of Uvalde for the DeLeon Park playground project, which saw the building of a community play space for children and families recovering from the Robb Elementary School shooting. The foundation later announced donations to Save the Children and UNICEF Nigeria to assist communities affected by the 2022 Nigeria floods. In December 2022, the foundation announced a partnership with Robert F. Kennedy Human Rights to establish the Archewell Foundation Award for Gender Equity in Student Film.

In February 2023, Archewell became a founding member of the Responsible Technology Youth Power Fund, an initiative aimed at helping youth and intergenerational organizations that are part of the responsible technology movement. The fund raised $2 million and selected charities received between $25,000 and $200,000 each. In March 2023 and to mark the International Women's Day, the foundation made a donation to the charity Harvest Home. In September 2023, it was announced that Archewell had joined an initiative by the MacArthur Foundation called Press Forward to help fund and develop models for sustaining local news coverage. Other activities undertaken by the foundation in 2023 included providing school supplies and menstrual products for 2,500 girls in Nigeria through a partnership with the GEANCO Foundation and replacing stolen items at the Inkwenkwezi Early Childhood Development Centre in Nyanga. Inspired by Meghan's connection to the Hubb Community Kitchen for the Grenfell Tower fire survivors, the foundation launched the Welcome Project at 11 different sites in the US to serve as a community group for displaced Afghan women.

The foundation partnered with Moms First (formerly Marshall Plan for Moms) and the Geena Davis Institute on Gender in Media to publish the results of a study on television mothers in February 2024, which highlighted issues such as lack of diversity in roles, underrepresenting mothers as earners, and downplaying the realities of keeping a house running and taking care of children. In May 2024, it was announced that the Archewell Foundation and Giants of Africa would fund the construction of a basketball court in Abuja. Later in August, Archewell launched the Parents' Network to provide support to parents whose children had been harmed through exposure to social media. In the same month and following Harry and Meghan's visit to Colombia, the foundation announced initiatives to donate new drumming sets to Escuela Tambores de Cabildo in Cartagena, invest in programs concerning culture and children in San Basilio de Palenque, and support the expansion of the socio-emotional Gym program at Colegio La Giralda in Bogotá. Following the January 2025 Southern California wildfires, the organization made donations to relief efforts, including Altadena Girls Fire Recovery Fund which aims to help young girls by providing them with essentials such as clothes, personal items, beauty and hair care products. In April 2025, Archewell ceased donations to Milwaukee Muslim Women's Coalition after anti-Israel comments made by the latter's founder resurfaced in the media. In May 2025, the Archewell Foundation, in conjunction with M&C Saatchi, ran a campaign to raise awareness of online harm, particularly aimed at young people.

In September 2025, the foundation declared that it would donate $150,000 to the charity Save the Children to continue humanitarian aid in Gaza, $200,000 to the World Health Organization to support medical evacuations from Gaza to Jordan, and $150,000 to the Centre of Blast Injury Studies, which is a division of the Centre for Injury Studies at the Imperial College London, to support its efforts to create prostheses that can help injured children. In October 2025, it was reported that the foundation's Parents' Network had partnered with ParentsTogether to advocate for families and online safety amid increasing use of AI. In December of the same year, a spokesperson for the organization confirmed that they had partnered with numerous fundraising partners over the years, including CharityBuzz. In January 2026, it was reported that the organization's Parents' Network initiative had been transferred to the nonprofit ParentsTogether along with a cash grant to cover the first year of core operations.

In October 2026, Meghan helped design a limited-edition sweatshirt in partnership with the nonprofit Moms Offering More, with Archewell Philanthropies supporting the initiative to raise funds for organizations serving mothers and families in need.

=== Archewell Foundation Fund ===
As of January 2021, "Archewell Foundation is establishing the Archewell Foundation Fund" to support the goals of the UCLA Center for Critical Internet Inquiry (C2I2) in the technology sector.

== For-profit media ventures ==
=== Archewell Audio ===
In December 2020, it was reported that the founders had signed a multi-year business deal with Spotify to launch a podcast through audio-producing company, Archewell Audio, a subsidiary of Archewell Inc. Its first episode was released on December 29, 2020, with guests including Stacey Abrams, Christina Adane, José Andrés, Brené Brown, Rachel Cargle, Deepak Chopra, James Corden, Matt Haig, Sir Elton John, Hussain Manawer, Naomi Osaka, Tyler Perry, and George the Poet. In July 2021, it was reported that podcaster Rebecca Sananés had been hired as head of Archewell Audio. In January 2022, it was reported that Spotify had started efforts for expanding the couple's podcast team through "advertising for in-house staff" and hiring producers that would work with Archewell Audio via Gimlet Media. In the same month and following criticism aimed at Spotify about how they dealt with COVID-19 misinformation, Harry and Meghan made an announcement stating that since April 2021 they had begun "expressing concerns" about the issue on the platform. In March 2022 and amid "encouraging" conversations with Spotify on tackling misinformation, it was announced that Meghan's first podcast series would be launched in the summer of 2022. Archetypes premiered in August 2022 and consisted of a single season of 12 episodes. Harry was also reported to have been keen on producing podcasts centered around childhood trauma, fatherhood, and major societal conversations where he could interview figures such as Vladimir Putin, Mark Zuckerberg, Donald Trump, and Pope Francis. He also explored the idea of producing a podcast on veterans and co-hosting a show with Hasan Minhaj. Other ideas pitched to Harry included one where he would review a different hot chocolate each week while talking with a friend, while another would have involved him "fixing" something each week, ranging from a flat tire to global warming. However, in June 2023, Spotify ended their deal with the couple to produce podcasts. In February 2024, Meghan announced a new deal with Lemonada Media, who would redistribute Archetypes on all audio platforms and work with her on developing a new podcast series. Her next podcast series, titled Confessions of a Female Founder, premiered on April 8, 2025.

Rebecca Sananès, who had been the head of Archewell Audio since July 2021, resigned in December 2022, and was replaced by Serena Regan.

==== Audio works ====
Year	Title	Category	Platform	Notes	Ref.
2022	Archetypes	Podcast	Spotify	The Pop Podcast of 2022 (48th People's Choice Awards)	
2025	Confessions of a Female Founder	Podcast	Lemonada		

=== Archewell Productions ===
In September 2020, Harry and Meghan signed a five-year commercial deal with Netflix "to develop scripted and unscripted series, film, documentaries, and children's programming for the streaming service". The program aims to "utilize the power of storytelling to embrace our shared humanity and duty to truth through a compassionate lens". In March 2021, it was reported that Ben Browning, president of FilmNation Entertainment, had been hired as head of content to lead the project; he left his position in March 2023. He was succeeded by Chanel Pysnik, a former Disney+ executive hired in 2021 to oversee nonfiction series and documentary film productions, as well as Bennett Levine, who joined the team as coordinator and left his position in January 2024. Nishika Kumble, a former developer at Le Train Productions and 26 Keys Productions, was hired in August 2021 as senior vice president of scripted TV. Actress and producer Tracy Ryerson later joined as head of scripted content in 2023. In November 2026, it was reported that Pysnik was departing Archewell Productions after approximately five and a half years as head of nonfiction, film & TV, with no immediate replacement named.

In April 2021, it was announced that the company's first project with Netflix would be Heart of Invictus, a documentary series in partnership with The Invictus Games Foundation which was released in 2023. The project surrounded the competitors from the 2020 Invictus Games and was directed by Orlando von Einsiedel and produced by Joanna Natasegara. Harry executive produced the series and appeared on camera. Their second project, Pearl, was announced in July 2021. The animated series was originally pitched to Netflix in 2018 while Meghan was still a working member of the royal family. It would be about the adventures of a 12-year-old girl who is inspired by influential women from history. Meghan was set to executive producer the series alongside David Furnish, Carolyn Soper, Liz Garbus, Dan Cogan, and Amanda Rynda. Rynda would also serve as the showrunner. In May 2022, it was announced that Pearl had been canceled, but Harry and Meghan would still collaborate on future projects with Netflix. Later on British author Mel Elliot stated that she had sent legal letters to Archewell and Netflix, claiming that the project could infringe her copyright as the storyline was too similar to her Pearl Power book series.

In an interview published in October 2022, Meghan announced that she and Harry were working on a docuseries focused on their life, which is directed by Liz Garbus. On December 1, 2022, the title of the docuseries was announced as Harry & Meghan. The couple also served as executive producers and presenters for the docuseries Live to Lead, which was released on December 31, 2022. In February 2023, The Telegraph reported that for their future projects the couple would focus on "fictional, scripted content" and serve as executive producers for rom coms and "light-hearted" programs. In August 2023, it was confirmed that the company had acquired rights to Carley Fortune's book Meet Me at the Lake. In February 2024, Bela Bajaria, Netflix's chief content officer, confirmed that the production firm was working on a movie, a scripted series and some more unscripted content. In April 2024, it was reported that the company was in the process of developing two non-fiction projects. One would be a cooking and gardening show featuring Meghan and produced by The Intellectual Property Corporation. The other show, produced by Boardwalk Pictures, would focus on polo as a professional sport showcasing the U.S. Open Polo Championship. Polo was released in December 2024 and With Love, Meghan in March 2025.

In August 2025, Archewell Productions renewed its partnership with Netflix under a multi-year first-look deal, which included plans for a holiday special of With Love, Meghan, as well as further development of Meghan's As Ever brand and other documentary and scripted projects, including Masaka Kids, A Rhythm Within. In December 2025, the company announced that it would produce a film adaptation of Jasmine Guillory's The Wedding Date for Netflix, which was early in development at the time. In March 2026, it was announced that Archewell Productions and Fake Empire were developing a polo-themed scripted drama series. In May of the same year, it was reported that Archewell Productions was developing a feature film adaptation of the Afghan war memoir No Way Out: The Searing True Story of Men Under Siege by Major Adam Jowett for Netflix, with screenwriter Matt Charman attached.

==== Filmography ====
Year	Title	Category	Network	Ref.
2022	Harry & Meghan	Documentary series	Netflix	
2022	Live to Lead	Documentary series	Netflix	
2023	Heart of Invictus	Documentary series	Netflix	
2024	Polo	Documentary series	Netflix	
2025	With Love, Meghan	Lifestyle series	Netflix	
2025	Masaka Kids, A Rhythm Within	Documentary series	Netflix	
2026	Cookie Queens	Documentary series	—N/a	
