= Jessica Cordova Kramer =

American media producer and executive

Jessica Cordova Kramer is an American media producer and entrepreneur. She is CEO the podcast company Lemonada Media, which she cofounded with Stephanie Wittels Wachs. Kramer is also executive producer for many of Lemonada's podcasts, including Last Day, Everything Happens with Kate Bowler, and Wiser Than Me with Julia Louis-Dreyfus. Kramer was also the founding executive producer of the podcast Pod Save the People, from Crooked Media.

== Education ==
Kramer attended New York University as an undergraduate. She attended law school at Georgetown University.

== Career ==
=== Pod Save the People (Crooked Media) ===
In 2017, Kramer became the executive producer for the successful Crooked Media podcast Pod Save the People, which is hosted by activist DeRay McKesson with Kaya Henderson, Myles Johnson and De'Ara Balenger. In her role as executive producer, Kramer won several industry awards including 3 Webby Awards for Best News & Politics Podcast.

=== Lemonada Media ===
Kramer is the CEO of podcast company Lemonada Media, which she co-founded with Stephanie Wittels Wachs. Kramer met Wachs after hearing her interviewed on the podcast Terrible, Thanks for Asking, where Wachs talked about losing her younger brother, the comedian Harris Wittels, to a heroin overdose. Kramer also lost her younger brother to an accidental opioid overdose.

Kramer sent Wachs an email, inviting her to be a guest on Pod Save the People, where Kramer was executive producer. Wittels Wachs initially declined. A few months later, the two met on a call. They decided to collaborate on the podcast Last Day. Last Day covers the opioid crisis, from a personal perspective. It's hosted by Wachs. The show premiered in October 2019. Kramer and Waches simultaneously launched the company Lemonada Media. As of 2023, Lemonada has launched more than 40 podcasts.

In her role as executive producer, Kramer has earned numerous podcast industry awards, including 3 Webby Awards for Being Trans / Being Golden , the Webby Award for Best Health, Wellness & Lifestyle podcast for In the Bubble, 3 Webby honors for Last Day and the Apple Best Podcast of the Year for Wiser than Me with Julia Louis-Dreyfus.
