= List of American University Washington College of Law alumni =

Following is a list of notable alumni of the American University Washington College of Law.

== Academia ==
- Anthony Crowell, dean of New York Law School
- Juliane Kokott, professor at the University of St. Gallen in Switzerland and German Advocate General at the Court of Justice of the European Communities
- M. Peter McPherson, president of Michigan State University, chairman of Dow Jones, head of United States Agency for International Development

== Business ==
- Louis Dubin, real estate developer
- Gregory D. Hague, real estate entrepreneur
- M. Peter McPherson, chairman of Dow Jones, president of Michigan State University, and head of United States Agency for International Development

== Entertainment ==
- Roy Lee, film producer known for The Departed and The Ring
- Crystal McCrary McGuire, film producer, and director known for Little Ballers
- Judy Sheindlin, TV judge (Judge Judy) (later transferred to the New York Law School)
- Judy Smith, television producer
- Sarah Stewart Holland, host of the podcast Pantsuit Politics

== Government ==
- M. Peter McPherson, head of United States Agency for International Development, chairman of Dow Jones, and president of Michigan State University
- Walter Shaub, director of the United States Office of Government Ethics
- Hugo Teufel III, former chief privacy officer of the Department of Homeland Security
- Flora Warren Seymour, attorney, writer, historian, first woman on the Board of Indian Commissioners
- Nury Turkel – attorney; former Chair of the United States Commission on International Religious Freedom; author of No Escape: The True Story of China's Genocide of the Uyghurs

== Judiciary ==
=== Federal ===
- George Arceneaux, judge, United States District Court for the Eastern District of Louisiana
- Sarah Evans Barker, judge, United States District Court for the Southern District of Indiana
- Margaret Bartley, chief judge, United States Court of Appeals for Veterans Claims
- Terrence Boyle, judge, United States District Court for the Eastern District of North Carolina
- June Lazenby Green, judge, United States District Court for the District of Columbia
- Claude M. Hilton, judge, United States District Court for the Eastern District of Virginia
- Henry E. Hudson, judge, United States District Court for the Eastern District of Virginia
- C. Darnell Jones II, judge, United States District Court for the Eastern District of Pennsylvania
- Gerald Bruce Lee, judge, United States District Court for the Eastern District of Virginia
- Sharon Prost, chief judge, United States Court of Appeals for the Federal Circuit
- Robert W. Schroeder III, judge, United States District Court for the Eastern District of Texas
- Margaret B. Seymour, judge, United States District Court for the District of South Carolina
- Moody R. Tidwell III, judge, United States Court of Federal Claims
- Reggie Walton, judge, United States District Court for the District of Columbia

=== State ===
- Michael W. Farrell, judge, District of Columbia Court of Appeals
- C. Darnell Jones II, judge First Judicial District of Pennsylvania
- Warren R. King, judge, District of Columbia Court of Appeals
- Michael J. Lindner, judge, Fairfax General District Court, Virginia
- Thomas P. Mann, justice, Supreme Court of Virginia
- Frank Q. Nebeker, judge, District of Columbia Court of Appeals and United States Court of Appeals for Veterans Claims
- Warren Silver, judge, Maine Supreme Judicial Court
- Zuberi Williams, associate judge, Montgomery County, District Court of Maryland

=== International ===
- Maria Filomena Singh, associate justice of the Supreme Court of the Philippines

== Law ==
- Tom Goldstein, co-founder of the firm Goldstein and Howe, and co-founder of Scotusblog
- Joseph T. Kelliher, energy executive and former chairman of the Federal Energy Regulatory Commission (FERC)
- Stephen Latchford, earliest U.S. expert on aviation law who worked for the U.S. State Department
- Sophia A. Nelson, legal counsel to New Jersey Governor Christine Todd Whitman and GOP counsel for the House Government Reform and Oversight Committee
- Nanette B. Paul, legal scholar, lawyer, suffragist, author, instructor, lecturer
- Darrell F. Smith, former attorney general of Arizona
- Camille Stewart, cybersecurity attorney

== Nonprofit and advocacy ==
- Ilan Berman, vice president of the American Foreign Policy Council
- Manjaagiin Ichinnorov, Mongolian human rights activist
- Alice Paul, suffragist

== Politics ==
=== Diplomacy ===
- Suriya Evans-Pritchard Jayanti, diplomat, U.S. Department of State
- Addie Viola Smith (1983–1975), attorney and trade commissioner in Shanghai
- Richard Verma, United States ambassador to India

=== Federal ===
- Robert Byrd, former United States senator
- Thomas Downey, former member, U.S. House of Representatives
- Peter Feldman, chairman of the U.S. Consumer Product Safety Commission
- Gwen Graham, member, U.S. House of Representatives
- Rick Lazio, U.S. House of Representatives
- Raymond Muir, White House chief usher and deputy chief of Protocol, U.S. Department of State (1943–1954)
- Stacey Plaskett, member, U.S. House of Representatives
- Nick Rathod, former White House special assistant and deputy director of Intergovernmental Affairs to President Obama
- Peter J. White, senior policy advisor to President Donald Trump

=== State ===
- Toney Anaya, former governor of New Mexico
- Colin Bell, former New Jersey senate
- Kathy Boockvar, secretary of the Commonwealth of Pennsylvania
- Eileen Filler-Corn, former speaker of the Virginia House of Delegates
- Kim Guadagno, lieutenant governor of New Jersey
- Alison Lundergan Grimes, Kentucky secretary of state
- Frank Hall, minority leader of the Virginia House of Delegates
- Juan Mari Brás, Puerto Rico political leader
- David Moon, state delegate, Maryland House of Delegates
- Kirill Reznik, state delegate, Maryland House of Delegates
- Marcus Simon, member of the Virginia House of Delegates
- Robert White, at-large member of the Council of the District of Columbia

=== International ===
- Masoud bin Mohammed Al Ameri, Qatari minister of Justice
- Ivan Duque, president of Colombia
- Karin Elharar, Israeli Knesset member for the Yesh Atid party and chair of the State Control Committee of the Knesset
- Vekuii Rukoro, paramount chief of the Herero people, Namibia

=== Other ===
- Nicholas Sarwark, chairman of the Libertarian National Committee

== Sports ==
- Avram Glazer, NFL owner of Tampa Bay Buccaneers and majority owner of Manchester United F.C.
- Ed Tapscott, former interim head coach of the Washington Wizards NBA team
