= Confessions of a Female Founder =

Society and culture podcast

- Genre: Business; technology; interview
- Language: English

Cast and voices
- Hosted by: Meghan, Duchess of Sussex

Music
- Opening theme: "Crabbuckit"

Production
- Production: Archewell Audio; Lemonada Media
- Length: 50 min

Publication
- No. of episodes: 9
- Original release: April 8 – June 3, 2025

Related
- Website: lemonadamedia.com

Confessions of a Female Founder is a podcast produced by Archewell Audio Productions and hosted by Meghan, Duchess of Sussex. The podcast debuted on April 8, 2025, and features Meghan talking with female founders and friends who have started their own companies and brands. Also discussed is Meghan's own experience as an entrepreneur launching her brand, As Ever.

It was reported at the completion of the series that a second series was not forthcoming.

== Production ==
In February 2024, Meghan announced a new deal with Lemonada Media, who would redistribute her previous podcast Archetypes on all audio platforms and work with her on developing a new podcast series. Confessions of a Female Founder consisted of nine episodes that were released weekly. On the podcast's launch, Meghan said that her aim was to "dive into the type of insights that everyone wants to know as they're building a business, and that I'm able to tap into as I'm building my own business with As Ever." Episodes of the podcast were made available on Spotify, YouTube, Apple Podcasts and other major audio platforms.

== Episodes ==
No.	Title	Run Time	Original release date
1	"The Evolution of the Entrepreneur with Bumble's Whitney Wolfe Herd"	49:52	April 8, 2025
2	"The Long Game with Girls Who Code's Reshma Saujani"	46:52	April 15, 2025
3	"Building Your Brand Brick by Brick with Highbrow Hippie's Kadi Lee"	51:31	April 22, 2025
4	"Attaining the Unattainable with IT Cosmetics' Jamie Kern Lima"	52:46	April 29, 2025
5	"Your One Big Break with Clevr Blends' Hannah Mendoza"	46:55	May 6, 2025
6	"Disrupting the Dress Code with FIGS' Heather Hasson"	46:38	May 13, 2025
7	"Bootstrapped and Booming with Kitsch's Cassandra Morales Thurswell"	46:06	May 20, 2025
8	"Business Is Not a Battlefield with SPANX's Sara Blakely"	53:38	May 27, 2025
9	"From Mama to Mogul with Cécred's Tina Knowles"	43:42	June 3, 2025

== Reception ==
=== Critical response ===
Writing for The Daily Telegraph, Chris Bennion gave the first episode of the podcast 2/5 describing it as "an inane stream of mindless aphorisms" and went on to say "there are no confessions or secrets – at one mystifying point Meghan says to her guest, 'You don't have to reveal all the secrets' – but there are plenty of self-care aphorisms, journeys of self-love and validation, discussions of bottling your essence, and great handfuls of mutual adoration." Rachel Aroesti of The Guardian also gave it 2/5 stating that "Meghan's sycophantic interview podcast is stomach-turning" and adding, "The Duchess of Sussex fawns over entrepreneur guests and delivers overwrought messages to listeners, while claiming her lifestyle brand is 'an extension of my essence'. It's a bit much". Charlie Gowans-Eglinton of The Times bemoaned the fact that the duchess did not ask "Bumble's Whitney Wolfe Herd how she made a billion" and that "I have been listening for 8 minutes and 48 seconds before Whitney speaks about business for — I timed it — 17 seconds before Meghan chimes in again." James Marriott of the same newspaper gave the podcast 1/5 arguing that "receiving business advice from a Californian multimillionaire who owes her fortune to marrying a prince is as illuminating as you would expect" and that at one point in the conversation he "was seized by an urge to beat my head against the wall and foundationally re-architect my skull."

Laura Slattery of The Irish Times commented on the first episode, stating "their treacly, ego-fluffing conversation – combined with Wolfe Herd's reminder that royal gossip does a decent trade here too – only serves to underline how the culture gap between Ireland and the US remains as wide as the Atlantic. It seems unlikely to be closed by a multimillionaire and a duchess who want credit for daring to love themselves". Tom Livingstone for Nine News called it "a bit ridiculous" and that the "whole podcast itself is a sort of love-in with both women telling each other how great they are." The i Paper's Sarah Carson questioned whether Meghan herself was actually "serious about the world of business pod-casting", complaining that the show "offers little of substance" and that "more than three times" Meghan's guest Wolfe Herd "tells a story about how wonderful Markle is, and at one stage marvels at her ability to 'exist'." Worrying that Marie Claire readers "still needed convincing" to listen to the podcast, Kate Hassett argued that there was "nothing nauseating about it", telling them "don't believe the boring headlines" and adding defiantly that "Meghan Markle's podcast works". The Independent's Katie Rosseinsky was concerned that although Meghan's "way of speaking is supposed to be vulnerable and open – it only ends up alienating the average listener", and criticized the podcast's "nearly incomprehensible" and "garbled verbal mush" which only does her listeners "a disservice".

The Australian's Kristen Amiet said though she doesn't "have strong feelings about Meghan Markle", listening to the series "triggered feelings of disbelief, exasperation, and a longing for it to be over". The journalist concluded that podcast listeners are "sophisticated, intelligent and engaged", and that delivering "hours of asinine chitchat" to serve a celebrity's ego showed clear contempt for them.

Despite a strong debut in the podcast charts, by Episode 3 it "appears to have fallen flat after slipping out of the Spotify 100 list both in the US and the UK" and "also failed to make it to Apple's Top 200 chart" according to the Evening Standard.

=== Awards ===
Year	Award	Category	Nominee	Result	Ref.
2025	4th Annual Signal Awards	Business People & Entrepreneurs Shaping Culture	Confessions of a Female Founder	Gold (Listener's Choice)	
