= Geoff Blackwell =

New Zealand publisher

Blackwell in 2015

Geoff Blackwell is a New Zealand publisher, author, and film director. He is the founder of publishing companies PQ Blackwell, Blackwell & Ruth (with co-founder Ruth Hobday), and MILK Books. He worked with Nelson Mandela and later the Nelson Mandela Foundation to produce several books, including Conversations with Myself, and is the creator and director of the Netflix original series Live to Lead (2022), in partnership with the foundation. In 2018, he created the 200 Women: Who Will Change the Way You See the World initiative, comprising a book and exhibition.

== Career ==
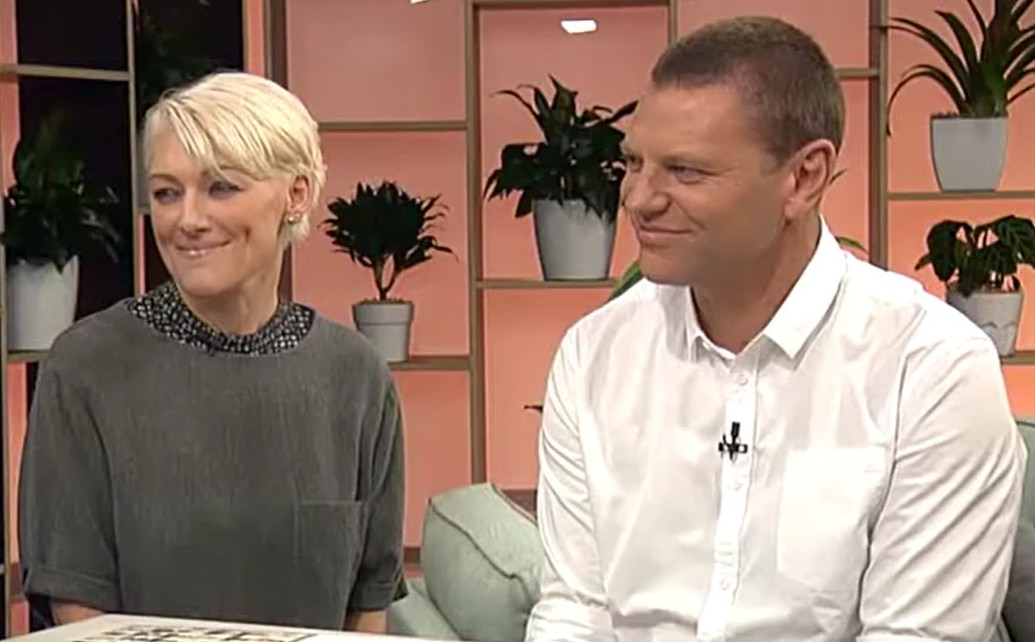
Left to right: Ruth Hobday and Geoff Blackwell in 2017

Geoff Blackwell has created books, exhibitions, and films on subjects of humanity, equality, and the environment. He has created books with international photographers Tim Flach, Platon, Albert Watson, Elliott Erwitt, Andrew Zuckerman, and others.

In 1998 he created M.I.L.K: Moments of Intimacy, Laughter and Kinship, an international photographic competition which received 40,000 entries from 164 countries.

In 2003 he established an independent publishing house, PQ Blackwell.

Over a number of years, Blackwell worked alongside Nelson Mandela and later the Nelson Mandela Foundation, with whom he created five books, including New York Times bestseller Conversations with Myself and The Prison Letters of Nelson Mandela (2017).

In 2011 he published Tutu: The Authorized Portrait with Archbishop Desmond Tutu and two books on the struggle for freedom in South Africa with anti-apartheid activist Ahmed Kathrada.

In 2012 he founded print-on-demand photo book business, MILK Books.

In 2017 he co-founded Blackwell and Ruth in partnership with Ruth Hobday, his long-time creative partner.

200 Women: Who Will Change the Way You See the World is a book and exhibition gender equality initiative launched in 2018. Co-authored with Ruth Hobday, it combines original interviews with photographic portraits by Kieran E. Scott, and was the result of a global journey to find two hundred women from diverse backgrounds, and to ask them what really matters to them.

In 2020 Blackwell and co-author Ruth Hobday published Human Nature: Planet Earth In Our Time. The book examines the age of the Anthropocene and the effect of humanity's intersection with nature, asking photographers Joel Sartore, Paul Nicklen, Ami Vitale, Brent Stirton, Frans Lanting, Brian Skerry, Tim Laman, Cristina Mittermeier, J Henry Fair, Richard John Seymour, George Steinmetz, and Steve Winter about their view on the present geological era for the planet.

In 2020 Blackwell published I Know This to Be True, a series of books featuring original interviews with modern leaders, including Jacinda Ardern, Bryan Stevenson, Stephen Curry, Greta Thunberg and Ruth Bader Ginsburg. Inspired by Nelson Mandela and produced in collaboration with the Nelson Mandela Foundation, the project shares the ideas, work and values of modern leaders. I Know This to Be True is the basis for the Netflix documentary series Live to Lead, also created and directed by Blackwell.

=== Film and other media ===
In 2022 Netflix released the original series Live to Lead, directed by Blackwell and produced by Ruth Hobday. The series was created in partnership with the Nelson Mandela Foundation and executive-produced by the Duke and Duchess of Sussex, Harry and Meghan.

Blackwell has created multi-platform projects including Wisdom, a book, film and exhibition with photographer Andrew Zuckerman featuring portraits and interviews with fifty famous 65-year-olds; and 200 Women: Who Will Change the Way You See the World, a book and exhibition project with co-author Ruth Hobday and photographs by Kieran E. Scott.

== Exhibitions ==
- M.I.L.K.: Moments of Intimacy, Laughter and Kinship, at New York's Grand Central Terminal, the Sydney Opera House and Science Museum, London
- Wisdom, by Andrew Zuckerman, at the State Library of New South Wales in Sydney, Australia; New York City; Los Angeles, Dublin, and Toronto
- 200 Women: Who Will Change the Way You See the World exhibition in New York City, Sydney, Munich, and Sweden

== Filmography ==
- Wisdom (2008) – Executive Producer
- Music (2010) – Executive Producer
- Live to Lead (2022) – Director, Executive Producer
