= One pot pasta =

Pasta cooking technique

One pot pasta is a pasta cooking technique popularized by Martha Stewart in 2013. In 2025 Food & Wine called it out as one of 25 recipes that changed how America cooks.

== Technique ==
The dish involves cooking all ingredients in a pot of boiling water that just covers the pasta rather than the more-typical technique of boiling the pasta in a large amount of water and making a sauce in a separate pan. The small amount of cooking water means the pasta creates its own sauce.

== Development and popularity ==
Stewart's technique was learned by Nora Singley, one of Stewart's recipe developers, from an Italian cook in Apulia in 2011 and was published in Martha Stewart Living in 2013. The recipe went viral. In 2025 Food & Wine included it on their list of The 25 Recipes That Changed How America Cooks.

In 2025 Meghan Markle used the technique to make a dish she called skillet spaghetti on an episode of her show With Love, Meghan; the technique again went viral. Markle was criticized for not crediting Stewart.
