= Claire Smith =

Claire Smith may refer to:

- Claire Smith (archaeologist) (born 1957), Australian archaeologist
- Claire Smith (journalist) (born 1954), American sportswriter
- Claire Smith (equestrian) (born 1963), Canadian equestrian
- Claire Bidwell Smith (born 1978), American therapist and author
- Claire Elizabeth Smith (born 1970), British television host, model and beauty pageant titleholder
