= Conversations with Myself =

Conversations With Myself may refer to:

- Conversations with Myself (album), a 1963 jazz album by Bill Evans
- Conversations With Myself (book), a 2010 book by Nelson Mandela
- "Conversations with Myself", a 2019 song by Bazzi from Soul Searching
