= Wiser Than Me =

Podcast hosted by Julia Louis-Dreyfus

Wiser Than Me is a podcast hosted by actress Julia Louis-Dreyfus. On the show, launched in 2023, Louis-Dreyfus interviews women older than her on their lived experience and earned wisdom. The show was named Apple's Best Podcast of the Year for 2023 and the Webby Podcast of the Year in 2024. Wiser Than Me is produced by Lemonada Media, a podcast company cofounded by Jessica Cordova Kramer and Stephanie Wittels Wachs.

Louis-Dreyfus created the show to counter-balance the trend of iconic women disappearing from the public eye as they age. In the first episode she explains that this struck her while watching a documentary about Jane Fonda. “It is just stunning to me that old women are so easily dismissed and made invisible by our culture,” she says. Jane Fonda later became the first guest on the show.

Each episode begins with a monologue from Louis-Dreyfus, followed by an interview with a well-known woman, typically over 70 years old, and ends with a recap conversation between Julia Louis-Dreyfus and her mom. Guests have included actress Jane Fonda, comedian Carol Burnett, author Isabel Allende and author Amy Tan.

== Episodes ==
Season 1
Ep #	Guest	Air Date
1	Actress / Activist Jane Fonda	April 11, 2023
2	Novelist Isabel Allende	April 11, 2023
3	Writer Fran Lebowitz	April 18, 2023
4	Chef Ruth Reichl	April 25, 2023
5	Singer Darlene Love	May 2, 2023
6	Fashion Designer Diane Van Furstenberg	May 9, 2023
7	Former Head of EPA Gina McCarthy	May 16, 2023
8	Novelist Amy Tan	May 23, 2023
9	Actress Rhea Perlman	May 30, 2023
10	Comedian Carol Burnett	June 6, 2023

Season 2
Ep #	Guest	Air Date
1	Actress / Activist Sally Field	March 28, 2024
2	Musician Bonnie Raitt	April 3, 2024
3	Model / Actress Beverly Johnson	April 10, 2024
4	Cook / Author Ina Garten	April 17, 2024
5	Tennis Player Billie Jean King	April 24, 2024
6	Musician Patti Smith	May 1, 2024
7	Choreographer / Actress Debbie Allen	May 8, 2024
8	Author Anne Lamott	May 15, 2024
9	Designer Vera Wang	May 22, 2024
10	Author / Activist Gloria Steinem	May 29, 2024
11	Singer / Actress Julie Andrews	June 5, 2024

Season 3
Ep #	Guest	Air Date
1	Scientist / Conservationist Jane Goodall	October 9, 2024
2	Chef / Author Alice Waters	October 16, 2024
3	Correspondent Nina Totenberg	October 23, 2024
4	Actress Catherine O'Hara	October 30, 2024
5	Activist Dolores Huerta	November 13, 2024
6	Actress / Model Isabella Rossellini	November 20, 2024
7	Singer / Actress Patti LaBelle	December 4, 2024
8	Actress / Dancer / Singer Rita Moreno	December 11, 2024
9	House Speaker Emerita Nancy Pelosi	December 18, 2024

Season 4
Ep #	Guest	Air Date
1	Actress / Comedian Jane Curtin	November 12, 2025
2	Cartoonist Roz Chast	November 19, 2025
3	Photographer Annie Leibovitz	December 3, 2025
4	Actress Glenn Close	December 10, 2025
5	Sister Helen Prejean	January 7, 2026
6	Swimmer Diana Nyad	January 14, 2026
7	Musician Cyndi Lauper	March 25, 2026
8	Actress Jean Smart	May 6, 2026
9	Actress Pam Grier	May 13, 2026
10	Governor Janet Mills	May 20, 2026
11	Singer-Songwriter / Activist Joan Baez	May 27, 2026

== Awards ==
Wiser Than Me was the single show named Apple's Best Podcast of the Year for 2023.

In 2024, Wiser Than Me was named the Webby Podcast of the Year. The show also won the 2024 Ambie Award for Best Interview Podcast.
