= Polo (TV series) =

2024 documentary series

- Promotional poster
- Genre: Documentary series
- Starring: Nacho Figueras; Adolfo Cambiaso; Poroto Cambiaso; Louis Devaleix; Timmy Dutta; Keko Magrini
- Music by: Sacha Chaban
- Country of origin: United States
- Original language: English
- No. of episodes: 5

Production
- Executive producers: Prince Harry, Duke of Sussex; Meghan, Duchess of Sussex; Andrew Fried; Chanel Pysnik; Miloš Balać; Ian Samplin; Natalie Doerr Weresow; Dane Lillegard; Sarina Roma
- Producers: Qadriyyah Shamsid-Deen; Jonathan "Monty" Mantovani; Léo Hamelin
- Editors: Matthew Greenberg; Uma Sanasaryan; Michael Brown; Gustaw Laskowicz; Meg Ramsay; Ben Eisele
- Production companies: Archewell Productions; Boardwalk Pictures

Original release
- Network: Netflix
- Release: December 10, 2024

Polo is a 2024 American documentary series set for streaming on Netflix. It was released on December 10, 2024.

== Background and production ==
In April 2024, it was reported that the Archewell Productions was in the process of developing two non-fiction projects and that one would focus on polo as a professional sport showcasing the U.S. Open Polo Championship. Netflix released the first trailer for the five-part docuseries on November 21, 2024. Among the athletes featured in the show are Argentine polo players Nacho Figueras and Adolfo Cambiaso.

== Episodes ==
No.	Title	Original release date
1	"Pressure"	December 10, 2024
2	"Focus"	December 10, 2024
3	"Priorities"	December 10, 2024
4	"Danger"	December 10, 2024
5	"Final"	December 10, 2024

== Reception ==
The series has a score of 40 on Metacritic. In his review for The Guardian, Stuart Heritage gave the series 2 out of 5 stars and wrote, "Polo looks destined to fall through the submenus into obscurity at the speed of light. And rightly so. It's clattering and niche, and feels like a spoof documentary designed to play on screens in the background of episodes of Succession." Writing for The Telegraph, Ed Power also gave the series 2 out of 5 stars and stated, "There's lots of blood, sweat, and tears in the series – but not enough of the Sussexes to make this anything other than a dull indulgence about a rich person's pursuit." Giving a similar rating to the series in his review for The Times, James Jackson argued "it's simply impossible to relate in the same way to the sleek, tanned, sports car-driving players of Polo, despite the lurking theme of demanding fathers. Still, if you were, say, Prince Harry, it would no doubt be the most compelling thing on TV."

The show garnered 500,000 views in the first half of 2025.
