= Elyse Myers =

Social media influencer

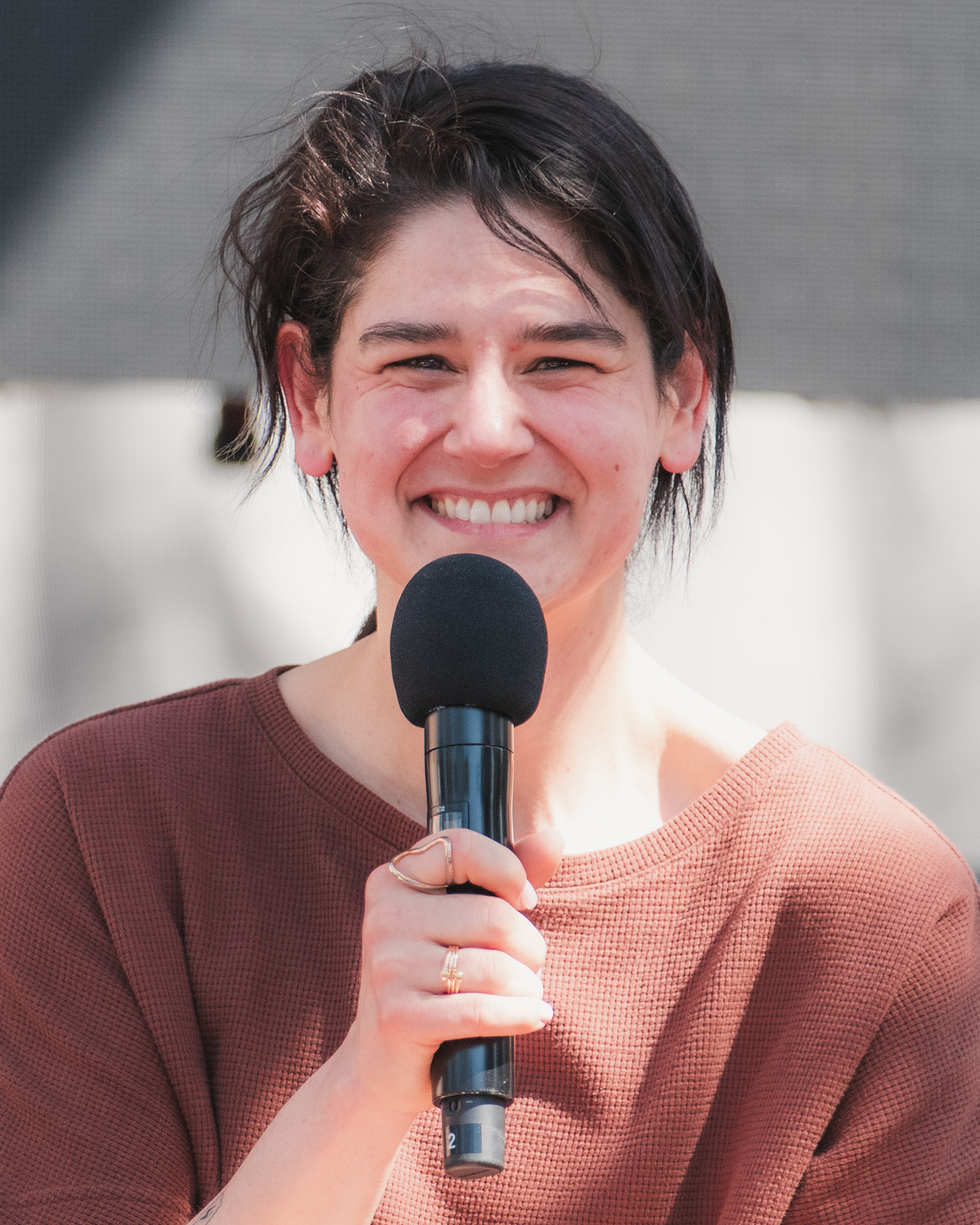
- Myers in 2026
- Born: California, United States
- Occupations: Social media influencer; comedian; author
- Children: 2 sons

TikTok information
- Page: Elyse Myers
- Followers: 7.1 Million
- Last updated: June 4, 2025
- Website: elysemyers.com

Elyse Myers is an American social media influencer, comedian, author, and musician from Nebraska. She gained notoriety on TikTok with an account of her worst date during which she purchased 100 tacos.

== Early life ==
Myers was raised in California. She played viola in high school.

== Career ==
Myers's October 2021 video recounting of her worst date went viral on TikTok. In it, a man tricks her into buying 100 tacos, and "Let's Feast" became a memorable phrase from the experience. The video took off almost immediately, and the sudden fame startled her. Her subsequent videos on TikTok and Instagram focused on sharing funny moments from her everyday life.

In October 2022, Myers launched the podcast Funny Cuz It's True with Lemonada Media and Powderkeg Media.

=== Philosophical views ===
Myers seeks to "promote mental well-being and compassion". She is candid in her videos, and promotes body positivity. She supports the Humane Society and organizations for foster children.

== Personal life ==
Myers is self-described as introverted and has been diagnosed as autistic, along with having ADHD and anxiety.

Myers lived in Sydney, Australia from 2014 to 2016. She moved to Nebraska with her husband in 2017. The two live in the Omaha area with their two sons. Myers experienced postpartum depression after the birth of her first child.

== Publications ==
- That's a Great Question, I'd Love to Tell You. HarperCollins. October 28, 2025. ISBN 978-0-06-338130-8.
