= Live to Lead =

2022 American documentary series

- Promotional poster
- Genre: Documentary series
- Directed by: Geoff Blackwell
- Presented by: Prince Harry, Duke of Sussex; Meghan, Duchess of Sussex
- Starring: Ruth Bader Ginsburg; Greta Thunberg; Bryan Stevenson; Jacinda Ardern; Siya Kolisi; Gloria Steinem; Albie Sachs
- Music by: Mike Fiore
- Country of origin: United States
- Original language: English
- No. of episodes: 7

Production
- Executive producers: Prince Harry, Duke of Sussex; Meghan, Duchess of Sussex; Ben Browning; Chanel Pysnik; Geoff Blackwell; Ruth Hobday; John Sloss
- Producer: Ruth Hobday
- Editors: Elizabeth Blackwell; James Brown
- Running time: 27–30 min
- Production companies: Blackwell & Ruth; Nelson Mandela Foundation; Archewell Productions; Cinetic Media

Original release
- Network: Netflix
- Release: December 31, 2022

Live to Lead is a 2022 American documentary series that streamed on Netflix. It was released on December 31, 2022.

== Background and production ==
The series featured interviews with world leaders and influencers, including Ruth Bader Ginsburg, Greta Thunberg, Bryan Stevenson, Jacinda Ardern, Siya Kolisi, Gloria Steinem, and Albie Sachs. Geoff Blackwell served as the series' director. The idea behind the series was conceived by Blackwell and Ruth Hobday as they worked on a project about Nelson Mandela in 2018. Titled I Know This to Be True, the project is a collaboration between Nelson Mandela Foundation and Blackwell & Ruth and involves a series of interviews with leaders and public figures that were released in 2020 as a series of books. In a statement, Blackwell said that the series aimed "to honor Mandela's values by surfacing the stories of leaders who distinguish themselves through their moral courage, the conviction of their ideals and values, and their prioritization of others."

After the first trailer for the documentary was released, New Zealand prime minister Jacinda Ardern stated that she was not in direct contact with the Duke and Duchess of Sussex about the project, and the footage they were using had come from a November 2019 interview with the Nelson Mandela Foundation that was originally meant to be used for "printed and digital books, short films and audiobooks." In March 2021, Ardern was notified that the foundation would use the footage for a Netflix project and in May 2022 she was told that the Duke and Duchess of Sussex would be presenting it, though all communications were through the foundation and Ardern was not in direct contact with the couple regarding the project.

== Episodes ==
No.	Title	Directed by	Original release date
1	Ruth Bader Ginsburg	Geoff Blackwell	December 31, 2022
2	Greta Thunberg	Geoff Blackwell	December 31, 2022
3	Bryan Stevenson	Geoff Blackwell	December 31, 2022
4	Jacinda Ardern	Geoff Blackwell	December 31, 2022
5	Siya Kolisi	Geoff Blackwell	December 31, 2022
6	Gloria Steinem	Geoff Blackwell	December 31, 2022
7	Albie Sachs	Geoff Blackwell	December 31, 2022
