= Archetypes (podcast) =

Society and culture podcast

- Genre: Culture; society; interview
- Language: English

Cast and voices
- Hosted by: Meghan, Duchess of Sussex

Music
- Opening theme: "I Am Woman"

Production
- Production: Archewell Audio; Gimlet Media; Spotify
- Length: 46–82 min

Publication
- No. of episodes: 12
- Original release: August 23 – November 29, 2022
- Provider: Spotify; Lemonada

Related
- Website: spotify.com

Archetypes is a podcast produced by Archewell Audio Productions and hosted by Meghan, Duchess of Sussex. The podcast debuted on Spotify on August 23, 2022, and featured Meghan talking with artists, athletes, and experts about the history of stereotypes that get leveled against women. In June 2023, Spotify and Archewell Audio released a statement that confirmed they mutually agreed to part ways. In February 2024 it was announced that Lemonada Media would redistribute the first season of Archetypes on all audio platforms.

== Production ==
In December 2020, it was reported that Prince Harry, Duke of Sussex and Meghan, Duchess of Sussex had signed a multi-year business deal by Dawn Ostroff, with Spotify to launch a podcast through their audio-producing company, Archewell Audio, a subsidiary of Archewell Inc. In January 2022, it was reported that Spotify had started efforts for expanding the couple's podcast team through "advertising for in-house staff" and hiring producers that would work with Archewell Audio via Gimlet Media. In March 2022, Archewell stated that they were "encouraged by ongoing conversations we’ve had with Spotify" on tackling misinformation, and that Meghan's first podcast series would be launched in the summer of 2022.

The podcast, titled Archetypes, includes a series of interviews with historians and experts to discuss the history of stereotypes that get leveled against women. Its stated aim was to “investigate, dissect and subvert the labels that try to hold women back." In April 2022, it was reported that Meghan had filed an application to trademark the word "archetypes", which would prevent anyone else from using the word for "podcasts, audio programs and audio books". In June 2023, the United States Patent and Trademark Office rejected a trademark application for the name 'Archetypes', with Meghan's lawyers announcing their intention to work on a new application. The application to trademark the podcast's name was withdrawn in September 2023.

Archetypes ran for one season of 12 episodes on Spotify. In June 2023, Spotify and Archewell released an official joint statement that said they were "proud of the series we made together” but that they "mutually agreed to part ways." After the split, Spotify executive Bill Simmons called Meghan and Prince Harry "grifters" on his own podcast, while Meghan's spokesperson stated that Meghan was "continuing to develop more content for the Archetypes audience on another platform." In February 2024 it was announced that Lemonada Media would redistribute the first season of Archetypes on all audio platforms.

== Episodes ==
| No. | Title | Run Time | Original release date |
|---|---|---|---|
| 1 | "The Misconception of Ambition with Serena Williams" | 57:28 | August 23, 2022 |
| 2 | "The Duality of Diva with Mariah Carey" | 46:04 | August 30, 2022 |
| 3 | "The Stigma of the Singleton with Mindy Kaling" | 48:50 | September 6, 2022 |
| 4 | "The Demystification of Dragon Lady with Margaret Cho & Lisa Ling" | 46:23 | October 4, 2022 |
| 5 | "The Decoding of Crazy with Deepika Padukone, Jenny Slate and Constance Wu" | 55:11 | October 11, 2022 |
| 6 | "Breaking down 'The Bimbo' with Paris Hilton & Iliza Shlesinger" | 52:48 | October 18, 2022 |
| 7 | "Upending the 'Angry Black Woman' Myth with Issa Rae & Ziwe" | 47:45 | October 25, 2022 |
| 8 | "Good Wife/Bad Wife, Good Mom/Bad Mom with Sophie Grégoire Trudeau, Pamela Adlon and Sam Jay" | 55:34 | November 1, 2022 |
| 9 | "To 'B' or not to 'B'? with Mellody Hobson & Victoria Jackson" | 1:00:00 | November 8, 2022 |
| 10 | "The Audacity of the Activist with Jameela Jamil & Shohreh Aghdashloo" | 1:04:00 | November 15, 2022 |
| 11 | "'Beyond the Archetype: Human, Being' with Michaela Jaé Rodriguez & Candace Bushnell" | 58:15 | November 22, 2022 |
| 12 | "'Man-ifesting A Cultural Shift' with Trevor Noah, Andy Cohen and Judd Apatow" | 1:22:00 | November 29, 2022 |

== Reception ==
=== Ratings ===
Within a few days of its premiere, Archetypes became Spotify's most-listened-to podcast in the United Kingdom, Australia, Canada, Ireland, New Zealand, and the United States. Spotify reported that, in its 3rd quarter in 2022, their listeners grew by "substantial double digits," specifically noting that Archetypes "reached No. 1 in the podcast charts in more than six countries." On November 17, 2022, Archetypes continued to chart at No. 4 among "society and culture" podcasts in the United States. A week after the podcast concluded, Archetypes remained in the top 10 of Spotify's "top podcast" chart for the US, and the top 15 for the UK.

=== Critical response ===
The podcast's content received mixed reviews from critics. Reviewing the podcast for The Guardian, Miranda Sawyer wrote that, though Meghan "has a lovely voice, is intelligent and is clear and light when reading a script," Meghan "needs more" than this to produce an engaging podcast. Writing for Salon, Melanie McFarland stated that the podcast felt like spending time with a host who is "friendly and down to Earth." In her review for The Independent, Olivia Petter stated that Meghan's understanding of feminism "seems to be almost entirely about herself." In a review for The New Statesman, Rachel Cunliffe noted the controversial media context of the podcast, stating, "The Meghan-just-cares-about-Meghan crowd no doubt think she has played straight into their hands. And yet I suspect if you come to Archetypes from a pro-Meghan standpoint, you'll find it uplifting – even insightful."

=== Awards ===
In 2022, Archetypes won The People's Choice Award for "The Pop Podcast of 2022." When receiving this award, Meghan described Archetypes as "a labor of love." In 2023, Meghan was also named "a digital media national winner" by the 48th Annual Gracie Awards. After receiving this award, Meghan stated, "This is a shared success for me and the team behind Archetypes — most of whom are women — and the inspiring guests who joined me each week."

| Year | Award | Category | Nominee | Result | Ref. |
|---|---|---|---|---|---|
| 2022 | 48th People's Choice Awards | The Pop Podcast of 2022 | Archetypes | Won | |
| 2023 | 48th Annual Gracie Awards | Entertainment Podcast Host | Meghan, Duchess of Sussex | Won | |

=== Controversy ===
In the first episode, Meghan revealed that, while visiting South Africa, there was a fire in the room where her infant son was staying while she and her husband were not there. As she described this event, Meghan referred to the place where her family was staying at the British High Commissioner's residence in South Africa as a "housing unit." Her use of the term, "housing unit," was criticized in social media.

In the sixth episode, Meghan discussed her time working as a Deal or No Deal briefcase model. She stated that, though she was "surrounded by smart women on that stage," the models were treated like stereotypical "bimbos." She claimed there had been different beauty stations for the models to prepare for the game show, including a section where you could add "padding in your bra." Former Deal or No Deal model Patricia Kara disputed this latter claim, stating "There is no truth to the padding station. In all the years I worked on the show, that never existed." Howie Mandel, the Deal or No Deal host during Meghan's time working there, stated that he didn't think that Meghan was complaining in her comments, but "I think Meghan just said she wanted to do more. It wasn't fulfilling for her."

Following the 2023 announcement that Spotify and Archewell parted ways, Bill Simmons, head of podcast innovation and monetization at Spotify, criticized Meghan and Prince Harry on his podcast. Meghan and Prince Harry did not comment.

Following allegations that Meghan had not conducted the interviews for her podcast, an Archetypes producer confirmed that Meghan conducted the main interviews while producers "occasionally" conducted the other interviews, adding that they "never edited [Meghan] asking questions into interviews that producers conducted."
