= Harris Wittels =

American actor, comedian, writer, and musician (1984–2015)

- Wittels in Piazza San Marco, Venice, Italy
- Born: Harris Lee Wittels; April 20, 1984; Oklahoma City, Oklahoma, U.S.
- Died: February 19, 2015 (aged 30); Los Angeles, California, U.S.
- Relatives: Stephanie Wittels (sister)

Comedy career
- Years active: 2007–2015
- Medium: Stand-up, television, film, music

Harris Lee Wittels (April 20, 1984 – February 19, 2015) was an American comedian. He was a writer for The Sarah Silverman Program, a writer and executive producer for Parks and Recreation, and a recurring guest on Comedy Bang! Bang! He coined the word humblebrag in 2010.

== Early life ==
Wittels was born in Oklahoma City, Oklahoma, US, the son of Ellison Wittels and Maureen (née Davidson) Wittels. He was raised in Houston, Texas, in the Jewish faith. He celebrated his bar mitzvah at Temple Emanu-El.

His elder sister is writer and anime voice-over actress Stephanie Wittels. He described his father as "the funniest dude alive".

Wittels attended the High School for the Performing and Visual Arts in Houston. In 2006, he graduated from Emerson College, where he was a member of Sigma Alpha Epsilon, with a degree in television and video production.

== Career ==
After performing stand-up comedy in Los Angeles, Wittels met Sarah Silverman and became a writer on The Sarah Silverman Program in 2007. He also wrote for the 2007 and 2008 MTV Movie Awards. When The Sarah Silverman Program ended in 2010, Wittels became a staff writer and executive story editor for Parks and Recreation during the show's second season, then later co-producer during the third season and executive producer during the fourth. His writing credits included the episodes "Media Blitz", "94 Meetings" and "Dave Returns". He also appeared on the show as Harris, a dim-witted animal control employee. He wrote for Secret Girlfriend and Eastbound and Down.

In 2012, Wittels was cast as a co-star in Sarah Silverman's NBC pilot Susan 313 along with June Diane Raphael and Tig Notaro, which was not picked up. In 2012, Wittels was hired as a consulting producer for the TV series Eastbound & Down during its third season. He consulted throughout the season, as well as co-writing two episodes.

Wittels was a frequent guest on the Earwolf podcast Comedy Bang! Bang! and was known for the recurring segment "Harris' Foam Corner" (originally titled "Harris' Phone Corner", which debuted on Episode 31 of CBB), during which he read jokes and observations saved on his phone that were deemed to be not good enough for his act. The jokes were typically lambasted by host Scott Aukerman. Also on the Earwolf network, Wittels hosted the Analyze Phish podcast, where he attempted to convince friends to enjoy the band Phish. He was also part of the popular series of CBB episodes titled "Farts and Procreation" along with fellow Parks and Recreation alumni Adam Scott and Chelsea Peretti. The episodes would usually devolve into nonsensical improv sessions. There were four "Farts and Pro" episodes, the final one being recorded very shortly before Harris' death and released days later, posthumously.

Wittels was a member of the band Don't Stop or We'll Die, along with comedians Paul Rust and Michael Cassady. He was the band's drummer and provided backing vocals. DSOWD performed a number of times on Comedy Bang! Bang! and played Los Angeles venues such as Largo and writer/director Rob Schrab's wedding. Notable songs include "Lisa," "Once in Awhile," and "She Got Titties (In All The Right Places)".

In 2010, Wittels coined the word "humblebrag" on Twitter. He wrote for Grantland on the subject of notable "humblebrags", the act of boasting about one's life and then downplaying it. The popularity of the feed led to a book, Humblebrag: The Art of False Modesty, published in 2012. Humblebrag was designated the "most useful" word of 2011 by the American Dialect Society.

In August 2013, NBC picked up an untitled Wittels sitcom, about a slacker still living with his parents while dealing with his whiz kid younger brother, a multi-millionaire entrepreneur in high school.

== Personal life ==
Wittels was a dedicated fan of the band Phish. His mother Maureen estimated that he saw the band in concert over 300 times in his lifetime, and his contract for The Sarah Silverman Program was reportedly written to include time off so he could follow the band on tour. According to the first episode of Analyze Phish, Wittels became a fan of Phish while he was in high school, after he and his friends spontaneously decided to see the band's concert on September 25, 1999, at the Cynthia Woods Mitchell Pavilion in The Woodlands, Texas. Wittels described the show's impact on him in an interview with Relix, recalling "I was literally a fan since that night. It was the most amazing concert experience of my life. It wasn't even that great of a show, but even a regular Phish show, especially pre-hiatus, is gonna be better than anything else you see." Wittels often appeared on Parks and Recreation as the character Harris, who habitually wore Phish t-shirts. The Analyze Phish podcast inspired Phish's lyricist Tom Marshall to start his own podcast about the band, Under the Scales, in 2016.

In an interview on the podcast You Made It Weird dated November 19, 2014, Wittels openly discussed his personal life and history of drug addiction with host Pete Holmes. He said he had done drugs recreationally since he was 12. He said his drug usage got "out of hand" because of a breakup with a woman he felt was "perfect" for him in every way, except that she and her family were Scientologists, which he described as a "deal-breaker." He said he began to rely on oxycodone to deal with his stress over the relationship, his work on various television pilots, and writing the Humblebrag book. "It was easier just to take drugs and do it all. I wrote that entire book on so much drugs," Wittels said. "That's a humblebrag." He said he had gone to rehab for a second time after becoming addicted to heroin, and he had just gotten out a month earlier, saying: "Sobriety is still fresh. I haven't figured it all out."

Wittels addressed his struggles with addiction on Analyze Phish, citing his second stay in rehab as one of the reasons for the delays in releasing the episode where co-host Scott Aukerman went to Phish's 2013 live show at the Hollywood Bowl. During the episode, which was released nearly a year after the show, Wittels touched on the impact his addiction had on his personal and professional life, as well as the use of recreational drugs as part of his Phish fandom.

== Death ==
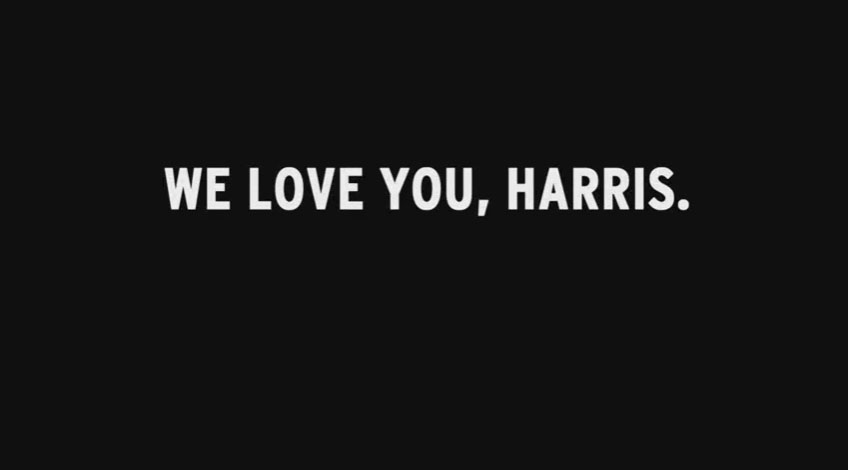
The final frame of the series finale of Parks and Recreation, which aired on February 24, 2015, featured a message to Wittels.

On February 19, 2015, Wittels was found dead in his Los Angeles home. It was later confirmed to be due to a heroin overdose. On February 18, during his stand-up set at The Meltdown, he had talked about living sober and said he was in "a good place".

Following news of his death, Wittels' friends and colleagues—including Aziz Ansari, Amy Poehler, Dan Harmon, Sarah Silverman, Doug Benson, and Scott Aukerman—paid tribute to him. Ansari wrote on his blog that the two had been planning to move to New York City together in March, and he shared his favorite memory of Wittels during an appearance on Conan.

The final episode of Parks and Recreation, "One Last Ride", aired on February 24, five days after Wittels' death. It included a final frame with the message "We love you, Harris."

Similarly, a frame, "Dedicated to the Memory of Harris Wittels", appears before the closing credits on the Aziz Ansari: Live at Madison Square Garden comedy special that was released March 6, 2015, on Netflix. In the first-season finale of Ansari and Alan Yang's show Master of None, on which Wittels was a writer, an intertitle states "This series is dedicated to the memory of our dear friend. Harris Wittels 1984–2015".

== Legacy ==
Harris' sister, Stephanie Wittels Wachs, used funds her brother left her in his will to set up a multi-discipline performance and communal space for creative people in Houston. Called the Rec Room, the 60-seat theater and adjoining bar opened in June 2016 near Minute Maid Park. On April 20, 2017, the first 420-themed "Harris Phest" was held, with comedy, Parks and Rec sketches, and a Phish cover band to mark what would have been his 33rd birthday. The Harris Phest benefits the Harris Wittels Scholarship Fund, which provides grants to students at his alma mater, Houston's High School for the Performing and Visual Arts.

== Publications ==
- Harris Wittels (2012). Humblebrag: The Art of False Modesty. New York: Grand Central Publishing. ISBN 978-1455514182.
