= Gregory D. Hague =

American lawyer and businessman

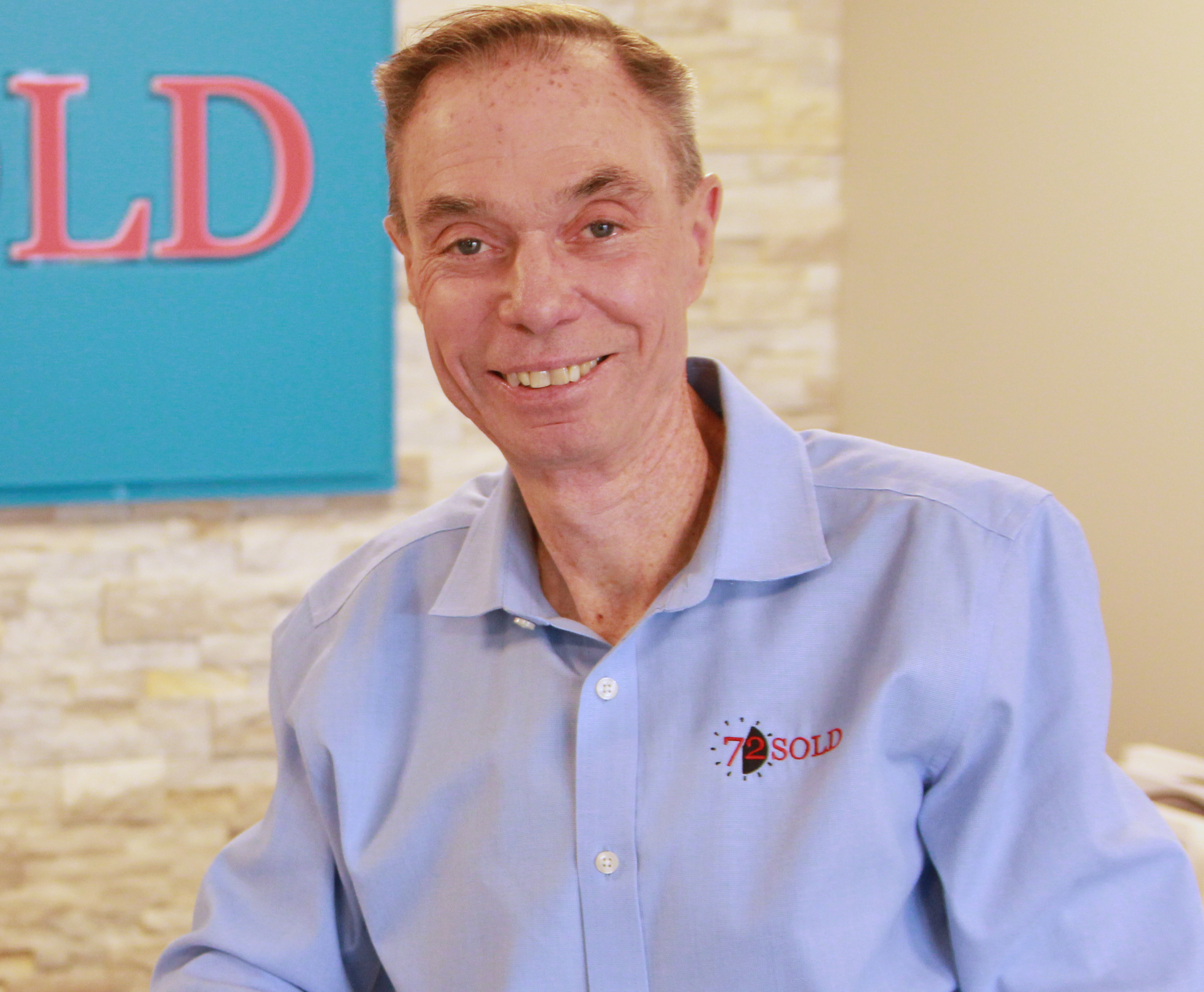
- Born: Gregory Dean Hague; September 30, 1948 (age 77)
- Education: Miami University (BS); American University Washington College of Law (JD)
- Occupation: Entrepreneur
- Known for: Hague Partners; 72Sold.com
- Children: 3

Gregory Dean Hague (born September 30, 1948) is an American businessman, lawyer, real-estate consultant, and entrepreneur based in Arizona.

== Education ==
Hague graduated from Miami University in 1971 with a Bachelor of Science degree, and his Juris Doctor (J.D.) degree from American University Washington College of Law, Washington D.C., in 1974. Hague received his first real estate license at age 18, and his first license to practice law in 1974 at age 26.

== Career ==
Hague went to work in the family’s real estate business, Hague Realtors, one of the largest brokerages in the Cincinnati area.

In 1978, Hague founded his first real estate firm, Heritage House Real Estate. Within a year of its founding, the firm was one of the largest brokerages in Cincinnati with 11 offices, 220 agents and more than 600 property listings. The firm went out of business in 1980 due to the market’s high interest rates and declining real estate sales.

Hague moved his family to Scottsdale, Arizona in 1981. In April 1988, he founded WHY USA, Inc. using what was considered a controversial business model. WHY USA worked with home owners to sell their houses for an advanced fee payment plan. Hague started WHY USA with three people. After a year of operations, the company was affiliated with 221 salespeople. The firm and its business model were featured in two best-selling books: Kiplinger’s Buying and Selling a Home and Carolyn Janik’s How to Sell Your Home in the 90s with Less Stress and More Profit. Hague franchised the business to more than 100 offices.

Hague served on the Publications Committee of the National Association of Realtors in 1990. In 1992, he sold WHY USA to his management team. In 1993, Hague founded Hague Partners, a real estate firm specializing in luxury properties.

In 2009, Hague enrolled in a bar review course at the Arizona School of Law, where he studied 14 hours a day seven days a week for five months for the Arizona bar exam. Hague received the highest score in the state of Arizona for the 2010 bar exam.

Hague was an adjunct professor of law at the Phoenix School of Law where he was named Professor of the Year in 2011. He was also a guest speaker at the State Bar of Arizona 2012 Convention, and has taught CLE accredited education programs for attorneys.

Hague initially practiced law with the firm Stinson Morrison Hecker, LLP in Phoenix, Arizona. In July 2013, he founded Hague Law Group, and has a 9.5 out of 10 Avvo rating. As part of his law practice, Hague volunteers with the Arizona Volunteer Lawyers Program.

In 2013, Hague founded Savvy Dad, a website and blog for dads. The site features personal stories, as well as contributed stories from others. The site has had more than 40,000 visitors. Hague's other venture is SmartsMatter, a self-help website.

Hague is the founder of the real estate company Hague Partners, and the real estate coaching company Real Estate Mavericks. He is also the former CEO of Harvey Mackay University.

Hague's real estate theories are based on the idea that the traditional practice of immediately listing a home with the MLS (Multiple Listing Service) may have a diminishing impact on home sales prices, calling DOM (days on market), information accessible on the MLS to buyers, "death to the price of a home". U.S. News & World Report characterized his strategies as "counterintuitive". Hague's 22 -step home selling formula was featured in Forbes.

Hague has provided real estate-related commentary to the Wall Street Journal.

He is the host of the Get Smart Real Estate Show airing every weekday morning in Phoenix on KTAR talk/sports radio.

In 2018, Hague developed 72SOLD.com, a program that allows users to sell homes in 72 hours.

In 2019, Hague initiated a political campaign to repeal a state law prohibiting Arizona communities from regulating short-term rentals. In 2021, Hague's real-estate firm, 72SOLD, partnered with the Arizona Cardinals.

In 2022, Hague's 72SOLD partnered with the Arizona Diamondbacks. That same year Hague’s company entered a strategic partnership with Keller Williams to enable its agents to use the 72SOLD program to market listings. In 2023, Hague paired his company with BoxBrownie to create CGI enhanced photographs of real estate for sale. In 2024, Hague launched Just 990, a new real estate firm that enables homeowners to sell with a full-service realtor for a flat fee. In 2025 Hague launched Homes2X, a company that purchases homes valued up to $3 million at a price based on an independent appraisal, then gives back any resale profit to the sellers, less a 1.5% fee. In September of 2025 Hague's company, 72SOLD, launched a program promising to buy a seller's home with a "full market value guarantee" if it's not sold at the owner's desired price in 30 days or fewer.

In 2026, Compass International Holdings named Hague as their director of home sale strategy.

== Authorship ==
Hague's work has been published in the Arizona State Bar's Real Estate Law Journal. He has published several articles for the Huffington Post.

In June 2013, he self-published the book, How Fathers Change Lives, which is a collection of 52 inspiring stories about remarkable dads and how they impacted the lives of their children. The book was featured in Investor's Business Daily.

== Recognition ==
The Volunteer Lawyers Program named Hague a Top Attorney of the Month in 2013. The Arizona Foundation for Legal Services and Education named him one of the Top 50 Pro Bono Attorneys of the Year in 2012. The State Bar Association presented Hague with the number one bar score award at its annual convention in 2010. In 2022 Hague's company won The Phoenix Business Journal's "Innovator of the Year" award. In 2024 Hague's 72SOLD was recognized by Inc 5000 as the fastest-growing real estate firm in its home state of Arizona, first in the western U.S., and second in the nation. That was the third year in a row Hague's firm ranked in the Top 500 of the Inc 5000.

In 2025 the company Hague founded and remains CEO for, 72SOLD, was recognized by Inc 5000 as the fastest growing privately held company in its home state of Arizona, and the fastest growing real estate firm in the Southwest U.S.
