= Stephanie Wittels Wachs =

American actress

- Born: Stephanie Rose Wittels; February 20, 1981 (age 45); Houston, Texas, U.S.
- Education: New York University; University of Houston
- Occupation: Voice actress
- Years active: 2004–present
- Spouse: Mike Wachs
- Children: 2
- Relatives: Harris Wittels (brother)

Stephanie Rose Wittels Wachs (born February 20, 1981) is an American voice actress, activist, and author. She is the co-founder and executive director of the theatre company Rec Room Arts in Houston, Texas and the co-founder and chief creative officer of the podcast network Lemonada Media. Wachs is the host of the podcast Last Day.

== Career ==
=== Memoir ===
Wachs is the author of Everything is Horrible and Wonderful: A Tragicomic Memoir of Genius, Heroin, Love and Loss, a memoir about addiction, grief, and healing. Her other writing can be found on Vox, Longform, Huffington Post, Fatherly, Babble, and Medium.

=== Lemonada Media ===
In 2017, Wachs appeared as a guest on the podcast Terrible, Thanks for Asking! discussing her struggle coping with her brother's death. At the time, Wachs was hosting a podcast of her own called Hands Off Parenting and continuing her work in voice acting. An Executive Producer of Crooked Media's Pod Save the People, Jessica Cordova Kramer, heard the episode and subsequently made contact with Wachs. Cordova Kramer had lost her brother, Stefano, to a battle with addiction earlier that year. In September 2019, the two teamed up to found the podcasting network Lemonada Media.

Lemonada Media's first launch was a narrative podcast breaking down the opioid crisis through personal interviews entitled Last Day. Last Day was an honoree in two categories at the 2020 Webby Awards and nominated for a 2020 iHeart Radio Award.

Wachs is chief content officer and executive producer for Lemonada Media's other slated podcasts, including Our America with Julian Castro, Tell Me What to Do with Jaime Primak Sullivan, and The Untold Story: Policing.

=== Press ===
Wachs has been a guest on Late Night with Seth Meyers, NPR Weekend Edition, Houston Matters, and numerous podcasts including Comedy Bang! Bang!, Who Charted?, and Alison Rosen Is Your New Best Friend. She has been featured in People magazine, Entertainment Weekly, Bustle, The Hollywood Reporter, Arts & Culture Magazine, and as one of Houstonia Magazine's "10 Houston Women Making it Happen."

== Personal life ==
Wachs is married to Mike Wachs. They have a daughter born in 2014 and a son born in 2018, named after her younger brother, Harris Wittels. In her book, she also mentioned that she has two nieces.

== Filmography ==
=== Film ===
Year	Title	Role	Notes
2004	Jing: King of Bandits: Seventh Heaven	Clove	Video Short
2005	Air: The Movie	Kano Kirishima	
2007	Clannad The Movie	Kouko Ibuki	
2011	Eternal Quon 3: The Complicity of Dreams	Tsutomu	

=== Television ===
Year	Title	Role	Notes
2005	Xenosaga: The Animation	Shion Uzuki	Episode: “Awakening”
2005	Air	Kano Kirishima, Additional Voices	Recurring role (10 episodes)
2006	SoltyRei	Sarah Revant	Episode: "Tears: After the Showdown"
2006	Magikano	Ran, Additional Voices	Guest role (3 episodes)
2006	Welcome to the N.H.K.	Misaki Nakahara	Episode: “Welcome to the Project!”
2006	Red Garden	Mirielle	Guest role (2 episodes)
2006	009-1	Victor, Additional Voices	Guest role (3 episodes)
2006	Air Gear	Yayoi Nakayama	Main role (20 episodes)
2006–2007	The Wallflower	Additional Voices	Guest role (9 episodes)
2007	Tokyo Majin	Aoi Masato	Episode: “First Night: The Twelve Generals of the Martial Fist”
2007	Venus Versus Virus	Lilith	Episode: "Deep Feelings"
2007	Ice	Hitomi Aida	Unknown
2007	Devil May Cry: The Animated Series	Nina	Guest role (2 episodes)
2007	Princess Resurrection	Mikasa	Episode: “Princess Zombie"
2007–2009	Clannad	Kouko Ibuki, Female Student	Guest role (14 episodes) (Includes After Story)
2007–2008	Princess Resurrection	Francesca	Main role (15 episodes)
2008	Xam'd: Lost Memories	Yunbo	Guest role (3 episodes)
2009	Needless	Kanna	Episode: “Seto x Soruva”
2010	The World God Only Knows	Additional Voices	Episode: “Flag.12.0 More Than a God, Less Than a Human"
2011	Chihayafuru	Additional Voices	Episode: "Now the Flower Blooms"
2015–2022	Food Wars!: Shokugeki no Soma	Erina Nakiri	Main role
2015–2016	Gate	Shino Kuribayashi	Recurring role (15 episodes)
2015	My Love Story!!	Mariya Saijo	Guest role (4 episodes)
2015	School-Live!	Megumi ‘Megu-nee’ Sakura	Main role (11 episodes)
2015	Chivalry of a Failed Knight	Toka Todo	Guest role (4 episodes)
2015–2016	Ushio and Tora	Hinowa, Kaori	Guest role (10 episodes)
2016	Flying Witch	Makoto Kowata	Main role (12 episodes)
2016	Tanaka-kun is Always Listless	Shiraishi	Recurring role (11 episodes)
2016	Onigiri	Yoshitsune	Main role (12 episodes)
2017	Just Because!	Momoka Suzuki	Guest role (3 episodes)
2017	Girls' Last Tour	Ishii	Episode: “Accident/Technology/Takeoff”
2018	Mitsuboshi Colors	Additional Voices	Guest role (12 episodes)
