= National Center for Charitable Statistics =

Clearing house for data about U.S. nonprofit organizations

- Abbreviation: NCCS
- Founded: 1982; 44 years ago
- Legal status: Program of the Urban Institute
- Website: nccs.urban.org

The National Center for Charitable Statistics (NCCS) is a clearing house for information about the U.S. economy as it relates to nonprofit organizations. The National Center for Charitable Statistics builds national, state, and regional databases and develops standards for reporting on the activities of all tax-exempt organizations.

== Services ==
The National Center for Charitable Statistics collects data on charities in the U.S. and shares this data with the public.

The National Center for Charitable Statistics maintains a free online directory of charities, listed by mission and location.

When the Electronic Data Initiative for Nonprofits Coalition was formed in 2002, the National Center for Charitable Statistics advised the group in furtherance of the goal of integrated federal and state electronic reporting and dissemination of data on nonprofit organizations.

GuideStar works with the National Center for Charitable Statistics to get each Form 990 filed by a nonprofit organization online and readily available to the public. The National Center for Charitable Statistics buys scans of each organization's annual Form 990 on CDs from the Internal Revenue Service, and the scans are then posted online in order to help donors decide to which organizations they wish to give their donations.

== History ==
The National Center for Charitable Statistics was established on March 15, 1982, as a research division of Independent Sector. Russy Sumariwalla was the first executive director of the National Center for Charitable Statistics. Prior to its establishment, no one knew exactly how many nonprofit organizations existed and how nonprofit organizations were using their donations, and enacting laws and policies related to nonprofit organization was very difficult.

The National Center for Charitable Statistics was transferred to the Center on Nonprofits and Philanthropy (CNP) at the Urban Institute on July 1, 1996.

The National Center for Charitable Statistics, along with several other nonprofit organizations, was instrumental in creating the National Taxonomy of Exempt Entities classification system or NTEE Codes. The National Taxonomy of Exempt Entities classifies organizations into more than 100 different categories based on the mission and program activities of an organization. The Internal Revenue Service uses this system to classify newly registered tax-exempt organizations.
