= National Taxonomy of Exempt Entities =

Classification for tax-exempt organizations in the United States

The National Taxonomy of Exempt Entities (NTEE) is a used by the Internal Revenue Service (IRS) and NCCS to classify U.S. tax-exempt organizations. A specialist from the IRS assigns an NTEE code to each organization exempt under I.R.C. § 501(a) as part of the process of closing a case when the organization is recognized as tax-exempt. For more information and more detailed definitions of these codes developed by the National Center for Charitable Statistics (NCCS), visit the Urban Institute. The NTEE classification system was developed by the National Center for Charitable Statistics. The IRS classifies nonprofit organizations using this system.
