= Figs (company) =

American clothing company

FIGS, Inc.
- Type: Public company
- Traded as: NYSE: FIGS (Class A); Russell 2000 component
- Industry: Medical apparel
- Founded: 2013; 13 years ago
- Founders: Heather Hasson; Trina Spear
- Headquarters: Santa Monica, California, U.S.
- Products: Scrubs
- Revenue: ▲US$631 million (2025)
- Net income: ▲US$34.2 million (2025)
- Number of employees: 264 (December 31, 2021)
- Website: wearfigs.com

Figs, Inc. (stock symbol FIGS) is an American clothing company based in Santa Monica, California, The company sells scrubs and other products for healthcare professionals. It was founded in 2013 by Heather Hasson and Trina Spear, who are co-CEOs.

== History ==
FIGS was founded by Heather Hasson and Trina Spear in Los Angeles, California in 2013. Hasson had the business idea when she realized that, unlike companies such as Lululemon, Under Armour, and Nike, which make clothes for athletes, no companies were making fitted uniforms for health care professionals. Spear worked on Wall Street at the time and helped Hasson develop the business idea.

Hasson and Spear started FIGS using only their personal savings. They designed an alternative to the common scrubs available. Initially, they sold their product out of the parking lots of hospitals, getting feedback from staff. In 2013, Hasson and Spear raised a $2 million seed round so that they would not run out of product. In 2014 and 2015, they raised an additional $3 million. In 2016, the Lululemon-backed venture capital fund, Campfire, led the Series A funding round, which raised $5 million.

In 2017, Thomas Tull, businessman and founder of Legendary Pictures, invested $65 million in the company and became majority owner of FIGS. Others who have invested include Will Smith, Irving Place Capital, former Lululemon CEO Christine Day, and Mohr Davidow Ventures.

The company headquarters are in Santa Monica, California. In December 2015, FIGS was selected to join the Endeavor network, a startup accelerator and mentorship program. As of 2018, the company had raised a total of $75 million in funding. FIGS was recognized as one of the fastest-growing companies in the United States by Inc. in 2018, with the company having a three-year growth of 9,948%.

In 2019, FIGS opened a pop-up shop in Los Angeles. It added face masks to its products during the coronavirus pandemic in 2020, and expanded sales to Australia and the United Kingdom. In 2020, revenue doubled to $263 million, and profits were almost $50 million.

In May 2021, FIGS filed for an initial public offering for $3 billion. On May 27, 2021, it became the first company led by two female cofounders to trade on the New York Stock Exchange. Also for the first time, FIGS allowed retail investors early access to purchase shares before the official sale began on the NYSE.

In November 2022, a California jury rejected all claims made by a competitor as "not valid" in a lawsuit alleging FIGS had "false advertising and misleading business practices." The lawsuit was concluded after almost 4 years of litigation.

By 2023, non-scrub products, including lab coats, activewear, loungewear, footwear, and compression socks, accounted for approximately 20% of the company's revenue.

== Operation ==
FIGS sells scrubs, other medical clothing, and associated products, including scrub tops, scrub pants, underscrubs, lab coats, activewear, and loungewear. The scrubs are made with a proprietary material that is antimicrobial for odor resistance, with four-way stretch and pockets.

All sales are online, via the company's website. FIGS predicted revenue of over $250 million in 2020, mostly through the sale of its upgraded scrubs. The company's warehouse is in City of Industry, California.

=== Charitable operations ===
FIGS also operates the Threads for Threads program, which donates sets of scrubs to countries with limited access to medical apparel. The program includes giving trips and results in the donations of scrubs around the world. By 2019 the initiative had donated over 500,000 sets of scrubs in over 35 countries.

In the COVID-19 pandemic in early 2020, FIGS donated 30,000 sets of scrubs to New York hospitals Bellevue and Mount Sinai, and sent 100 care packages to health care workers every week. It contracted the production of over one million N95 masks and also donated them to hospitals and medical professionals.

=== Marketing ===
In October 2020, FIGS released a promotional video featuring a female osteopathic physician in neon pink scrubs reading a book titled "Medical Terminology for Dummies" while holding it upside down. The camera then cut to a zoomed in view of a blank badge labeled with the letters "DO". The video was taken down after widespread criticism as sexist, particularly from female physicians and osteopathic physicians.

Hasson and Spear apologized for the video and said they planned to hire consultants to help with future videos to avoid repeating this mistake. FIGS later partnered with the American Osteopathic Association and pledged $100,000 to it.
