= Pantsuit Politics =

American political podcast

- Genre: Political podcast, news

Creative team
- Directed by: Alise Napp

Cast and voices
- Hosted by: Sarah Stewart Holland and Beth Silvers

Music
- Theme music composed by: Dante Lima

Production
- Production: Studio D Podcast Production

Publication
- Original release: November 2015
- Provider: Lemonada Media

Related
- Related shows: The Nuanced Life

Pantsuit Politics is an American political podcast distributed by Lemonada Media and launched in November 2015. It is hosted twice a week, and features a bipartisan discussion format, and is hosted by Sarah Stewart Holland and Beth Silvers.

== Background ==
Holland originally created the podcast to focus on women in politics. She and Silvers had previously discussed political topics on Holland's blog.

In their first episode, the hosts introduced themselves as "Sarah from the Left" and "Beth from the Right". Silvers later left the Republican Party after its nomination of Donald Trump in the 2016 presidential election.

== Reception ==
In its initial four years, Pantsuit Politics has been streamed over four million times.

In February 2021, the podcast was included in Apple Podcasts Spotlight. Later in December 2021, it was included in Apple Podcasts' "Shows of the Year" list.
