= Manjaagiin Ichinnorov =

Mongolian civil rights activist (born 1972)

- Born: 12 December 1970 (age 55); Khovd Province, Mongolia
- Education: National University of Mongolia; American University Washington College of Law
- Occupations: Lawyer, civil rights activist
- Known for: Strategic litigation and human rights advocacy in Mongolia

Manjaagiin Ichinnorov (Mongolian: Манжаагийн Ичинноров; born 12 December 1970) is a Mongolian lawyer and civil rights activist known for her work in strategic litigation and legal reform. She has been involved in a number of landmark cases addressing judicial accountability, prison conditions, and women's rights in Mongolia. Her advocacy has contributed to reforms in criminal procedure and detention practices.

== Education ==
Ichinnorov studied law in Russia before obtaining a master's degree in international legal studies from American University Washington College of Law. She later participated in executive education at Harvard University's Kennedy School of Government. She is an Eisenhower Fellowship Leadership Alumni (2005). She was also educated at the National University Law Faculty, Irkutsk, Russia and awarded a J.D. and master's degree in Law.

== Law cases ==
She has undertaken and won several landmark strategic litigation and human rights advocacy cases in Mongolia, which have reformed the legal system, such as the following cases:

=== 2002 "Erdene-Ochir Case" on Judicial Reform ===
The first Mongolian strategic litigation case successfully tried and won in 2002. A man wrongfully convicted of murder and sentenced to death penalty by three levels of courts (Sum, Aimag and Supreme Court) was freed through this strategic litigation case. The main goal of this case was to change old communist mentality of judges, promote the principle of "innocent until proven guilty", right to proper defense, principle of independence and fairness of the judiciary. As a result of this case, the procedures of trials have been changed and evidence must be compelling for the initiation of a trial.

=== 2003 "Ganbat Case" on prison reform ===
A young man died in a notorious detention center of Tuv aimag by contracting tuberculosis in his 2 years of lengthy detention while he confessed for his crime. The victim was never provided medical help from the State after requesting medical help during his 9 times of interrogation when his health was in extreme danger. For the first time in Mongolia, Ms. Ichinnorov Manjaa initiated a civil lawsuit against the Tuv aimag Police Department and Prosecutor's Office. This case lead to prison and detention center reform in Mongolia and Detention Centers came under the auspices of the Judicial Decision Execution Authority from the State Police Department. Living conditions have changed and medical help has been provided for detainees who have major health problems.

=== 2006 "Bolorchuluun Case" on Women's Rights ===
A young woman murdered in the hands of her partner after becoming a victim of defamation article in a newspaper, which featured her to have HIV/AIDS and spreading it around intentionally. She was also a victim of sexual harassment in local government custom office in Selenge aimag. Ms. Ichinnorov Manjaa created a documentary film and strategic litigation case against the person who murdered the victim. This documentary film was an excellent case study in Mongolia educating people on women's rights issues, especially hidden issues of sexual harassment and domestic violence. In addition, she aimed at raising awareness on judicial injustice and media ethics. Through this strategic case the defendant was successfully tried in court and justice was served. This case created awareness for media professionals for respect for human rights and dignities. The documentary film "In Search for Justice" successfully participated in a number of international human rights film festivals.

=== 2007 "Ariuntsetseg Case" on Criminal Law Reform ===
A seventeen-year-old young woman with a 17-day-old baby was sentenced to imprisonment for 10 years and 5 months for stealing 1,500 tugriks (equivalent of US$1). Amended 2005 Criminal Code of Mongolia had harsher criminal sentences for repeated incidents and minimum imprisonment was 10 years for stealing cases no matter the amount of damage done to society. This strategic litigation case was a high-profile case that attracted public and media attention. Law and policy-makers were very interested in this case and used as an example of scale of justice as compared to justice for the rich and poor. The main aim of this case was to create awareness on the equality before the law and court, advocate the principles of humane and just punishment, alternative sentencing and reform the Criminal Law and whole criminal justice system in Mongolia. The President of Mongolia, M. Enkhbayar, pardoned the woman and this was the most successfully tried case in Mongolia that people learned about a new concept of strategic litigation.

In 2015, she became a Chief of the Victim and Witness protection Department of the Mongolian Marshal Authority, a newly created agency within the Ministry of Justice of Mongolia.

== Activism and advocacy ==
Ichinnorov's work has focused on promoting human rights and legal reform in Mongolia through strategic litigation. Her cases have addressed issues such as wrongful convictions, prison conditions, gender-based violence, and disparities in criminal sentencing. Her advocacy has contributed to increased public awareness of legal rights and judicial accountability. In addition to her legal work, Ichinnorov has contributed to public discourse on social and political issues in Mongolia, including generational change and civil society development.

Additionally, she founded the Vision Institute, an organization providing training in personal development and civic engagement, in 2012.

== Awards and recognition ==
Ichinnorov has received several awards for her work in law and human rights, including the Mahatma Gandhi Award for "Fighting against Social Injustices with Peaceful Means" in 2007. She is also an Eisenhower Fellowship alumnus and received a Mongolian Professional Fellowship Award from the Open Society Institute.
