= Ken Sunshine =

American public relations consultant

- Born: March 12, 1948 (age 78)
- Education: Cornell University
- Occupation: Public relations consultant
- Known for: Founder of Sunshine Sachs Consultants
- Spouse: Nancy Hollander
- Children: 2

Ken Sunshine (born March 12, 1948) is an American public relations consultant, political adviser, and publicist. He is co-CEO and founder of Sunshine Sachs Consultants, founded in 1991. He began his career in New York City politics, including serving as chief of staff for Mayor David Dinkins. He later worked on Mario Cuomo's gubernatorial campaign and was an advisor to Andrew Cuomo.

== Early life ==
Sunshine was raised on Long Island and graduated from the School of Industrial and Labor Relations of Cornell University in 1970 where he was involved in activities to promote social change and political change.

== Career ==
=== Politics ===
Sunshine started as a community organizer and became a district delegate for George McGovern. He then ran the public relations department of ASCAP, where he supervised music events. In the 1970s, he joined Bella Abzug's Senate, mayoral and congressional campaigns with Harold Holzer.Also in the 1970s, Sunshine advised local and national campaigns on communications strategy. In 1980, he worked on Senator Ted Kennedy's unsuccessful campaign for the Democratic presidential nomination.

Sunshine served as deputy campaign manager during David Dinkins's successful mayoral campaign. From 1990 to 1991, Sunshine served as the chief of staff for Mayor David Dinkins, a job that included managing future New York City Mayor Bill de Blasio. In 1994, he worked on Mario Cuomo's gubernatorial campaign and is an advisor to New York Governor Andrew Cuomo. In 2013, he served on mayor-elect Bill DeBlasio's transition team. Sunshine also worked on Bill Clinton's run for president in 1992 and Hillary Clinton's 2016 campaign.

=== Sunshine Sachs Consultants ===
In 1991, Sunshine launched the public relations firm Ken Sunshine Consultants. The company was later renamed to reflect principal Shawn Sachs's partnership. The initial clients included Barbra Streisand, 1199: The National Health Care Workers' Union and the 1992 Democratic National Convention working with Ron Brown, then chairman of the Democratic Party.

Sunshine Sachs specializes in corporate image programs, crisis communication, reputation management and issues management, consumer and lifestyle marketing, public affairs, media relations, event promotion, and communications skills training. In 2014, Sunshine Sachs was named the number one public relations agency in New York by New York Observer.

Clients have included John Thain, Barbra Streisand, Leonardo DiCaprio Ben Affleck, and convicted sex offender Harvey Weinstein's film production company, Weinstein Co, as a corporate client. The firm also represented other films at Miramax. His best-known work includes representing Jussie Smollett who was criminally convicted for faking a hate crime as well as Justin Timberlake after Timberlake's Super Bowl XXXVIII performance with Janet Jackson in February 2004. As of 2009, nine-tenths of his clients were not celebrities. Sunshine’s name appears in the Epstein files, only in mention by another individual. In 2022, Sunshine Sachs became Sunshine Sachs Morgan & Lylis (SSM&L). Sunshine is co-chair to the NYC Mayor's Theatre and Live Performance Industry Council.

== Wikipedia editing for clients ==
In June 2015, Sunshine admitted his firm had employed paid editors to edit clients' Wikipedia pages to remove negative material about them, violating the Wikipedia updated terms of service. Sunshine Sachs said its employees failed to make public their relationship with the firm when making edits, and a key employee was unaware of Wikipedia's updated policies on paid editing. All employees engaged in editing Wikipedia now make appropriate disclosures, Sunshine said. Celebrities whose Wikipedia articles were edited by Sunshine Sachs include Naomi Campbell, Mia Farrow and Sarah Brightman. It was unclear if the celebrities themselves were aware of the edits.

The New York Times said an email to clients stated that "Sunshine Sachs has a number of experienced editors on staff that have established profiles on Wikipedia," and that "the changes we make to existing pages are rarely challenged." Sunshine said that he believed that his firm's edits to Wikipedia prior to June 2014, when the policy was changed, abided by Wikipedia policy.

== Personal life ==
He is married to Nancy Hollander and they have two children. His son, Jason Hollander Sunshine, a Columbia-trained lawyer, is married to Samantha Helen London, a Barnard College graduate whose father, Barry London, served as vice chairman and president of Paramount Pictures's motion pictures group.
