= Claire Bidwell Smith =

American therapist and author

- Born: May 21, 1978 (age 48); Atlanta, GA, U.S.
- Other names: Claire Boose; Claire Driver
- Education: The New School; Antioch University
- Occupation: Author - Therapist
- Spouse(s): Greg Boose (m. 2008; div. 2015) Mark Driver (m. 2018)
- Children: 3
- Website: www.clairebidwellsmith.com

Claire Bidwell Smith (born May 21, 1978) is an American therapist and author who specializes in grief. She is known for her memoir, The Rules of Inheritance, as well as her books After This: When Life is Over, Where Do We Go? and Anxiety: The Missing Stage of Grief. Smith draws on the personal loss of both of her parents and on her profession as a grief counselor to help others navigate grief and healing.

== Early life and education ==
Claire Bidwell Smith's parents were diagnosed with cancer within months of each other when she was fourteen. Her mother died when she was eighteen and her father when she was twenty-five. Smith speaks often about how the experiences of their illnesses and subsequent deaths inform the work she does today. She is a graduate of The New School in New York City, and received a master's in clinical psychology from Antioch University in Los Angeles, California.

== Writing ==
Smith's first book, The Rules of Inheritance (Penguin, 2012), is a memoir about losing both of her parents to cancer as a young adult. It was published 2012 and has since been published in 19 countries. It was chosen as a Barnes & Noble Discover Pick in 2012 and nominated for a Books for a Better Life award in 2013.The Rules of Inheritance is currently being adapted for film.

Her second book, After This: When Life is Over, Where to We Go? (Penguin, 2015), explores the afterlife. In this book, Smith draws on her personal loss and her background as a bereavement counselor. She was featured in the Los Angeles Times discussing her work in After This in 2015.

Smith's book is Anxiety: The Missing Stage of Grief (Hachette Books, 2018) explores the connection between grief and anxiety and offers strategies for healing after the loss of a loved one. Her work in this book received attention from The New York Times. Smith released further guidance for navigating grief and anxiety in the workbook Anxious Grief: A Clinician’s Guide to Supporting Grieving Clients Experiencing Anxiety, Panic, and Fear (PESI Publishing, Inc., 2023) in November 2023.

In Smith's most recent book, Conscious Grieving: A Transformative Approach to Healing from Loss (Workman, 2024), she offers a new framework for each stage of grief: Entering, Engaging, Surrendering, and Transforming. In this book, Smith combines her personal experience of loss with her long career spent working with thousands of people to introduce a new approach to grief.

== Notable work ==
Claire has written for and been featured in many publications including The New York Times, The Atlantic, The Washington Post, Scientific American, The Los Angeles Times, MSNBC, The Chicago Tribune, Goop, Oprah Magazine, and Psychology Today. She has been featured as an expert guest on MSNBC to discuss grief and the COVID-19 pandemic. Smith was the host of Lemonada Media's New Day podcast. Smith was a featured speaker at the 2023 End Well Symposium where she spoke on what she thinks healthcare can do better when it comes to caring for the dying and those who love them.
