= As Ever =

American food brand

- Formerly: American Riviera Orchard
- Industry: Food preserves and home goods
- Founded: 2024 (as American Riviera Orchard); 2025 (as As Ever)
- Founders: Meghan, Duchess of Sussex
- Headquarters: Santa Barbara, California, U.S.
- Area served: United States
- Key people: Meghan, Duchess of Sussex (CEO); Melissa Kalimov (COO)
- Owner: As Ever Enterprises, LLC
- Website: asever.com

As Ever (stylized as As ever), formerly known as American Riviera Orchard (abbreviated as ARO), is an American food brand created in 2024 by Meghan, Duchess of Sussex. Headquartered in Santa Barbara, California, the brand originally took its name from the region's nickname, the "American Riviera".

The company launched with an Instagram teaser and a website, followed by the release of a small batch of strawberry jam sent to selected recipients. Further product lines and a broader rollout followed.

== History ==
=== Creation ===
In September 2023, the tabloid news site TMZ wrote Meghan was planning on founding a lifestyle brand. Meghan filed for the patent for American Riviera Orchard in March 2024, followed by a soft launch of the company on social media channels the same month. The social media profiles included a link that sent social media users to the company's website, where they could sign up for the announcements waitlist. The New Zealand Herald said the creation of the brand likely coincides with Meghan's upcoming Netflix specials. In an op-ed for The Guardian, the columnist Arwa Mahdawi said the brand is likely Meghan's attempt to try to come back from what Rolling Stone called a "flop era" for the couple in mid-2023, a period of stagnation in their careers.

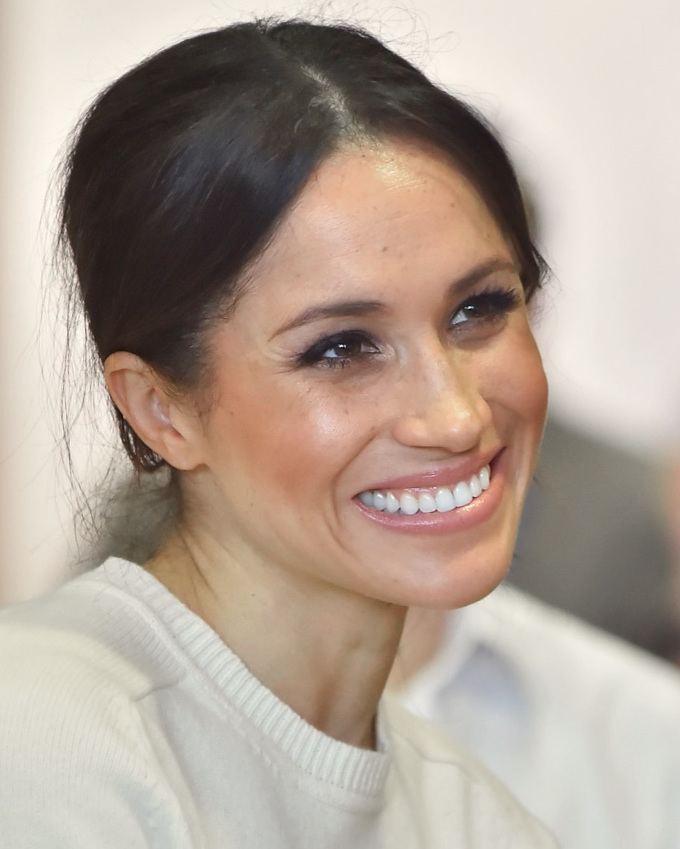
Meghan in 2018

The name American Riviera Orchard derives from a nickname for Santa Barbara, California, where Meghan and her husband Prince Harry, Duke of Sussex reside.

=== American trademark issues ===
In February 2024, the United States Patent and Trademark Office (USPTO) rejected a trademark request for the brand because of "a number of inconsistencies in her trademarking documents to do with the categorisations of her products." In September of the same year, the USPTO again rejected a trademark request for the brand, stating common names for geographic locations cannot be trademarked and the O in Orchard did not match the description in the application documents and it was not apparent it was a letter.

In October 2024, the food company Harry & David filed a protest with the USPTO, claiming that American Riviera Orchard is too similar to their own Royal Riviera trademark. According to the USPTO, the letter of protest was reviewed at the end of October. The attorney assigned to examine the letter concluded that no further action needed to be taken.

=== UK domain name cybersquatting ===
In April 2024, an anonymous cybersquatter purchased the UK domain name for the brand and directed the URL to a JustGiving fundraiser for The Trussell Trust, a non-profit focusing on alleviating food insecurity. A message on the fundraiser voiced support for Catherine, Princess of Wales. The campaign had a goal of reaching £1,000 and far outpaced that by quickly raising over £8,300 by April 19. By April 29, the amount had grown to £21,000. The Trust told The Independent that they "are grateful to people who put their time and energy into supporting our work to end the need for food banks in the UK. The charity is not connected with this website domain and have no knowledge of who set it up." Due to regulatory guidance in the UK, The Trussell Trust could not decline the donations.

=== Alleged staff exits and search for CEO ===
In August 2024, the British tabloid Closer reported 18 staff members had exited the business. As of November that year, seven months into the brand's announcement, a CEO had allegedly not been found to lead the business.

According to Us Weekly, Closer's claims are untrue. Similarly, The Cut confirmed that there are no other verified reports of a staff exodus and difficulty finding a CEO. The British tabloid Daily Mirror and the Scottish tabloid Daily Record claimed that Meghan named herself CEO in early December after a "fruitless" search for one. The original source of this claim is Richard Eden, a royal reporter for the British tabloid Daily Mail.

=== Renaming ===
On February 18, 2025, and ahead of the premiere of her Netflix show, Meghan announced that the company's name would be changed to As Ever. The name change raised concerns with two small business owners in the US sharing the same name, a vintage clothing company in New York and New Jersey As Ever and a photography company, As Ever Photography. The United States Patent and Trademark Office had partially rejected her application for trademark in 2023 because the firm's name was too close to the name of the Chinese clothing outlet ASEVER.

In addition, As Ever's logo which features a palm tree flanked by two birds identified as hummingbirds prompted reactions from Spanish officials in Porreres, Mallorca, because of its similarity to the town's coat of arms which also features a palm tree flanked by two birds, however, the birds on the town's seal are swallows. The town's mayor, Xisca Mora, stated that she was seeking legal counsel on how to approach the issue.

=== Netflix withdrawal ===
In March 2026, it was announced that Netflix, which was promoting the brand in conjunction with Meghan's lifestyle show, would be ending their partnership and the brand would evolve independently. According to Variety, Netflix had footed the bill for building and developing the brand up to that point.

== Products ==
=== Strawberry jam ===
After the company's soft launch in March 2024, Meghan sent 50 jars of strawberry jam to select friends and public figures. Some of the recipients then posted the jam on their social media channels. Among them were Argentine polo player Nacho Figueras; actresses Tracee Ellis Ross, Abigail Spencer, Garcelle Beauvais, and Mindy Kaling; media personality Kris Jenner; and singer John Legend and his wife, model Chrissy Teigen.

After the release of the limited edition jam, an unknown source claimed on Sky News that sales of Meghan's father-in-law Charles III's unrelated strawberry jam, which is sold through The Highgrove Shop and through Waitrose Duchy Organic at Waitrose supermarkets, increased substantially. Some news outlets and tabloids speculated American Riviera Orchard engaged in purposeful competition with Charles, with Marie Claire calling it "the battle of the strawberry jams" and OK! calling it "royal jam rivalries". Conversely, Marie Claire also pointed out Buckingham Palace's decision to promote its own strawberry jam on social media just days after Meghan sent out samples of American Riviera Orchard's jam.

=== Other products ===
Along with strawberry jam, Meghan released announcements the brand would be working on raspberry jam, dog treats, and homeware items, including tableware and drinkware. In late June 2024, Marie Claire speculated the next product would likely be a rosé wine. As of March 2025, the As Ever website listed raspberry jam, honey, three herbal teas, shortbread cookie mix, crepe mix, and "flower sprinkles" as upcoming offerings. The products were launched on April 2 and made available for shipping across the United States and sold out within minutes. The company plans to release additional products seasonally, gradually extending its range to include items related to hosting and household goods.

In June 2025, it was reported that the brand's spreads and herbal teas were supplied by The Republic of Tea, while its newly launched Napa Valley rosé wine was made in collaboration with Fairwinds Estate and bottled at the Kunde Family Winery. In October 2025, As Ever released its inaugural holiday collection, which in addition to fruit spread and honey included mulling spice kits, a vintage Napa Valley brut, and hand-poured candles. These have included candles inspired by her wedding and her children. In December 2025, the brand released a line of chocolate bars in collaboration with chocolatier Compartés.

== Reception ==
In a since-deleted yet widely cited article, the royal author Tom Quinn wrote that the launch of the brand was greeted with intense scrutiny and "mockery" online, while the conservative news channel Sky News Australia said the launch was "ridiculed". In October 2024, journalist Tina Brown claimed that Meghan's unprofessionalism had impacted the brand's ability to release any product and called her ideas "total crap". The brand's first collection of products — including items such as raspberry spread, herbal teas, crêpe mix, shortbread cookie mix and decorative flower sprinkles — sold out in less than one hour after going live on 2 April 2025, with Meghan celebrating on social media, though the quantity of items sold was not publicly disclosed.
