= With Love, Meghan =

American lifestyle series by Meghan, Duchess of Sussex

- Promotional poster with original premiere date
- Genre: Lifestyle
- Directed by: Michael Steed
- Starring: Meghan, Duchess of Sussex
- Country of origin: United States
- Original language: English
- No. of seasons: 2
- No. of episodes: 16 (+ 1 special)

Production
- Executive producers: Meghan, Duchess of Sussex; Chanel Pysnik; Aaron Saidman; Eli Holzman; Leah Hariton
- Producer: Qadriyyah Shamsid-Deen
- Production location: Montecito, California
- Editors: David Isser; Michael Chaskes; Kevin Hibbard; Martin Biehn; Gasper Chiaramonte; Jeff Marcello; Alex Wall
- Running time: 28–41 minutes
- Production companies: Archewell Productions; The Intellectual Property Corporation

Original release
- Network: Netflix
- Release: March 4 – December 3, 2025

With Love, Meghan is an American lifestyle television series hosted and executive produced by Meghan, Duchess of Sussex. It premiered on Netflix on March 4, 2025.

== Synopsis ==
The concept of With Love, Meghan is officially described thus:

"This inspiring series, produced by Meghan, Duchess of Sussex, reimagines the genre of lifestyle programming, blending practical how-to’s and candid conversation with friends, new and old. Meghan shares personal tips and tricks, embracing playfulness over perfection and highlights how easy it can be to create beauty, even in the unexpected. She and her guests roll up their sleeves in the kitchen, the garden and beyond, and invite you to do the same."

== Cast ==
=== Host ===
- Meghan, Duchess of Sussex

=== Notable guests ===
Season 1

- Mindy Kaling, American actress
- Roy Choi, Korean-American chef
- Delfina Blaquier, Argentine socialite
- Abigail Spencer, American actress
- Jennifer Rudolph Walsh, American literary agent
- Victoria Jackson, American entrepreneur
- Vicky Tsai, American businesswoman
- Alice Waters, American chef

Season 2

- David Chang, American chef
- Christina Tosi, American chef
- Chrissy Teigen, American television personality
- Tan France, British-American television personality
- Samin Nosrat, Iranian-American chef
- Jamie Kern Lima, American entrepreneur
- Jay Shetty, British life coach
- Clare Smyth, Northern Irish chef
- José Andrés, Spanish-American chef

Holidays Special

- Naomi Osaka, Japanese professional tennis player
- Tom Colicchio, American chef
- Will Guidara, American restaurateur

== Episodes ==
Season	Episodes	Originally released
1	8	March 4, 2025
2	8	August 26, 2025
Special		December 3, 2025

=== Season 1 (2025) ===
No. overall	No. in season	Title	Directed by	Original release date
1	1	"Hello, Honey!"	Michael Steed	March 4, 2025
When Meghan's friend Daniel Martin comes to visit, she prepares a thoughtful guest basket, then harvests honey for DIY beeswax candles and a sweet treat.
2	2	"Welcome to the Party"	Michael Steed	March 4, 2025
Fellow toddler mom Mindy Kaling drops by Montecito to help Meghan plan a kid-friendly tea party in the garden. But first, frittatas and parfaits.
3	3	"Two Kids from LA"	Michael Steed	March 4, 2025
Chef Roy Choi bonds with Meghan about growing up in Los Angeles, while teaching her a foolproof way to cook with spicy Korean flavors.
4	4	"Love Is in the Details"	Michael Steed	March 4, 2025
Meghan and her polo pal Delfina Figueras enjoy a hike in the great outdoors, followed by an afternoon picnic featuring fresh, homemade focaccia.
5	5	"Surprise and Delight"	Michael Steed	March 4, 2025
Meghan hosts her longtime friends Abigail Spencer and Kelly Zajfen for a breezy ladies' lunch, then shares an easy tip for everyday flower arrangements.
6	6	"The Juice Is Worth the Squeeze"	Michael Steed	March 4, 2025
When Meghan's girlfriends come over for game night, a local chef pops into the kitchen to help her prepare a gourmet taco bar.
7	7	"Elevating the Everyday"	Michael Steed	March 4, 2025
Meghan assembles a harvest basket for her friend and neighbor Vicky Tsai, then they make Vicky's potsticker recipe and enjoy home beauty treatments.
8	8	"Feels Like Home"	Michael Steed	March 4, 2025
To celebrate her new business, Meghan and chef Alice Waters whip up fresh California cuisine for a brunch party with family and friends.

=== Season 2 (2025) ===
No. overall	No. in season	Title	Directed by	Original release date
9	1	"A Sweet and Savory Adventure"	Michael Steed	August 26, 2025
Meghan welcomes Christina Tosi, David Chang, and Daniel Martin for a cozy day of baking tarts and s'mores, flower arranging, and playful water-marbled crafts.
10	2	"It's Way Past Our Bread-time"	Michael Steed	August 26, 2025
In a get-together, Meghan and Chrissy Teigen swap stories over homemade Cheez-Its, Thai boba, and sentimental jewelry crafts, holding conversations about early career memories.
11	3	"Easy as Pie"	Michael Steed	August 26, 2025
Tan France joins Meghan for a hangout featuring fruit platters, French toast, and pie-making, while they chat about parenting and the camping trip where Meghan first knew she loved Prince Harry.
12	4	"How 'bout Them Apples"	Michael Steed	August 26, 2025
Meghan and chef Samin Nosrat gather apples from her yard to create fruit leather and apple butter, dive into handmade bookbinding, and reflect on the roast chicken dinner that led to her royal proposal.
13	5	"Spice Up Your Life"	Michael Steed	August 26, 2025
Ayurvedic cooking meets intentional living as Meghan teams up with Jay Shetty and Radhi Devlukia to cook vegan dishes, craft soothing soaps, and discuss mindfulness and modern family values.
14	6	"Just for the Halibut"	Michael Steed	August 26, 2025
Chef Clare Smyth joins Meghan in preparing seafood dishes and buttery rolls, while Meghan shares how a post-wedding fried chicken recipe turned into a family favorite.
15	7	"A Weekend Away"	Michael Steed	August 26, 2025
Meghan escapes to Malibu with a close friend for a creative weekend filled with cookies, bath bombs, and cocktails—plus her personal tips on packing with care and memory-driven keepsakes.
16	8	"A High Tide Raises All Boats"	Michael Steed	August 26, 2025
Chef José Andrés helps Meghan throw a seaside-style feast of paella, oysters, and lobster, wrapping up the season with a backyard meal shared by the entire team.

=== Holiday Celebration special (2025) ===
No. overall	No. in season	Title	Directed by	Original release date
17	1	"Holiday Celebration"	Michael Steed	December 3, 2025
Meghan welcomes familiar and new friends to celebrate the holidays with her, showcasing her go-to traditions, creative crafts, and festive recipes.

== Production ==
In September 2020, the Duke and Duchess of Sussex signed a private commercial deal with Netflix to "develop scripted and unscripted series, film, documentaries, and children programming for the streaming service." The five-year partnership is worth an estimated $100 million. In April 2024, Deadline Hollywood reported that the Duke and Duchess of Sussex were in the process of developing two non-fiction projects with Netflix via their Archewell Productions banner. One would be a cooking and gardening show featuring Meghan, and will see her "celebrate the joys of cooking, gardening, entertaining, and friendship."

With Love, Meghan was announced on January 2, 2025. Critics noted that its first trailer was released one day after the Duchess of Sussex returned to Instagram; she had deleted her personal account three months before her wedding to Prince Harry. Meghan executive produced the series alongside Chanel Pysnik, its showrunner Leah Hariton, and the Intellectual Property Corporation's Aaron Saidman and Eli Holzman. Michael Steed directed all eight episodes, which were filmed at a farmhouse near Meghan and Harry's residence in Montecito, California. The series was initially set to premiere on January 15, 2025, however the premiere was postponed to March 4, 2025, amid the series of wildfires affecting Southern California.

On March 7, 2025, Netflix announced that filming for a second season had been completed, and was set to be released in the fall of 2025. Netflix will not be producing a further season of the series given that 2025 saw Prince Harry and Meghan's original Netflix deal "axed". Also filmed around the same time as seasons one and two was a holiday special, With Love, Meghan: Holiday Celebration with its release being delayed until December 2025. Seasons one and two of the series were filmed in late spring-early summer of 2024, with the holiday special being filmed shortly afterwards.

== Reception ==
=== Audience viewership ===
Season 1 of the show ranked among Netflix's Global Top 10 TV shows in terms of viewership in 47 countries within a day after its release. The season reached 12.6 million hours viewed in its first week on Netflix. It garnered 5.3 million views in the first half of 2025, ranking 383 by the end of June among all of Netflix's productions.

Season 2 of the show failed to reach the Top 10 TV Shows list. The Holiday Special similarly failed to reach the Top 10 TV Shows list.

=== Critical response ===
On Rotten Tomatoes, the series has an overall 23% approval rating. On Metacritic it has an average of 40 out of 100 based on 21 critic reviews and is categorized as "mixed or average".

==== Season 1 ====
Calling the show "ultimately uncompelling", MSNBC's cultural critic Brian Moylan asked: "Why these recipes? Why this show? Why now? Why her?". Rolling Stone's Louis Staples dismissed the show as "just a girl, standing in front of fans asking them to love her". Variety's chief correspondent Daniel D'Addario described it as "a Montecito ego trip not worth taking" and added that it "is made with a great deal of love — in the sense that the greatest love of all is the one that a person has for herself." In a piece for Vanity Fair, Anna Peele concludes that "The duchess reveals her married last name, if little else, in With Love, Meghan, a show about a lifestyle that is enviable, if not attainable." Judy Berman writing for Time magazine called the show boring and said "With Love, Meghan is a dusting of flower sprinkles that can't hide the blandness of the cookie—a polite but distant dispatch from a rented kitchen down the road in lieu of truly welcoming us into her life." The Hollywood Reporter stated that the show failed to fulfil its promise of "candid conversation with friends, new and old" and echoed other reviewers that the show lacked a key ingredient of relatability. Olivia Craighead, pop culture and celebrity writer at The Cut, wrote an unfavourable review of the series, concluding that the show lacked charisma and was pointless. In a review for Vogue magazine, Michelle Ruiz stated that the series was underwhelming specifically because it is a lifestyle show that does not invite viewers into Meghan's life and thus felt impersonal.

Vulture culture critic Kathryn VanArendonk called the show "an utterly deranged bizarro world voyage into the center of nothing", noting that the show was meaningless and unrelatable. Similarly, Nadira Goffe, culture staff writer at Slate, echoed the show's lack of relatability and added that it did not reach the level of aspirational attainability that these types of shows often need to succeed. Writing for Screen Rant, Ben Gibbons rated the show 3 out of 10 and claimed that Meghan put on a façade while aiming for authenticity and genuine experiences. He added that the show was detached from reality and lacked useful guidance. In Decider's "Stream It or Skip It" segment, writer Liz Kocan states that the show is a disappointment for viewers who value authenticity and recommended viewers skip it. For the same publication, Meghan O'Keefe stated that the show "is beautifully directed by Michael Steed, but lacks any clarity of purpose." In her review for the Australian Broadcasting Corporation, Yasmin Jeffery argued there was "absolutely nothing ground breaking" about the show, adding that it "is the kind of show you put on your big screen while doing something else on your smaller screen." Writing for The Irish Times, Ed Power described the series as "Martha Stewart by way of Gwyneth Paltrow's Goop, with a sprinkling of the "tradwife" Instagram – only the worst possible version of all three, with Markle a black hole of beige throughout."

In a piece from Town & Country, Emily Burack wrote, "Meghan Markle shines in With Love, Meghan when she's the student." Harper's Bazaar's review, written by Bianca Betancourt, lends a thematic breakdown of the show, saying "It's clear from watching With Love that the duchess has an eye for tiny details (think burlap bows, calligraphy-enhanced signage, and freshly-picked flowers for every occasion), but that doesn't mean the meals she's making aren't approachable." In a piece for TheWrap, Kayleigh Donaldson gave the show a positive review and stated that the show makes for a good advert for Meghan's upcoming lifestyle website. Natasha Pearlman, writing for Glamour gave the show a positive review and stated that the show should be enjoyed as a fluffy, cozy and warm show that is a fantasy of a life. The Standard gave the show four stars and answered the question "will this series fly?" with "for laughs perhaps." It continued, "But if you're the kind of person who wants to be shown how to make a daisy chain or gets a thrill from the home life of our Duchess as she wants us to see it, or who wants tips on making pasta the way no Italian ever did...why it'll be just your cup of tea. In a glass pot, natch."

Writing for The Guardian, Stuart Heritage described the show as "pointless", adding that "With Love, Meghan is the sort of gormless lifestyle filler that, had it been made by the BBC, would be used to bulk out episodes of Saturday Kitchen." The Guardian's review, written by Chitra Ramaswamy, gave the show one out of five stars, saying that "what With Love, Meghan vibrates with most is a vacuous, over styled joylessness." The Economist called the show out of touch and questioned Netflix's decision to award Meghan a $100 million deal. Katie Rosseinsky of The Independent also gave the show one out of five stars, stating, "The heady blend of aesthetic curation, inspiring truisms and those inescapable edible flowers might well leave you feeling a bit queasy." In her review for The Times, Carol Midgley gave the series two out of five stars and summarized it as "a duchess presenting her extreme wealth and mind-bogglingly exclusive lifestyle as if it is available to anyone who cares enough to pop a twee personal label on a homemade beeswax candle or lay a sprig of fresh lavender on a towel." Writing for The Telegraph, Anita Singh gave the series two out of five stars and described the show as "an exercise in narcissism", which consists of Meghan inviting "celebrity pals" who "tell her how amazing she is. This happens for eight episodes." Rachel Cooke called the show "a brazen, turmeric-inflected, lavender-infused punt. One sniff, and you know you're not buying" in the New Statesman.

==== Season 2 ====
The Hollywood Reporter's Brande Victorian dismissed season 2 as a "twice-failed attempt at relatability" which was "all the more painful to watch, again." Lucy Mangan of The Guardian gave the second season two out of five stars and described it as "so boring, so contrived, so effortfully whimsical". Anita Singh of The Telegraph also gave the series two out of five stars and argued that "It's more of the same" and the "episodes live or die by the quality of the guests".

==== Holiday Special ====
The special has a 14% approval rating on Rotten Tomatoes from 7 critic reviews. Writing for The Guardian, Lucy Mangan gave the special two out of five stars and characterized it as an emetic barrage of Meghan "literally skipping through a Christmas tree farm", offering "reindeer chow" that looks like "animal droppings", and staging "darling" holiday moments, leaving the viewer feeling "offended and harmed". In her review for The Telegraph, Anita Singh gave the special one out of five stars and believed the special was "quite mad and a little bit sad", featuring Meghan "making a vegetable crudité wreath out of raw broccoli and desperation", offering obvious holiday tips, and greeting guests with "manic intensity". In her review for The Times, Hilary Rose portrayed the special as an "unfathomable" hour in which Meghan puts "Christmas into therapy", dispenses "implausible" lines, and stages a cascade of "moronic to trite" moments culminating in her husband Harry confirming he hates the "beetroot salad". Writing for The Washington Post, Monica Hesse found the series as an unexpected and disappointing turn in her post-royal life, drawing a parallel to Wallis Simpson and using her as a lens to question how Meghan's media projects align with the future she once seemed to envision. Writing for British Vogue, Daisy Jones believed while some moments felt like wealthy people trying to be "relatable", the show was "soothing" and fits the "ambient TV" category—"comforting, temperate, nothing-y-but-in-a-good-way" viewing for Christmas.

=== Nominations ===
Year	Award	Category	Nominee	Result	Ref.
2026	53rd Daytime Emmy Awards	Outstanding Lifestyle Program	With Love, Meghan	Nominated	
