= Lemonada Media =

American Podcast Company

- Industry: Podcasting
- Founded: 2019; 7 years ago
- Founder: Stephanie Wittels Wachs; Jessica Cordova Kramer
- Website: lemonadamedia.com

Lemonada Media is an American podcast network. The company was founded in 2019 by Jessica Cordova Kramer and Stephanie Wittels Wachs. In 2019, Lemonada Media debuted their first podcast, Last Day, offering a personal view on the opioid crisis in the U.S. (Kramer and Wachs both had younger brothers who died from an accidental opioid overdose.)

As of 2023, Lemonada has launched more than 40 podcasts, including Wiser Than Me with Julia Louis-Dreyfus, which was named the 2023 Apple Podcast of the Year, and Being Trans/ Being Golden, which pioneered an unscripted format similar to reality TV, and won three Webby Awards in 2023.

== History ==
In 2018, Cordova Kramer and Wittels Wachs met after discovering they had each lost a brother to accidental overdoses. Cordova Kramer reached out to Wittels Wachs after hearing her in an interview. Wittels Wachs initially said no to a podcast partnership with Cordova Kramer but later changed her mind. In 2019, they launched Lemonada Media and their first podcast, Last Day which explores the final days of people who have died to opioids, suicide, and gun violence. The company set out to make the hard things in life a little easier for listeners to cope with. The company's name refers to the adage "turning lemons into lemonade" as well as the famous Jerry Seinfeld standup routine where he says "(the car) better not be a lemona, or I'll call my lawya"

Last Day is Lemonada Media's flagship podcast. The first season focused on the opioid epidemic. The first episode covered the last days of Cordova Kramer's brother prior to his fatal overdose. The second season of Last Day focused on suicide and was sponsored by The Jed Foundation, a nonprofit focused on suicide prevention.

In 2019, Lemonada Media debuted two additional podcasts, Good Kids and As Me with Sinéad. In April 2020, In the Bubble hosted by Andy Slavitt debuted. In March 2022, Lemonada Media had more than 20 original shows. These include The Cost of Care, The Untold Story: Policing and Good Sex.

In 2020, Lemonada show In the Bubble won the "Favorite Shows" award of Apple Podcasts "Shows of the Year". Last day also won iHeartRadio's Podcast Award for Best Wellness and Fitness Podcast. Lemonada shows received an average of two million listens in each month of 2020.

Lemonada partnered with Neighborhood Villages in late 2020, an organization that advocates for policy reform for early childhood education and care, to create No One Is Coming to Save Us hosted by former ABC news correspondent Gloria Riviera. The podcast discusses the U.S. childcare system. Kristin Bell has made guest appearances.

In 2021, Lemonada added 10 podcasts to its network including, Written Off and Believe Her. Believe Her debuted at the top of the podcast ratings charts. They launched, BEING Studios, a new division to develop a new audio genre called Audio Reality, a cross of reality programming and podcasting. Their debut show, BEING Trans was executive produced by Kasey Barrett who has previously worked on Keeping Up with the Kardashians, The Real World, and Born This Way. Wittels Wachs stated that creating Being Trans was intended to build the empathy. The second season of BEING studios features senior citizens and is called BEING Golden.

In 2022, Add to Cart won the iHeartRadio Podcast Award for Best Beauty and Fashion Podcast.

Lemonada has a global presence with its two shows in Europe: As Me with Sinéad (Ireland) and In Giro Con Fra (Italy).

== Organization ==
Jessica Cordova Kramer is the company's CEO. She previously served as the executive producer of Pod Save the People. Stephanie Wittels Wachs is the company's chief creative officer. She previously published the book: Everything is Horrible and Wonderful.

In 2020, the company reported $1.5 million in revenue. In 2021, they reported nearly $5 million in revenue. In January 2022, Lemonada Media announced they had secured $8 million in Series A funding and had 43 full-time employees.

== Podcasts ==
Title	Host(s) or Starring	Notes	Ref
Add to Cart	SuChin Pak and Kulap Vilaysack	Focuses on consumerism	
After 1954	Aimée Eubanks Davis	Explores Brown v. Board of Education Case	
As Me With Sinéad	Sinéad Burke	Discusses self-acceptance, self-love, empathy, and biases	
BEING Golden		Discusses life as a senior in the golden years. From BEING Studios Audio Reality®	
BEING Trans		Explores life experiences of transgender individuals. First show in the new Audio Reality genre from BEING Studios Audio Reality®	
Believe Her	Justine van der Leun	Discusses the story of criminalized survivor Nikki Addimando and examines domestic and sexual violence and trauma	
Blind Plea	Liz Flock	Examines the American criminal justice system	
Burnout	Connor Franta	Examines burnout	
Call Declined	Melissa Beck	Explores resilience, friendship, the power of creativity, mental health, and the American prison system	
Call For Help	Stephanie Wittels Wachs and Zak Williams	Explores mental health and the national 988 Suicide & Crisis Lifeline	
Choice Words with Samantha Bee	Samantha Bee	Examines navigating the real world, life choices, and decision making	
Confessions of a Female Founder	Meghan, Duchess of Sussex	Interviews with female business founders and entrepreneurs	
Discarded	Gloria Riviera	Examines the health and environmental impacts of plastic use	
Everything Happens with Kate Bowler	Kate Bowler	Explores success, failure, suffering, happiness, and humor	
Fail Better with David Duchovny	David Duchovny	Explores the topic of failure	
FIRST! with Kareem Rahma	Kareem Rahma	Discusses people who have had groundbreaking impacts on racial barriers, society, and culture	
Funny Cuz It's True with Elyse Myers	Elyse Myers		
Good Grief		Explores grief, coping, love, and loss	
Good Kids		Discusses parenting	
Good Sex		Discusses sex	
Hard Feelings with Jennette McCurdy	Jennette McCurdy	Explores difficult life experiences	
Here Lies Me	Hillary Frank, Michael Chernus, June Diane Raphael, W. Kamau Bell, Rob Huebel, Stephanie Wittels Wachs	Lemonada's first scripted podcast. Discusses the adolescent experience with realism. Explores harassment, classism, sexism, racism, trauma, consent, and finding your voice	
I Need To Ask You Something	Dr. Monica P. Band	Explores difficult conversations, emotional health, and relationship building	
I'm Sorry	Mohanad Elshieky, Kiki Monique, and Hoja Lopez	Discusses cancel culture and apologies	
In Giro Con Fra	Francesca Lazzarin	Lemonada's first non-English language podcast, hosted in Italian. Discusses culture, lifestyles, and personal challenges	
In Recovery with Dr. Nzinga Harrison	Dr. Nzinga Harrison	Explores psychiatry, mental health, and addiction medicine	
In the Bubble with Andy Slavitt	Andy Slavitt	Covers the COVID-19 pandemic	
Last Day	Stephanie Wittels Wachs	Flagship podcast on Lemonada's podcast network. Explores grief, the opioid epidemic, suicide, and gun violence	
Let's Tawk with Jaime Primak Sullivan	Jaime Primak Sullivan		
Mouthpeace	Michael Bennett and Pele Bennett	Discusses parenting and football	
New Day	Claire Bidwell Smith	Covers coping strategies	
No One Is Coming to Save Us	Gloria Riviera and Kristin Bell	Covers childcare in America	
Our America with Julián Castro	Julián Castro	Discusses politics	
Raised by Ricki	Ricki Lake	Covers cultural issues	
The Letter			
The Cost of Care	David Smith	Problems within America's healthcare system	
The Sarah Silverman Podcast	Sarah Silverman	Covers cultural issues	
The Untold Story	Jay Ellis	Covered policing issues	
Threedom	Scott Aukerman, Paul F. Tompkins, and Lauren Lapkus	Focuses on the basics of being funny with each other	
Uncared For	SuChin Pak		
V Interesting with V Spehar	Vitus Spehar		
Wiser Than Me	Julia Louis-Dreyfus	Interviews with wise women on their life experiences	
Written Off	Walter Thompson-Hernandez	Covers social justice and features formerly incarcerated writers	
Pantsuit Politics	Sarah Stewart Holland and Beth Silvers	Covers Women in Politics and bi-partisan discussions	

Lemonada had plans to expand the number of shows to more than 30 in 2022.

=== After 1954 ===
In 1954, the Supreme Court ruled in the case of Brown v Board of Education that the segregation of white and Black students was unconstitutional. The After 1954 podcast, hosted by Aimée Eubanks Davis, explores this historic event and its unintended consequence–the firing of approximately 38,000 Black teachers in the Southern states. Davis also explores the importance of Black educators as key figures in the lives of Black children.

=== Add to Cart ===
Add to Cart is co-hosted by journalist SuChin Pak and writer, comedian, and director Kulap Vilaysack. Their podcast focuses on shopping and consumerism, exploring trending products and discussing whether those products are worth the cost.

=== As Me with Sinéad ===
As Me is hosted by teacher, fashion enthusiast, and disability activist Sinéad Burke. Burke has also given a TED Talk on design accessibility, and was a guest speaker at the World Economic Forum in Davos. Burke has a suite of high-profile guests on her podcast including Victoria Beckham and Jamie Lee Curtis. Burke has also made a guest appearance on Lemonada Media's podcast Good Kids.

=== Wiser Than Me with Julia-Louis Dreyfus ===
Launched in 2023, Wiser Than Me features host Julia Louis-Dreyfus interviewing women older than her on their lived experience and earned wisdom. Guests have included Jane Fonda, Carol Burnett, Isabel Allende and Amy Tan. The show was named Apple's Best Podcast of the Year in 2023.

== Reception and awards ==
Lemonada and its podcasts have received positive reviews in a wide range of press. The New York Times describes Lemonada as "a podcast network that creates feel-good stories about feel-bad issues (...) Their roster of sweet-tart shows is deeply personal, mission-driven and solution-minded."

Lemonada has been nominated for more than 15 podcast industry awards, including:

- Wiser Than Me with Julia Louis-Dreyfus was named Apple's Best Podcast of the Year in 2023.
- Last Day has earned 9 Webby nominations, including 3 wins: It won the 2023 Webby Award winner for Best Individual Podcast Episode (Documentary) and was a 2020 honoree for Best Podcast (Health & Wellness) and Best Individual Podcast Episode
- Being Trans/ Being Golden won 3 Webby Awards in 2023: Best Podcast (Experimental & Innovation), Best Podcast (Diversity, Equity & Inclusion) and the Webby People's Voice Award for Best Podcast (Experimental & Innovation).
- Add to Cart won the 2022 Webby Award for Best Lifestyle Podcast
- Believe Her was an honoree for the 2002 Webby Award for Best Crime & Justice Podcast
- In the Bubble won the 2022 Webby Award for Best Podcast (Health, Wellness & Lifestyle) and was nominated for the 2022 Webby Award for Best Podcast Host (Andy Slavitt)
- No One is Coming to Save Us was an honoree for the 2022 Webby Award for Public Service & Activism podcasts
