= Conversations With Myself (book) =

2010 collection of Nelson Mandela's works

Conversations With Myself is a 2010 collection of Nelson Mandela's speeches, letters, conversation and some of his publications. It is a continuation of his 1994 book Long Walk to Freedom.
