= Pod Save the People =

American political podcast

- Genre: Political
- Language: English

Creative team
- Created by: DeRay Mckesson, Jessica Cordova Kramer

Cast and voices
- Hosted by: DeRay Mckesson, Kaya Henderson, De'Ara Balenger, Myles E. Johnson

Production
- Length: 60–90 minutes

Publication
- Original release: May 2, 2017
- Provider: Crooked Media
- Updates: Weekly

Related
- Website: crooked.com/podcast-series/pod-save-the-people/

Pod Save the People is an American political podcast produced and distributed by Crooked Media. The show was created, and is hosted by activist DeRay Mckesson with co-hosts Kaya Henderson, De'Ara Balenger and Myles E. Johnson.

Mckesson talks about culture, social justice, and politics by exploring the history, language, and people who are shaping the struggle for progress — and talking about the steps that each of us can take to make a difference. When asked about the podcast's purpose, Mckessen said: "It is about creating space for conversation about the most important issues of the week. It is also about making sure people have the information they need to be the most thoughtful activists and organizers".

Notable guests have included Edward Snowden, Senator Cory Booker, soccer player Megan Rapinoe, Reverend Al Sharpton, singer John Legend, TV host Ricki Lake and singer Katy Perry.

Earlier analysts on the show included Samuel Sinyangwe, Clint Smith, and Brittany Packnett.

== Reception ==
The old podcast logo

Pod Save the People reached No. 2 on the iTunes American podcast chart on April 28, 2017. It was ranked No. 98 as of July 1, 2020.

The A.V. Club noted that "For an audience increasingly hungry for quality discussion of deadly serious matters like health care, this show will likely be eagerly consumed".

Pod Save the People has won 6 podcast industry awards, including 3 Webby Awards for Best News and Politics Podcast and a Webby Award for Best Podcast Host.

== See also ==
- Political podcast
