= Horrible Science (stage show) =

Horrible Science is a 2010 stage show and is a spinoff of the Horrible Science book series. It is one of the "Live on Stage" theatre shows produced by the Birmingham Stage Company. The show is written by Nick Arnold and is recommended for ages 6–14. It ran at Town Hall, Birmingham. Its running time is 1 hour 46 minutes, including interval. The show is directed by Phil Clark, and designed by Jacqueline Trousdale. Its original cast included Benedict Martin and Laura Dalgleish.

== Production ==
BSC actor and manager Neal Foster said: "Science was not my best subject at school! So we're determined to make this show the solution for all those children who felt like I did – and to inspire the lucky ones who are already intrigued".

Nick Arnold said "First of all the stage show is about entertainment, on top of that it uses better 3D than you see in the cinema, and finally it is education". He added that "What is really clever about the production is that it is actually a story on a very fundamental level. It was written by people who really understand how a play works and they made sure the script wasn't too technical so it wouldn't go out of date and doesn't need constant updates."

== Synopsis ==
Birmingham Mail explains "it tells the story of Billy Miller who enters the mad theme park world of Horrible Science. With time against him, Billy has to battle lots of hideous facts and factors to ensure life can go on."

The play "covers much of the Key Stage 2 Science curriculum".

== Reception ==
The show received a rating of 3.9 out of 5 on Ticketmaster based on 65 audience reviews.

The Stage said "It's fair to say that the four actors are completely upstaged by the huge screen layout that is their backdrops", and added that "When giant poos, speeding meteorites and voracious microbes are coming straight at you out of the screen, science seems at once the horriblest, most brilliant subject in the world."

The Public Reviews gave it a rating of 3 out of 5 stars, concluding that "Science wise, it's not going enlighten a young audience, but for entertainment value it's a good show." Camden Review said "this is a perfect show for all the family, giving children the chance to enjoy educational topics."
