= Byline Festival =

Festival of independent journalism

Coordinates: 51.057°N 0.054°E

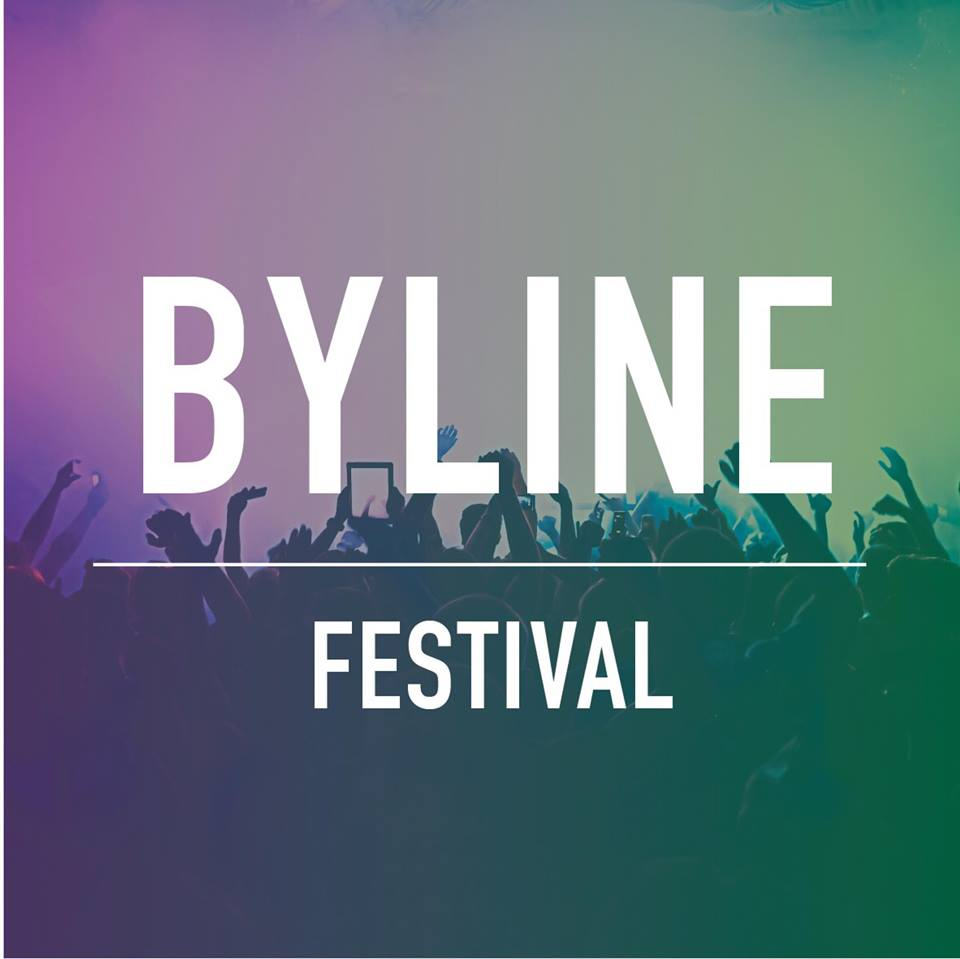
- Status: Active
- Genre: Music festival, independent journalism and free speech
- Frequency: Annually
- Locations: Pippingford Park, England
- Years active: 9 years
- Inaugurated: 2 June 2017
- Founder: Stephen Colegrave and Peter Jukes
- Most recent: 14 July 2023 – 16 July 2023
- Next event: 2024
- Organiser: Bylinefest Limited
- People: Salena Godden John Mitchinson
- Website: bylinefestival.com

The Byline Festival is a festival whose aim is to promote independent journalism and free speech. The festival was founded by Stephen Colegrave and Peter Jukes in 2017. Its tagline is "Dance, Discuss, Laugh and Change the World".

== History ==
=== 2017 ===
The first festival was held at Pippingford Park near Nutley, East Sussex, from 2 June to 4 June 2017.

More than 2,500 people were in attendance, including John Cleese, Andy Hamilton, Hardeep Singh Kohli, Jay Rosen and Martin Bell.

=== 2018 ===
The 2018 Byline Festival was partnered by the Frontline Club and took place from 24 August to 27 August at Pippingford Park.

Those present included Happy Graveyard Orchestra, Alexei Sayle, John Cleese, June Sarpong, Bonnie Greer, Martin Bell, Tom Watson MP, Baroness Warsi, Lord Adebowale, Damian Collins MP, Kate Mosse, A L Kennedy, Gary Lineker, Joanna Scanlan, Nick Davis, Salena Godden, Madeleina Kay. Other events included circus, theatre, drama, poetry and music, as well as children's activities.

Musical acts at the 2018 festival included Pussy Riot, Joey Base, Badly Drawn Boy, The Blow Monkeys, The Vapors, Tom Hingley from Inspiral Carpets, Rhoda Dakar, the Courtesans, Dramarama, Hows Harry, The Members, Sunstreets, Excursia, and the Priscillas. The theatre section was headlined by FoolishPeople.

The Cambridge Analytica whistleblowers Chris Wylie, Shahmir Sanni and John Ford were present, along with Carole Cadwalladr.

The festival had five main stages which were tents in the forest. These hosted 150 talk sessions and over 100 workshops. In the evening, tents provided entertainment including immersive theatre, rap battles and live art demonstrations. The festival fringe included Idler, BBC Virtual Reality, The Fourth Group, Overtake and Frontline Club.

=== 2019 ===
Byline Festival 2019 was held in Pippingford Park from 23 to 26 August.

Speakers included John Cleese, Pussy Riot, Carole Cadwalladr, Bonnie Greer, Victor Adebowale, Misha Glenny, Caroline Orr, Luke Harding, Anthony Barnett, John Niven, Birgitta Jonsdottir, Shahmir Sanni, Damian Collins MP, Roger Law, Mike Stuchbery, Hardeep Matharu, Otto English, John Mitchinson, and Jonathan Barnbrook.

Entertainment was provided by: Pussy Riot, Badly Drawn Boy, Extinction Rebellion Rebel Rebel Stage, Lowkey, Matt Bianco, The Blow Monkeys, Priscillas, Kevin Rowland DJ Show, Jerry Dammers (founder of The Specials and Two Tone), Joanna Scanlan, Don Letts, Big Audio Dynamite, Salena Godden, Don Mescall, Department S, Wag Club, Hardeep Singh Kohli, Balaclava Blues, Livewire Poets, Bad Press Awards, Citizens of the World Refugee Choir, House of Comedy, and DJ Professor Gramophone.

Other events included: Never Again Convention, Walk a Mile in My Shoes, Human Library, Frontline Club M.A.S.H. Tent, Frontline Club Documentary Tent, The Idler, The Magpie and the Wardrobe, Belarus Free Theatre's Kitchen Revolution, and MJ's Community Choir.

=== 2022 ===
Due to the Covid-19 pandemic, the Bylines Festivals for 2020 and 2021 were postponed until 2022. Byline Festival 2022 took place in Acklam Village Market, North Kensington, London from 29 April to 1 May 2022.

It held a mix of inquisitive journalism, free speech, comedy, music, and entertainment. It featured: Jonathan Pie, Joanna Scanlan, Rio Ferdinand, David Harewood, Carole Cadwalladr, Sanjeev Baskar, Lord Adebowale, Luke Harding, Dawn Butler MP, Anthony Barnett, Annette Ditter, Musa Okwonga, Bonnie Greer, Hardeep Matharu, Peter Jukes, Otto English, Ian Lucas, Rebecca Vincent, Lee Lawrence, Maria Purkiss, Salena Godden, Don Letts, The Citizens of the World Refugee Choir, Samba Band, United Strings of Europe, Tokyo Taboo, the House of Comedy, and "The Bad Press Awards 2022".

On 2 May 2022, the festival came under fire after a video was posted by a band named Tokyo Taboo in which the band's set was interrupted by the festival promoter, who confiscated the drummer's drumsticks to stop them from playing, the festival organisers and venue owner subsequently apologised to the band, citing noise complaints from neighbours as the reason for the set being cut short.

=== 2023 ===
Byline 2023 was run by the Dartington Trust based near Totnes in Devon from 14 to 16 July.

It featured Bonnie Greer OBE, Rosie Holt, George Monbiot, Lord Victor Adebowale CBE, Carole Cadwalladr, Peter Oborne, Hardeep Matharu, Marina Purkiss, Anthony Barnett, Alexandra Hall Hall, Dawn Butler MP, Adam Bienkov, Jemma Forte, Peter Jukes, John Sweeney, Otto English, Tom Cox, Patrick McCabe, Jackie Morris, Martin Shaw, and Jay Griffiths.
