= George Fouracres =

British actor and comedian (born 1990)

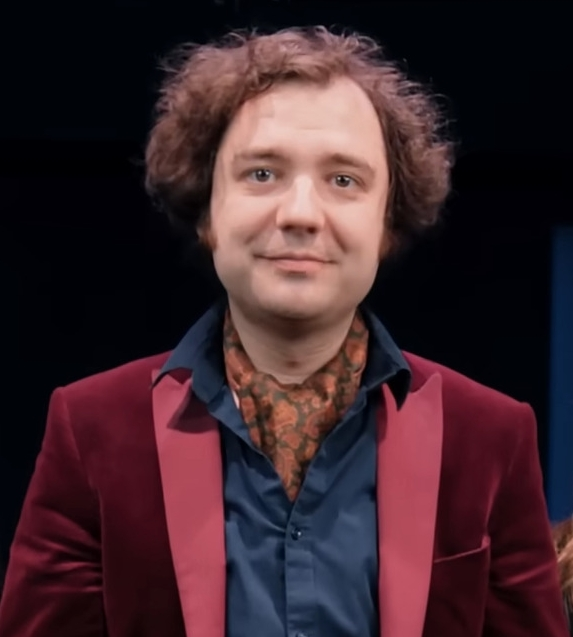
- Fouracres promoting One Man Musical in 2025
- Born: 10 October 1990 (age 36); Wolverhampton, England
- Other name: George Potts
- Education: Homerton College, Cambridge
- Occupations: Actor, comedian
- Years active: 2014–present
- Known for: Daphne; Saturday Night Live UK

George Fouracres (born 10 October 1990) is a British actor and comedian. He has been a cast member of Saturday Night Live UK since the first series, which started airing in 2026.

== Early life ==
Fouracres was born and raised in Wolverhampton to a family of four. He has Irish ancestry on his father's side.

He attended Homerton College, Cambridge, where he studied in the Department of Anglo-Saxon, Norse and Celtic (with Pierre Novellie), learning Mediaeval Gaelic, and was a member of Cambridge Footlights. While in Footlights, he performed under the name "George Potts". In 2012, he was a part of the Footlights Tour Show alongside Jason Forbes, Pierre Novellie, Emma Powell and Phil Wang.

== Career ==
In 2014, he formed the comedy trio Daphne with Phil Wang and Jason Forbes, whom he met in Footlights. In 2015, their first show at the Edinburgh Fringe, Daphne Do Edinburgh, was nominated for a "Best Newcomer" award.

As a voice actor, Fouracres has voiced characters on radio shows such as The Lenny Henry Show, The Now Show, Newsjack, and Ross Noble's Britain in Bits, as well as Daphne's radio series Daphne Sounds Expensive in 2016. He voiced Prince Harry, amongst other characters, on the revived Spitting Image series in 2020. As a television actor, he has appeared on shows including Raised by Wolves (2016), Drunk History (2017), and Murder, They Hope (2021).

In 2022, he hosted his own special on BBC Radio 4, Black Country Gentlemon, which spoke about his upbringing in Wolverhampton. He appeared as Hamlet in Sean Holmes' production at the Sam Wanamaker Playhouse having already appeared in other productions by Holmes at Shakespeare's Globe including The Merry Wives of Windsor, A Comedy of Errors and A Midsummer Night's Dream.

In 2024, Fouracres starred as Andrew Lloyd Webber in One Man Musical, written and composed by duo Flo and Joan, who appeared in the show as backing musicians. The show was also performed at the that year's Edinburgh Fringe and at the Soho Theatre. The show also had a run at the Underbelly Boulevard Soho in January–March 2025. One Man Musical received a four out of five stars rating from The Guardian.

In 2026, Fouracres joined the original cast of Saturday Night Live UK where he became known for portraying Prime Ministers Keir Starmer and Andy Burnham in the show's cold opens.

== Personal life ==
Fouracres has bipolar II disorder, which he talked about on his Instagram account when he made a post on World Bipolar Day (which is celebrated on 30 March every year). He also has autism, which he mentioned on a post on his birthday on his Instagram account on 10 October 2026.

== Filmography ==
=== Television ===
Year	Title	Role	Notes
2015	The Scandalous Lady W	Clerk	Television film
2016	Raised by Wolves	Charlie	One episode
2016—2017	Drunk History	English soldier (2016), actor (2017)	Two episodes
2018	Pls Like	Henry Bloyd Smith	Three episodes
2019	Whiskey Cavalier	Hugh Cabot	One episode
2020	Semi-Detached	Customs official	One episode
2020	Spitting Image	Various voices	Four episodes / voice role
2021	Murder, They Hope	Forensic 2	One episode
2022	Don't Hug Me I'm Scared	Grolton and Hovris	Three episodes / voice role
2024	The Franchise	Dave	Two episodes
2026–present	Saturday Night Live UK	Various roles	Main cast
2026	Ted Lasso	Donnie	One episode

=== Film ===
Year	Title	Role
2016	Chubby Funny	Caucasian man at door
2017	Out the Window: Comic Relief	
2022	Accident Man: Hitman's Holiday	Dante Zuuzer
2025	Steve	Angus

== Edinburgh Fringe shows ==
Year	Title	Notes
2015	Daphne Do Edinburgh	As a part of Daphne
2016	Daphne's Second Show	As a part of Daphne
2017	Daphne: The Best of Daphne	As a part of Daphne
2019	George Fouracres: Gentlemon	Solo show
2024	One Man Musical	Alongside Flo and Joan
