= Heidi Specogna =

Swiss filmmaker (born 1959)

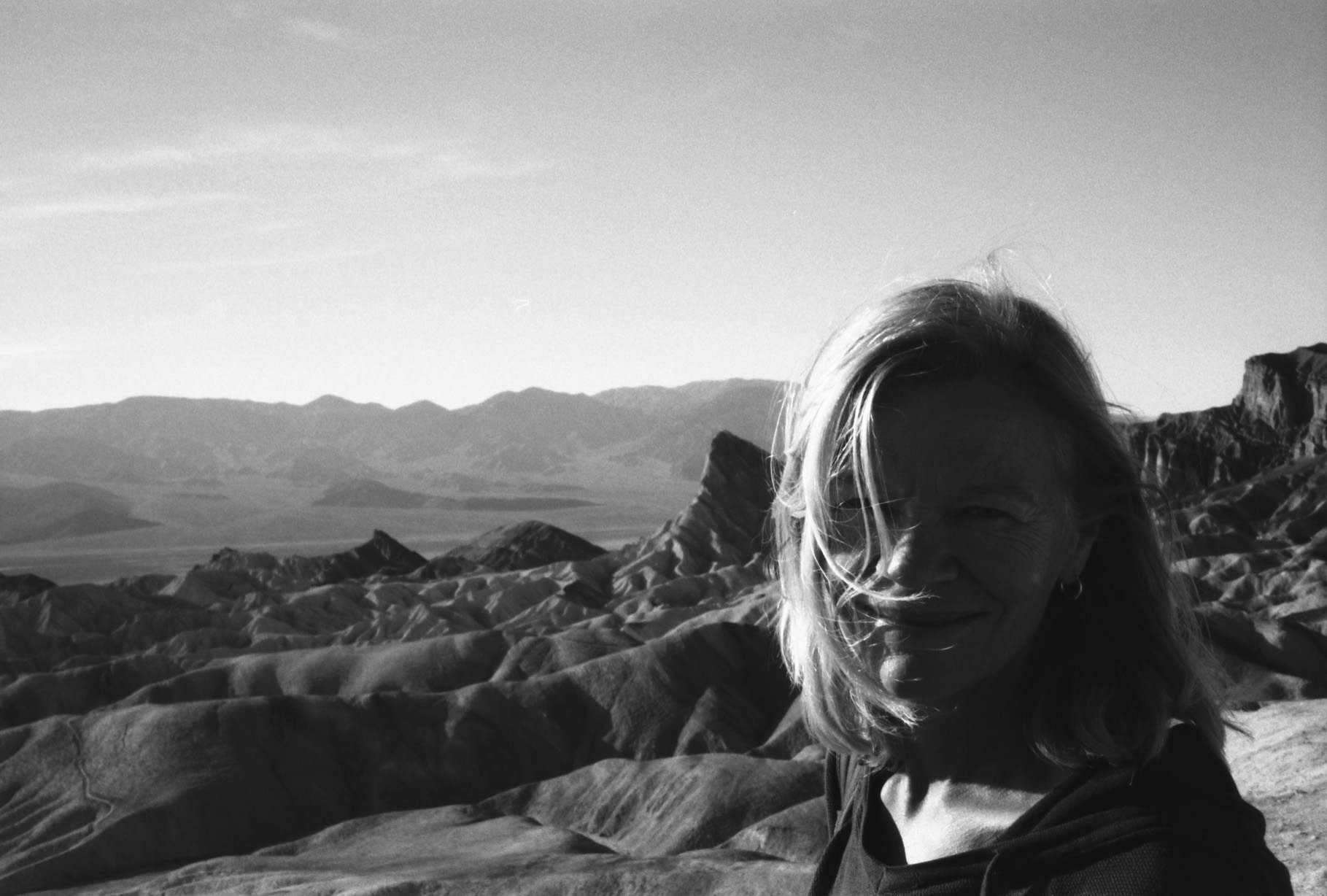
- Born: Heidi Specogna; 5 January 1959 (age 67); Biel/Bienne, Switzerland
- Education: German Film and Television Academy
- Occupations: Director, producer, editor, cinematographer, lecturer
- Years active: 1988–present
- Website: http://www.heidispecogna.de

Heidi Specogna (born 5 January 1959) is a Swiss filmmaker. She has contributed to the South American and African cinema by making the critically acclaimed films, Das kurze Leben des José Antonio Gutierrez, Cahier africain and Tupamaros.

== Personal life ==
She was born on 5 January 1959 in Biel/Bienne, Switzerland.

== Career ==
She attended the journalism school in Zurich and then worked as a journalist for various German-Swiss press media. Then she studied at the German Film and Television Academy in Berlin from 1982 to 1988. After graduating from the academy, she became a lecturer at the Film Academy Baden-Württemberg for documentary film since 2003. In 1985, her short film Traces won the Bern Film Prize.

She focused largely on cinema of Latin America and Africa for her filmmaking particularly through her own production house founded in 1990. In 1991, she made the debut with the documentary Tania la Guerillera about the Bolivian guerrilla fighter 'Tamara Bunke'. In 1993, she made the film Rosa about the illegal activity of a radio operator for the Rote Kapelle. Then in 1996 she played the role Tupamaros, a guerrilla movement from Uruguay, in the documentary of the same name.

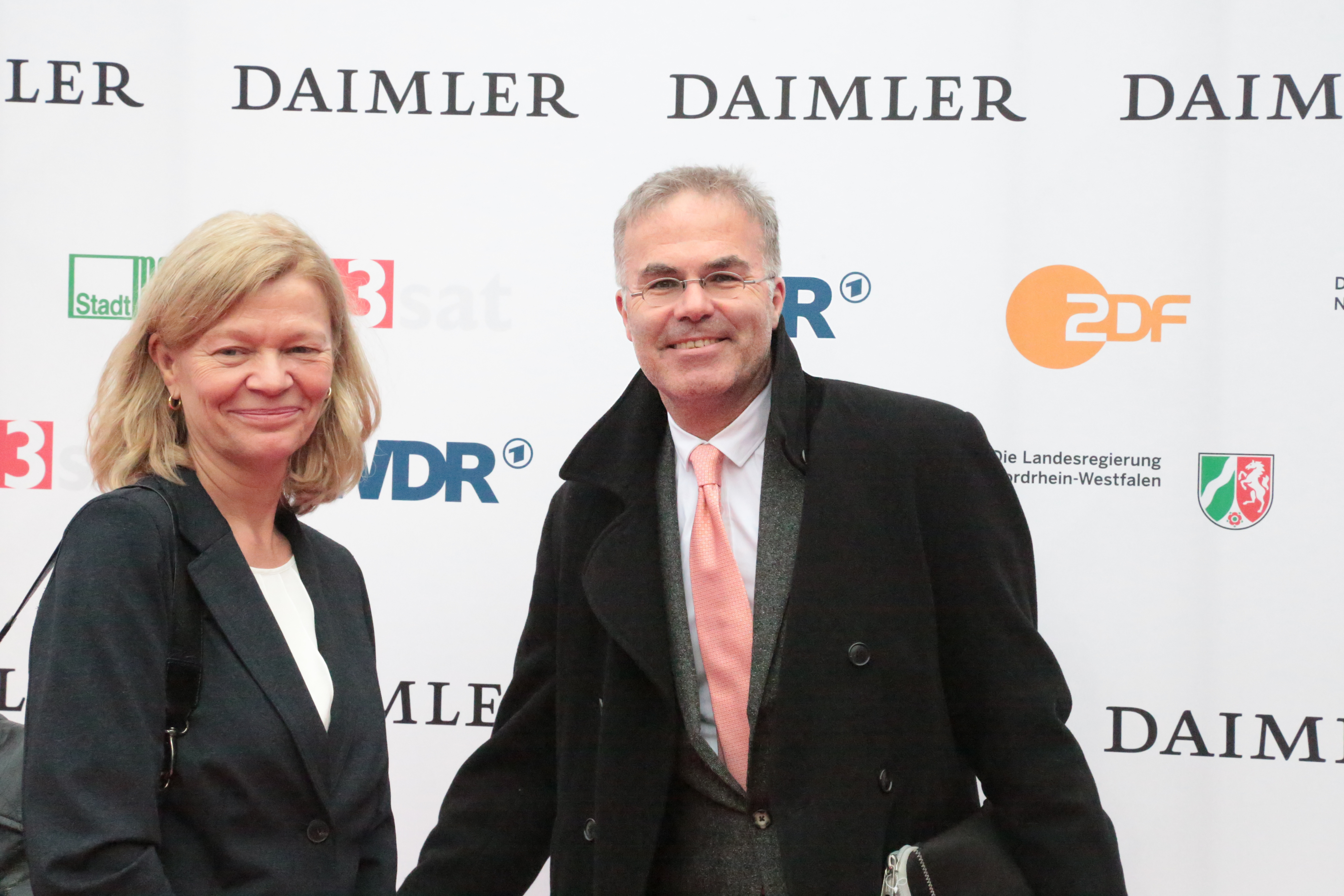
Heidi Specogna and Johann Feindt in Grimme-Preis 2018

In 2011 she made the documentary Carte Blanche which is focused on the Central African Republic. Her film The Short Life of José Antonio Gutierrez won the Swiss Film Award 2007 for best documentary and the Adolf Grimme Prize. Then the film Carte Blanche was named the best German-language documentary film in Duisburg in 2011 and later awarded the Catholic Media Prize. The film Goal hunter's ship received the prize of the youth jury in Leipzig and her 'girl story' titled Esther und die Geister was awarded the German human rights prize. In 2017, her film Cahier Africain based on the crisis-ridden Central African Republic, received the German Film Prize Lola, as well as the Swiss Film Prize for Best Documentary at the German Human Rights Film Prize, as well as the Silver Dove in Leipzig and in 2018 the Adolf Grimme Prize.

In 2019, Specogna awarded with the Konrad Wolf Prize at the Academy of the Arts. In 2020, The Solothurn Film Festival dedicated the special program “Rencontre” to Specogna for remembering her contribution to the African cinema.

In 2022 the Munich International Documentary Film Festival dedicated an homage to her filmmaking.

== Filmography ==
Year	Film	Role	Genre	Ref.
1985	Fährten	Director, writer, cinematographer, editor	Short film	
1988	Dschibuti	Director, writer	Short film	
1991	Tania - La Guerrillera	Director, writer, producer	Documentary	
1994	Deckname: Rosa	Director, writer	Documentary	
1995	Z-man's Kinder	Director, writer, producer	Film	
1997	Tupamaros	Director, writer, producer	Documentary	
2004	Eine Familienangelegenheit	Director, writer	TV movie documentary	
2004	Zeit der roten Nelken	Director, writer	Documentary	
2006	The Short Life of José Antonio Gutierrez	Director, writer, producer, photographer	Documentary	
2009	24 Hours Berlin	Director	Film	
2010	Das Schiff des Torjägers	Director, writer	Documentary	
2011	Carte Blanche	Director, writer, producer	Documentary	
2012	Mädchengeschichten	Director, writer	TV series documentary	
2014	Pepe Mujica - Lessons from the Flowerbed	Director	Documentary	
2016	Cahier Africain	Director, writer	Documentary	

== Awards and accolades ==
- 2007: Swiss Film Award in the Best Documentary Film category for The Short Life of José Antonio Gutierrez
- 2008: Adolf Grimme Prize for The Short Life of José Antonio Gutierrez
- 2011: 3sat documentary film award for Carte Blanche
- 2012: German Human Rights Film Award for Esther and the Ghosts
- 2013: Catholic Media Prize for Carte Blanche
- 2016: German human rights film award for Cahier africain
- 2017: Swiss Film Prize and German Film Prize LOLA for Cahier africain (Best Documentary)
- 2019: Konrad Wolf Prize

== See also ==
- Jonathan Akpoborie
- 16th Busan International Film Festival
- Political cinema
- Salena Godden
- Hispanics in the United States Marine Corps
