= Salena Godden =

English poet, author, activist

Salena Godden FRSL
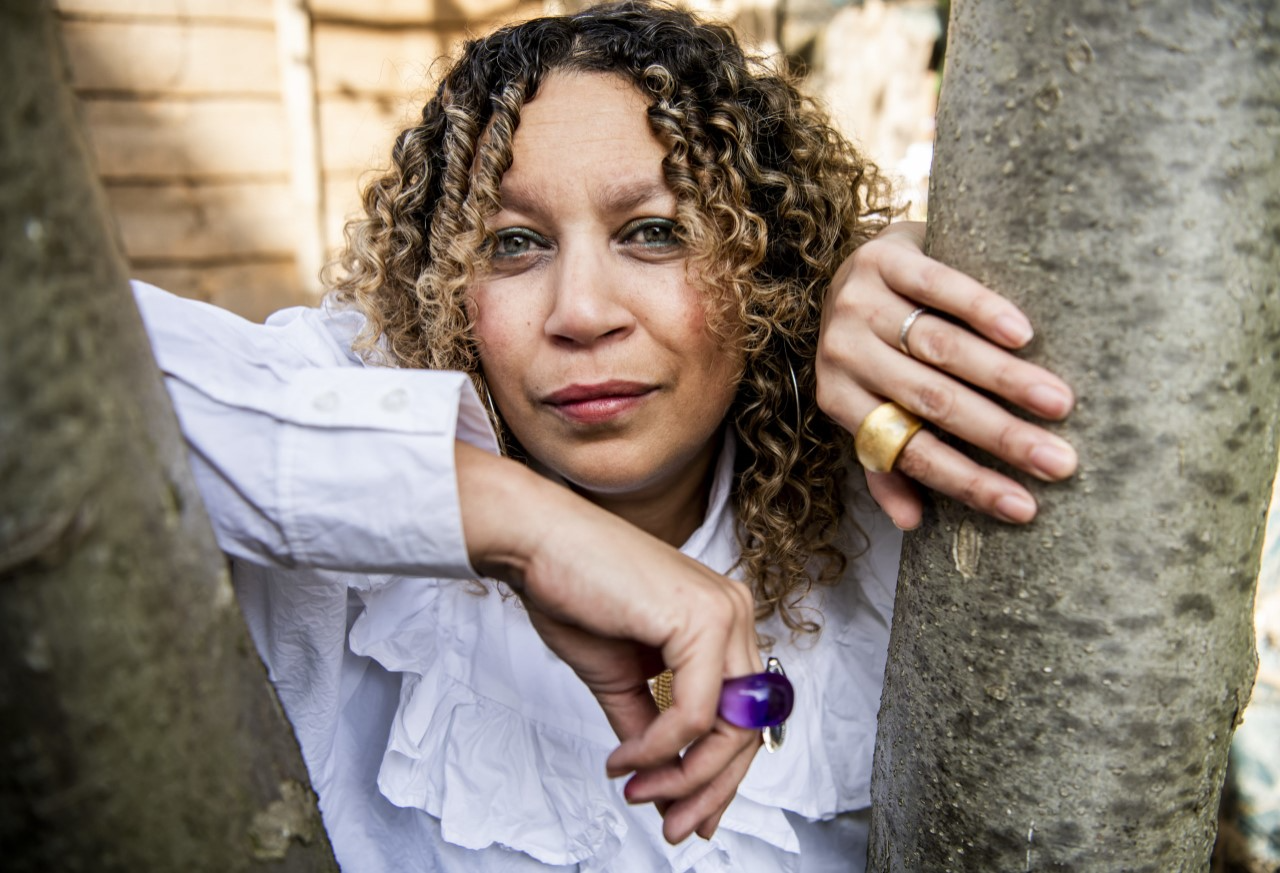

Background information
- Born: Hastings, Sussex, U.K.
- Occupations: Poet, author, activist, broadcaster, memoirist, essayist.
- Years active: 1994–present
- Website: www.salenagodden.co.uk

Salena Godden is an English poet, author, activist, broadcaster, memoirist and essayist. Born in Hastings, UK, of Jamaican-Irish heritage, Godden is based in London. Widely anthologised, she has published several books. She has also written for BBC TV and radio and has released four studio albums to date.

== Biography ==
Godden's published books include poetry volumes Under The Pier (Nasty Little Press), Fishing in the Aftermath: Poems 1994–2014 (Burning Eye), and literary childhood memoir Springfield Road (Unbound Books).

Her latest publication, Pessimism Is For Lightweights – 13 pieces of Courage and Resistance, was published by Rough Trade Books in July 2018 in the first Rough Trade Editions series. The poem "Pessimism is for Lightweights" was a public poetry art piece on display outside the Arnolfini Gallery in Bristol for more than 18 months. The title of the poem was originally written by the author John Higgs as part of a talk he gave at the launch of the play Cosmic Trigger. Higgs later commissioned Godden to write the poem as part of the podcast to mark the publication of his book Watling Street.

Now in her third decade producing work, Godden is the author of powerful comic poetry anthems: "My Tits Are More Feminist Than your Tits", "Imagine If You Had To Lick It" and "Can't Be Bovvered". Throughout September 2019, her period-politics piece "RED" was included as an art installation for a women-led exhibition, The Most Powerful Woman In The Universe, curated by artist and painter Kelly-Anne Davitt at Gallery 46, Whitechapel.

Essays have included "Shade" published in award-winning anthology The Good Immigrant (Unbound), edited by Nikesh Shukla; "Skin", broadcast on The Essay, BBC Radio 3; "We are The Champions", published in Others (Unbound); and most recently "Broken Biscuits", edited by Sabrina Mahfouz, and published in Smashing it! Working class artists on life, art and making it happen (Saqi).

Godden's first solo poetry album, LIVEwire, was released in 2017/2018 on CD, vinyl 2LP and in print with indie spoken-word label Nymphs and Thugs. This work was shortlisted for the Ted Hughes Award. Godden's Live at Byline Festival EP was released in October 2018, also with Nymphs and Thugs.

New work, the short film Is There Anybody Out There? (Back of the internet), was commissioned by Google and BBC Arts as part of their Rhyme and Reason BBC Arts programme, which aired in October 2019 and is currently on BBC Four, BBC iPlayer.

Her debut novel is Mrs Death Misses Death. A BBC Radio 4 documentary about the writing of Mrs Death Misses Death was broadcast throughout December 2018. The programme followed the work-in-progress over 12 months. The novel is described by the publisher, Canongate Books, as an "electrifying genre- and form-defying firestarter" and was published in January 2021. Mrs Death Misses Death was longlisted for the 2021 Gordon Burn Prize. Canongate are contracted to publish three further books by Godden: another novel, a memoir and a collection of poetry.

She was elected a Fellow of the Royal Society of Literature in 2020.

Godden's live poetry performances include: March For Women, Trafalgar Square; HUH at the LSO with the London Symphony Orchestra; Superjam at the British Library with The Last Poets; the Stoke Newington Literary Festival; Festival of Debate with Helen Pankhurst; The Women's March, Parliament Square; Port Eliot Festival; Green Gathering; curator of the LIVEwire stage and Poet Laureate at Byline Festival; The Women's Peace Council, Parliament Square; Edinburgh International Book Festival; Out-Spoken, The Purcell Room, South Bank; and Writers Rebellion, Trafalgar Square.

Godden is represented by OWN IT!, a literary, film and TV agency.

Salena Godden is known for the graphic power of her work and, over time, she has fostered a reputation as one of the foremost performance poets in the UK. She crowdfunded and published Springfield Road, a memoir of her childhood, with Unbound in 2014. In addition to this, she has released two poetry collections: Fishing In The Aftermath (Burning Eye Books, 2014) and Under The Pier (Nasty Little Press, 2011). Her essay "Shade" featured in the 2016 anthology The Good Immigrant (Unbound) which won the 2016 Book of the Year’s Readers' Choice Award. Her performance of her poem 'Titanic' was featured in the critically acclaimed BBC spoken word programme We Belong Here, and in 2017 her album LIVEwire was shortlisted for the Ted Hughes Award for new work in poetry. A very active writer, and a dedicated mentor, Godden regularly advises and coaches poets who are new to the spoken-word scene, while also teaching writing in schools.

— Poetry International Web, July 2017

=== Film credits ===
Cahier Africain – a feature film documentary about the humanitarian crisis in Central Africa Republic produced by award-winning German director Heidi Specogna with English narration by Godden. The film was awarded the Premio Zonta Club Locarno award by the jury of the Semaine de la critique - Locarno for its humanitarian value and the Silver Dove.

Brakes – premiered at the Edinburgh Film Festival, Brakes is an independent UK debut, a dark improvised comedy directed and written by Mercedes Grower. It stars Noel Fielding, Julia Davis, Julian Barratt and many other familiar faces of British comedy. Its UK television premiere was on Film4 in 2018.

=== Radio highlights ===
- BBC Radio 4 - Stir it up documentary
- BBC Radio 4 - Little Miss Cornshucks documentary
- BBC Radio 4 - A Valentine at Waterloo radio play
- BBC Radio 3 - 'Skin' The Essay
- BBC Radio 4 - Loose Ends with Clive Anderson
- BBC Radio 3 - The Verb with Ian McMilan
- BBC Radio 4 - Poetry Please with Roger McGough
- BBC Radio 2 - Jonathan Ross Show
- BBC Radio 4 - Mrs Death Mrs Death documentary
- Soho Radio - Morning Glory with James Endeacott
- BBC Radio 4xtra - Telling Tales
- BBC Radio 4xtra - Comedy Club

== Selected publishing: books and anthologies ==
=== Salena Godden books ===
- 2011: Under The Pier - Nasty Little Press
- 2014: Fishing In The Aftermath Poems 1994–2014 - Burning Eye
- 2014: Springfield Road - a childhood memoir - Unbound Books
- 2017: LIVEwire - album and book - Nymphs and Thugs
- 2018: Pessimism is for Lightweights - 13 pieces of courage and resistance - Rough Trade Books
- 2021: Mrs Death Misses Death - Canongate Books
- 2025: With Love Grief and Fury - Canongate Books

=== Poetry anthologies ===
- 1998: The Fire People - Payback Books / Canongate
- 2000: IC3 - New Black Writing - Penguin
- 2003: Velocity - Black Spring Press
- 2006: The Salzberg Review - Salzberg Review
- 2009: Dwang 1, 2 & 3 - Tangerine Press
- 2011: Raconteur - Parthian Books
- 2012: Liminal Animal - Tongue Fu
- 2013: Bang Said The Gun - Burning Eye
- 2016: Untitled Two - Neu Reekie - Polygon Books
- 2018: The Dizziness of Freedom - Bad Betty Press
- 2019: Eighty Four - Verve Press
- 2019: Midnight Feasts - Bloomsbury
- 2019: Poems For A Green and Blue Planet - Hachette Publishing
- 2019: What is Masculinity? Why does it matter? And other big questions - Hachette Publishing
- 2020: "Galway Dreaming" - She Will Soar - Pan Macmilian
- 2020: "It isn't pirate to seek permission" - HOW TO: Be More Pirate - OWN IT!

=== Short fiction and essay anthologies ===
- 2001: Vox n Roll - Serpent's Tail
- 2004: Tell Tales - Tell Tales
- 2005: Croatian Nights - Serpent's Tail
- 2006: The Decadent Handbook - Dedalus Books
- 2009: Punk Fiction - Portico
- 2010: MIR Review 7 - Birkbeck University
- 2011: Sixty-Six Books - Oberon Books
- 2012: Too Much Too Young Anthology - Bookslam
- 2013: Connecting Nothing With Something - Influx Press
- 2016: The Good Immigrant - Unbound Books
- 2016: The Unreliable Guide to London - Influx Press
- 2017: Bare Lit Anthology - Brain Mill Press
- 2019: Others - Unbound Books, London
- 2019: Smashing It: Working Class Artists on life, art and making it happen - Saqi, Westbourne Press

== Discography ==
- 2018: Salena Godden / Live at Byline Festival EP, Nymphs and Thugs
- 2017: Salena Godden / LIVEwire (live spoken-word album), Nymphs and Thugs
- 2007: Salena Godden/ Promise Of Gold TwoFive, Apples & Snakes
- 2007: SaltPeter/ Hunger’s The Best Sauce album, FRED Records
- 2007: SaltPeter/ I’m Not Gay But… EP, FRED Records
- 2006: SaltPeter/ Everybody Back To Mine EP, FRED Records
- 2006: Coldcut/ DVD, Ninja Tune Records
- 2005: SaltPeter/ SaltPervert EP, Saltpetre Records:
- 2005: Alabama 3 feat Salena Saliva/Boots, One Little Indian
- 2004: Going Down Swinging/ compilation/Australia, GDS
- 2003: SaltPervert/5AM/single re-mix, OXYD Records.
- 2003: Gargoyle Spoken Word CD/ compilation/USA, Gargoyle
- 2003: Perfecto Presents...Seb Fontaine/ compilation, Perfecto
- 2003: Flat Pack Antenna/ Resonance FM compilation, Resonance FM
- 2000: SS&PC/ Egg Yolk Planet Fried debut album, Saltpetre Records
- 1999: Saltpetre CD/Volume One, Saltpetre Records
- 1999: Coldcut/Let Us Replay/ Virginia Epitome, Ninja Tune Records (credited as Salena Saliva)
- 1997: Coldcut/Let Us Play/ Noah’s Toilet, Ninja Tune Records (credited as Salena Saliva)
