= Jason Forbes =

British actor, writer and comedian (born 1990)

- Born: 27 October 1990 (age 35); Bristol, England, United Kingdom
- Education: Queen Elizabeth's Hospital; Jesus College, Cambridge
- Occupations: Actor, writer, comedian
- Website: www.jasonforbes.co.uk

Jason Forbes (born 27 October 1990) is a British actor, writer, comedian, impressionist, and TV presenter. He is best known for the CITV series Horrible Science; The Mash Report on BBC Two; as PC Peasey in the Professor Branestawm television films on BBC One; and as a member of the award-winning sketch trio 'Daphne'.

Forbes is co-creator, star and writer of the BBC Radio 4 series, Daphne Sounds Expensive.

== Early life and education ==
Forbes was born in Bristol, England, and educated at Queen Elizabeth's Hospital in Clifton. He then went up to Jesus College, Cambridge, to read English, graduating in 2012.

At school he joined the 'Gabblers' Club' – a Bristol-based after-dinner speaking society for young students; and, in 2008, was awarded the Gabblers' prize for 'Best Speaker' – a prize formerly awarded to stand-up comedian Mark Watson.

At Cambridge University, Forbes wrote and performed in a number of comedy shows as a member of the famous Cambridge Footlights. In 2012, he co-wrote and performed in Perfect Strangers – the Footlights' 50th annual revue – touring the UK and the United States. He also performed in a number of 'serious plays', from contemporary to Shakespeare; and on London's West End as part of a showcase directed by former artistic director of the Royal Court Theatre, Max Stafford-Clark.

Prior to becoming a professional actor, Forbes worked as a marketing executive, civil servant, computer programmer, web designer, graphic designer and teacher of languages.

== Career ==
=== Comedy ===
In September 2014, Forbes reunited with his Cambridge Footlights contemporaries Phil Wang and George Fouracres to form the sketch group 'Daphne'.

The trio began hosting a comedy night called Nova Nova, every other month at the Cockpit Theatre, Marylebone, where they trialled their new material alongside guests, including British comedians Harry Hill and James Acaster.

Daphne went on to win the London Sketchfest's prize for 'Best New Act' in 2015. Their first Edinburgh Festival Fringe show, Daphne Do Edinburgh, was critically acclaimed and Daphne were nominated for the 2015 Foster's (formerly Perrier) Award for 'Best Newcomer'.

=== Radio ===
==== Daphne Sounds Expensive (BBC Radio 4) ====
In February 2016, the BBC announced that Daphne would be bringing a "Goon Show-esque" comedy called Daphne Sounds Expensive to BBC Radio 4, with the first episode airing on 14 July 2016. The series consists of four thirty-minute episodes.

Daphne Sounds Expensive was shortlisted for the 'Best Radio Sketch Show' award at the Comedy.co.uk Awards 2016. Radio 4 commissioned a second series which it would broadcast from 13 July 2017.

==== Other radio work ====
Forbes is a regular guest on the satirical sketch show Newsjack on BBC Radio 4 Extra.

In 2017, he appeared in the two-part BBC Radio 4 sitcom Life on Egg by Daniel Maier, alongside Harry Hill, Marek Larwood, and Gyles Brandreth.

=== Film and television ===
Forbes made his first TV appearance in 2013 in Kerry, a BBC Three Comedy Feeds episode by comedic actress Kerry Howard.

He later appeared in The Mimic on Channel 4 and Pompidou by Little Britain star Matt Lucas on BBC One.

In 2014, he appeared on BBC One alongside Harry Hill, David Mitchell, Ben Miller, Miranda Richardson, Simon Day and Charlie Higson, as PC Peasey in Higson's adaptation of The Incredible Adventures of Professor Branestawm by Norman Hunter.

In May 2015, ITV announced that Forbes would be among the cast of their new series Horrible Science, based on the Horrible Science books by Nick Arnold.

Forbes also joined the cast of Tracey Ullman's sketch show, Tracey Ullman's Show, for BBC One and HBO. He was a regular in the second series of Tracey Ullman's Show, and portrayed former American World No. 1 professional tennis player, Arthur Ashe, in the 2017 film Borg/McEnroe, starring Sverrir Guðnason and Shia LaBeouf.

In 2021, broadcaster UKTV announced that Forbes would be joining Kemah Bob and Tom Allen as co-host of a new panel show called The Island on its comedy channel Dave. The show was co-created by comedians John Robins, Lloyd Langford, Ed Gamble, and James Acaster. Recording of the first eight episodes began in June 2021.

In 2024, he starred in Netflix's science fiction television series, 3 Body Problem, as Omar Khayyam.

== Style and influences ==
Forbes is a lover of physical comedy and often incorporates slapstick humour into his routines. He has cited Laurel and Hardy, Charlie Chaplin, Rowan Atkinson, Sir Norman Wisdom and, "most of all", Michael Crawford among his physical influences. "Against all advice," says Forbes in an interview with online blog Comedy Blogedy, "I'd try everything they did at home: bumping into things, falling over, deliberately spilling stuff and – to my mother's horror – throwing myself down the stairs."

Forbes apparently perfected his stair-fall in a university production of Michael Frayn's Noises Off.

Of his sketch group Daphne's debut Edinburgh Festival Fringe show, The List magazine's Brian Donaldson remarked upon a "wild slapstick moment that will hopefully not result in an injury to Forbes before August is out."

== Credits ==
=== Film and television ===
Year	Title	Role	Notes
2013	Kerry	Various	TV pilot
2014	The Mimic	Spa worker	TV series (1 episode)
2014	The Incredible Adventures of Professor Branestawm	PC Peasey	TV film
2015	Pompidou	Ambulance Volunteer	TV series (1 episodes)
2015	BBC's Fresh from the Fringe	Various	As part of sketch trio, Daphne
2015	Professor Branestawm Returns	PC Peasey	TV film
2015–present	Horrible Science	Junior/Various	TV series (10 episodes)
2016	Tracey Ullman's Show	Various	
2016	The Windsors	Paramedic	TV series (1 episode)
2017	Borg/McEnroe	Arthur Ashe	Feature film
2017–2022	The Mash Report	Nathan Muir	TV series
2020	Spitting Image	Idris Elba/Lewis Hamilton	TV series
2024	A Gentleman in Moscow	Nachevko	TV series
2024	3 Body Problem	Omar Khayyam	TV series
2024	Renegade Nell	Court Clerk	TV series
2024	My Lady Jane	Scrope (2 episodes)	TV series

=== Radio ===
Year	Title	Role	Notes
2015	BBC Radio 4's Fresh from the Fringe	Various	As part of sketch trio, Daphne
2015–2017	Newsjack (BBC Radio 4 Extra)	Various	Series 13, Episode 4; Series 14, Episode 2; Series 15, Episode 5; Series 16, Episode 1
2016	Daphne Sounds Expensive (BBC Radio 4)	Creator / Writer / Performer	Radio series
2017	Life on Egg (BBC Radio 4)	Skulk / Tim / Nev / Doubleday	Radio sitcom
2017	Ankle Tag (BBC Radio 4)	Trevor / Chris	Series 1, Episode 1

=== Video games ===
Year	Title	Role
2022	Xenoblade Chronicles 3	Mwamba

== Awards and nominations ==
Forbes' sketch group Daphne were the winners of the London Sketchfest's prize for 'Best New Act' in 2015. Their first Edinburgh Festival Fringe show, Daphne Do Edinburgh, was critically acclaimed and Daphne were nominated for the 2015 Edinburgh Comedy Award for 'Best Newcomer'.
