= FoolishPeople =

British theatre and production collective

FoolishPeople seal

FoolishPeople is a British theatre and production collective specialising in original site-specific and immersive theatre, as well as independent film and books. The collective was founded in 1989 by John Harrigan, who developed the theatre practice Theatre of Manifestation. Combining ritual, mythology, shamanism, drama therapy, strategic forecasting and open source collaboration in the creation of FoolishPeople's work. Each project takes form by merging text, performance, sound, art, light and the building itself to create dreamlike worlds that living characters inhabit. FoolishPeople were one of the early pioneers of immersive theatre in the UK and have utilised transmedia within their work since their inception in 1989.

FoolishPeople consists of a core creative team which is enhanced by different actors and artists in various productions and projects. They have toured internationally, performing in the United States and the Netherlands, and have worked in partnership with the BBC, the Arcola Theatre, The Horse Hospital, the Institute of Contemporary Arts and Conway Hall Ethical Society, which is thought to be the oldest surviving freethought organisation in the world.

FoolishPeople launched their small press publisher Weaponized Imprint in 2010 and released their first feature film Strange Factories in October 2013.

== Founder ==
The founder and artistic director of FoolishPeople is John Harrigan, British film director, producer, screenwriter, actor and occultist. Harrigan also founded Weaponized Imprint.

Harrigan's work centres around the creation of film, ritual theatre and immersive events. He founded FoolishPeople in 1989, taking its name from The Fool Major Arcana of the tarot.

In January 2006, Harrigan was the first person to be presented with the "Magi of Trygonia" Award for FoolishPeople's Dark Nights of the Soul, Anthology of plays which were performed during a thirteen-month residency at The Horse Hospital, awarded by the Dionysian Underground.

Harrigan received the Best Director Award for his second feature film Armageddon Gospels at Brighton Rocks Film Festival in 2018.

To date, Harrigan is the writer and director of all FoolishPeople projects and productions. His scripts have been commissioned and presented at such venues as the Institute of Contemporary Arts, The Horse Hospital, the Arcola Theatre.

== Productions ==
=== Film ===
- 2021 Lightships - Feature Film - Writer and Director John Harrigan - in co-production with GHRL Ltd
- 2019 Armageddon Gospels - Feature Film - Writer and Director John Harrigan
- 2013 Strange Factories – Feature Film - Writer and Director John Harrigan

=== Theatre Productions ===
2018 The Lying Field - Writer and Director John Harrigan - 24–26 August 2018 Byline Festival, Pippingford Park, Nutley UK

2017 British Enough? - Writer and Director John Harrigan, in collaboration with artist and filmmaker Kristina Cranfeld, exploring the physical and imagined spaces conjured by Brexit in the borderlands of Britain’s future outside of the EU - 6–8 July 2017 BE FESTIVAL, Birmingham Repertory Theatre, Birmingham UK

2016 Borderland, Sex Angel - anthology of immersive theatre, episodical events at secret locations - Writer and Director John Harrigan

2015 The Woods Trapped at the Edge of Midnight - Writer and Director John Harrigan - 6–9 August 2015 Wilderness Festival, Cornbury Park, UK - Headlining Act - Theatre and Performance.

2014 Strange Factories: Remade - Writer and Director John Harrigan - 13 September 2014 Scalarama at the Curzon Community Cinema, Clevedon UK; 24 September 2014, Making Waves Film Festival at the Kings Theatre, Southsea Portsmouth UK; 17 October 2014, at the Ultimate Picture Palace Oxford UK; 1 November 2014 at the Magic Lantern Cinema in Tywyn UK.

2013 Strange Factories: The Imaginari - Writers John Harrigan and Craig Slee, Director John Harrigan - 26 October - 9 November 2013 at the Cinema Museum (London); 10 November 2013 at the Duke of York's Picture House, Brighton; 15–16 November 2013 with Sundown Cinema at Cadwell Farm, Hitchin and 18 November 2013 at Pavilion Dance, Bournemouth.

2012 Virulent Experience – Writer and Director John Harrigan - in partnership with Conway Hall Ethical Society

2010 The Basement - Ward 12 – Co-Writer and Director John Harrigan - in partnership with Secret Cinema

2010 The Providence Experiments – co-produced with Mythos Media

2010 A Red Threatening Sky – Writer and Director John Harrigan

2009 The Abattoir Pages – Writer and Director John Harrigan - presented with Guerilla Zoo

2009 Cirxus – Writer and Director John Harrigan

2008 Terra:Extremitas – Writer and Director John Harrigan

2007 Dead Language – Writer and Director John Harrigan

2007 Desecration – Writer and Director John Harrigan

2007 Weaponised Art 3.0 - Lazy Gramaphone - Writer and Director John Harrigan

2007 Terra-Incognita - Writer and Director John Harrigan - 491 Gallery

2007 Ghost Redux

2006 Dark Nights of the Soul: Cycle VI - Carousel - Writer and Director John Harrigan - The Horse Hospital

2006 Dark Nights of the Soul: Cycle V - Home - Writer and Director John Harrigan - The Horse Hospital

2006 Weaponised Art 2.0 - Guerrilla Zoo - Writer and Director John Harrigan - Corisca Studios

2006 Weaponised Art 1.0 - Guerrilla Zoo - Writer and Director John Harrigan - Corisca Studios

2006 Dark Nights of the Soul: Cycle IV - Congealed - Writer and Director John Harrigan - The Horse Hospital

2006 Dark Nights of the Soul: Cycle III - Emergence - Writer and Director John Harrigan - The Horse Hospital

2006 Dark Nights of the Soul: Cycle II - The Fluid Flesh - Writer and Director John Harrigan - The Horse Hospital

2005 Dark Nights of the Soul: Cycle I - The Wyrm Shroud - Writer and Director John Harrigan - The Horse Hospital

2005 Dr. Bleach - Writer and Director John Harrigan - Weird Weekend - Centre for Fortean Zoology

2004 Ruined Steel - Writer and Director John Harrigan - Camden People's Theatre

2004 Escape from RS1

2004 The Flesh List

2003 Past the Line, Between the Land - Writer John Harrigan - Camden People's Theatre

2002 The Singularity - Writer and Director John Harrigan - Camden People's Theatre

1994 Revelations; Fear The Mind - Writer and Director John Harrigan - North Herts College - Letchworth

1991 Enochian; Language of Angels - Writer and Director John Harrigan - North Herts College - Hitchin

=== Workshops and Talks ===
2016 Art Arcana - Art and talks, episodical events - hosted by Foolish People

2016 Ritual Art workshops - hosted by John Harrigan

=== Published books at Weaponized Imprint ===
2011 Citizen Y - John Harrigan with James Curcio

2011 The Immanence Of Myth - James Curcio, Stephane Griswold, Tony Thomas, Mr. VI, Rowan Tepper, MA, Yakov Rabinovich, Brian Corra, Stephen Hershey, Catherine Svehla, Ph.D, Bria, George, David Metcalfe, Michael Anthony Ricciardi, Damien Williams, Jason Kephas, Mica Gries, Tons May, David Mack, Rudy Rauben, S Jenx, David Aronson (with writing from Leslie Powell), John Harrigan, Laurie Lipton

2011 The End Of The Word As We Know It - Wes Unruh

2011 Forum - Richard Webb

2011 The Sparky Show - Xanadu Xero

2010 Dead Language - John Harrigan

2010 Cirxus - John Harrigan

== Awards ==
2018 Brighton Rocks Film Festival, Best Director - John Harrigan for Armageddon Gospels

2019 First Hermetic International Film Festival, Cagliostro Award - Best Storytelling - Armageddon Gospels - written by John Harrigan

== Interviews ==
2019 STARBURST Magazine Interview with John Harrigan on Armageddon Gospels

2016 Technoccult Interview with FoolishPeople Founder - John Harrigan

2013 Filmmaker Magazine: Out Of The Ashes - Strange Factories - by Nick Dawson

2013 Disinformation: Entering the Theatre of Manifestation – The Art of Possession - Interview with the core members of FoolishPeople by David Metcalfe

2013 The Eyeless Owl: Entering the Theatre of Manifestation – Unveiling the FoolishPeople - Interview with the core members of FoolishPeople by David Metcalfe

2013 New Intelligentsia Online Cinemas: Interview with John Harrigan by Cynthia DuVal "John Harrigan on Art, Strange Factories and Personal Transformation"

2011 Wired UK: Interview with John Harrigan "Strange Factories offers up 'subscription of experiences' to fan-funders" by Alice Vincent

2011 Blogtalkradio: Interview with John Harrigan, Founder of FoolishPeople by Nancy Wait

2008 Technoccult: Interview with John Harrigan of Foolish People by Klint Finley

2007 Culture Compass: Exclusive : John Harrigan Interview by Loma-Ann Marks
