= Coco Khan =

British writer

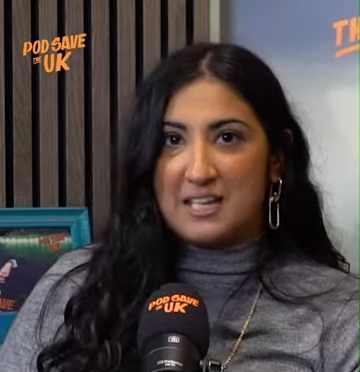
- Khan in 2023
- Born: 29 February 1988 (age 38); Barking, London, England
- Occupations: Writer, podcaster
- Known for: Pod Save The UK

Coco Khan (born 29 February 1988) is a British freelance writer, podcaster and presenter, based in London. Her work covers issues of social justice, housing and diversity. Since 2023, she has co-hosted the podcast Pod Save the UK with Nish Kumar, for which she won the UK Audio Network (UKAN) Award for Podcast Host of the Year.

== Early life and education ==
Khan was born in Barking and grew up in Dagenham, East London. She was born on 29 February in a leap year and calls herself a "leapling". Khan is of Punjabi heritage.

Khan attended Mayfield School and New City College. She graduated from the University of Warwick with a degree in English and American Literature.

== Journalism and writing ==
Khan has been a columnist and feature writer for the Guardian newspaper since 2016, and wrote a weekly article for several years. She was also the commissioning editor for Guardian B2B (Business to Business) and the editor of lifestyle magazine, the Kensington & Chelsea Review until 2017. She has contributed articles to The Independent, New York Magazine, the Huffington PostThe Voice and Dazed and Confused.

Khan contributed a chapter to the book The Good Immigrant, a book of essays by 21 Black and Asian writers about their experiences, published in 2016, edited by Nikesh Shukla. She later wrote about receiving a 'stream of apology emails' after the book's publication, from those she knew, apologising for their lack of understanding of how racism had impacted on her life. Her essay for the book "Flags" was recorded as a BBC Book of the Week, and broadcast in 2016.

== Podcasting and broadcasting ==
Khan is best known for co-hosting the British politics podcast Pod Save The UK with comedian Nish Kumar. Pod Save the UK, produced by Crooked Media, which also produces Pod Save America, began in May 2023. For her work on the podcast, Khan was awarded the inaugural Podcast Host of the Year award at the UK Audio Network (UKAN) Awards in 2024. Khan was also nominated for Best New Voice at the 2023 Audio Production Awards, while she and Kumar were nominated for Best Ensemble Cast at in 2023 and 2024. Pod Save the UK won the Podcast Champion Award at the 2025 British Podcast Awards.

She has appeared on radio shows such as the BBC Radio 4 show The News Quiz, and as a panelist on television shows such as Sunday with Laura Kuenssberg.
