= The Good Immigrant =

2016 anthology of essays by British writers

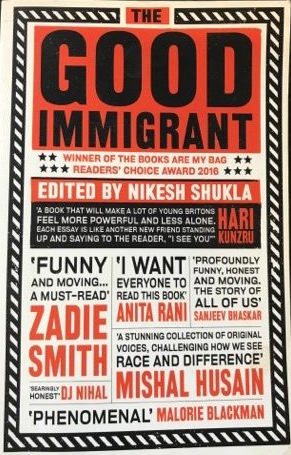
- Editor: Nikesh Shukla
- Language: English
- Subject: Migration, race, racial politics, identity, ethnicity, oppression
- Genre: Migrant Literature
- Publisher: Unbound, Penguin Books
- Publication date: 4 May 2017
- Publication place: United Kingdom
- English publication date: 22 September 2016
- Media type: Book
- Pages: 272
- ISBN: 9781783523955 UK paperback
- Followed by: The Good Immigrant USA
- Website: http://www.nikesh-shukla.com/the-good-immigrant

The Good Immigrant is an anthology of twenty-one essays edited by Nikesh Shukla and first published by Unbound in the UK in 2016 after a crowd-funding campaign endorsed by celebrities. Written by British authors who identify as BAME (Black, Asian and Minority Ethnic), the essays concern race, immigration, identity, 'otherness', exploring the experience of immigrant and ethnic minority life in the United Kingdom from their perspective. Contributors include actor/musician Riz Ahmed, journalist Reni Eddo-Lodge, comedian Nish Kumar and playwright Vinay Patel. The compilation inspired the American sequel The Good Immigrant USA, published in 2017, which featured BAME authors from the United States.

== Summary ==
The Good Immigrant is a book of 21 essays by BAME writers, described by Sandeep Parmar in The Guardian as "an unflinching dialogue about race and racism in the UK", which aims to "document… what it means to be a person of colour now" in light of what Shukla notes in the book's foreword "the backwards attitude to immigration and refugees [and] the systematic racism that runs through [Britain]". Written by twenty-one British authors of Black, Asian and Minority Ethnic (BAME) backgrounds, The Good Immigrant explores the personal and universal experiences of immigrant and ethnic minority life in the United Kingdom. Shukla's book tells stories of "anger, displacement, defensiveness, curiosity, absurdity" as well as "death, class, microaggression, popular culture, access, freedom of movement, stake in society, lingual fracas, masculinity, and more".

== Contributors ==
1. Nikesh Shukla: Namaste
2. Varaidzo: A Guide to Being Black
3. Chimene Suleyman: My Name is My Name
4. Vera Chok: Yellow
5. Daniel York Loh: Kendo Nagasaki and Me
6. Himesh Patel: Window of Opportunity
7. Nish Kumar: Is Nish Kumar a Confused Muslim?
8. Reni Eddo-Lodge: Forming Blackness Through a Screen
9. Wei Ming Kam: Beyond 'Good' Immigrants
10. Darren Chetty: You Can't Say That! Stories Have to Be About White People
11. Kieran Yates: On Going Home
12. Coco Khan: Flags
13. Inua Ellams: Cutting Through (On Black Barbershops and Masculinity)
14. Sabrina Mahfouz: Wearing Where You're At: Immigrant and U.K. Fashion
15. Riz Ahmed: Airports and Auditions
16. Sarah Sahim: Perpetuating Casteism
17. Salena Godden: Shade
18. Miss L: The Wife of a Terrorist
19. Bim Adewunmi: What We Talk About When We Talk About Tokenism
20. Vinay Patel: Death is a Many Headed Monster
21. Musa Okwonga: The Ungrateful Country

== Reception ==
David Barnett's review in British newspaper The Independent openly praised the political nature of the book, saying: "The stories are sometimes funny, sometimes brutal, always honest. If you find them shocking, it's probably because you're white, like me, and don't have to live with any of this every single day of the week. And for that reason, if I could, I'd push a copy of this through the letter box of every front door in Britain."

Similarly, another review written by Sandeep Parmar for The Guardian judged the book as "an unflinching dialogue about race and racism in the UK". continuing to say: "We should recognise both the courage that has been shown in producing these essays and the contradictions that necessarily exist across them. While, inevitably, some are better crafted and more convincing than others, The Good Immigrant helps to open up a much-needed space of open and unflinching dialogue about race and racism in the UK."

Arifa Akbar, writing in The Financial Times, thought that J. K. Rowling's involvement (and that of other cultural leaders) in fund raising for the collection contained "whisperings of white saviourism" but that despite that, "the book reads like an uncompromised work" that summarises "experiences of racism or racial pigeonholing".

The book reached the top-10 non-fiction charts in both UK and US editions and was number 1 on Amazon non-fiction in the UK for a short period.

It was voted the winner in the Books Are My Bag Readers' Awards.

Coco Khan's essay, Flags, was recorded as a BBC Book of the Week, and broadcast in 2016.

== Crowdfunding ==
In an interview at the Edinburgh Festival, Shukla stressed that the inception of this book was borne from "gatekeeping" within the publishing industry and a desire to see diverse opinions on bookshelves rather than just diversity panels. To achieve this, Shukla worked with Unbound, a British publishing house which utilises crowdfunding to enable the publication of "books readers want". In an interview with multi-national newspaper The Guardian, Unbound's co-founder John Mitchinson stated that crowdfunding means that "the handwringing that usually surrounds this issue is replaced by positive action on the part of both contributors and potential readers."

The Good Immigrant reached its funding target in just three days after receiving public support from the notable authors J.K. Rowling, David Nicholls, Jonathan Coe and Evie Wyld who were amongst the book's 470 supporters. Rowling has received a dedication in the book, after her public support of The Good Immigrant with a tweet which stated that it was "an important, timely read". Nicholls also publicly endorsed The Good Immigrant stating that "I did want to support the project because it's an important subject, and not something I know enough about."

== Sequel - The Good Immigrant USA (2019) ==
Following the success of The Good Immigrant, Nikesh Shukla and Chimene Suleyman solicited contributions from American minority writers, actors, comedians, directors, and artists. The Good Immigrant USA - 26 writers reflect on America was published by Dialogue Books in 2019 (ISBN 9780349700373), and includes the contributions of twenty-six Americans of colour.

=== Contributors ===
1. Porochista Khakpour How to Write Iranian-America, or The Last Essay
2. Nicole Dennis-Benn Swimmer
3. Rahawa Haile Sidra (in 12 Movements)
4. Teju Cole On the Blackness of the Panther
5. Priya Minhas How Not to Be
6. Walé Oyéjidé After Migration: The Once and Future Kings
7. Fatimah Asghar On Loneliness
8. Tejal Rao Chooey-Booey and Brown
9. Maeve Higgins Luck of the Irish
10. Krutika Mallikarjuna Her Name Was India
11. Jim St. Germain Shithole Nation
12. Jenny Zhang Blond Girls in Cheongsams
13. Chigozie Obioma The Naked Man
14. Alexander Chee Your Father's Country
15. Yann Demange The Long Answer
16. Jean Hannah Edelstein An American, Told
17. Chimene Suleyman On Being Kim Kardashian
18. Basim Usmani Tour Diary
19. Daniel José Older Dispatches from the Language Wars
20. Adrián Villar Rojas and Sebastián Villar Rojas Juana Azurduy Versus Christopher Columbus
21. Dani Fernandez (author) No Es Suficiente
22. Fatima Farheen Mirza Skittles
23. Susanne Ramírez de Arellano Return to Macondo
24. Mona Chalabi 244 Million
25. Jade Chang How to Center Your Own Story

== The Good Immigrant - The Netherlands (2020) ==
In The Netherlands, crowdfunding for a Dutch version of The Good Immigrant by podcast Dipsaus (Anousha Nzume, Ebissé Wakjira and Mariam El Maslouhi) was successfully finished in March 2020. The book itself, De goede immigrant - 23 visies op Nederland was published by Dipsaus and publisher Pluim in August 2020 (ISBN 9789462984141, editor-in-chief Sayonara Stutgard). The book was inspired by the original UK edition and isn't an official follow-up.

=== Contributors ===
1. Quinsy Gario
2. Manju Reijmer
3. Nina Köll
4. Clark Accord
5. Sarah Bekkali
6. Mojdeh Feili
7. Jeanette Chedda
8. Richard Kofi
9. Khadija Boujbira
10. Simone Zeefuik
11. Olave Nduwanje
12. Tirsa With
13. Dino Suhonic
14. Mia You
15. Hasret Emine
16. Zaïre Krieger
17. Deborah Cameron
18. Karwan Fatah-Black
19. Yael van der Wouden
20. Rita Ouédraogo
21. Zouhair Hammana
22. Nancy Jouwe
23. Fatima Faïd
