= Pod Save the UK =

British political podcast

- Genre: Political podcast Progressive talk radio
- Country of origin: United Kingdom
- Language: English

Cast and voices
- Hosted by: Nish Kumar; Coco Khan

Production
- Length: 32–77 minutes

Publication
- No. of episodes: 179
- Original release: 4 May 2023
- Provider: Crooked Media; Reduced Listening

Reception
- Ratings: 4.4/5

Related
- Related shows: Pod Save America; Pod Save the World
- Website: https://crooked.com/podcast-series/pod-save-the-uk/

Pod Save the UK is a weekly British political comedy podcast produced and distributed by Crooked Media, in partnership with Reduced Listening. A spin-off of the podcasts Pod Save America and Pod Save the World hosted by comedian Nish Kumar and journalist Coco Khan, each episode generally features a discussion into a current political issue in the United Kingdom, such as elections, party politics, republicanism and freedom of assembly, accompanied with an interview with one or two guests, usually experts and politicians.

Pod Save the UK is Crooked Media's first podcast to focus specifically on British politics, compared to its sister podcasts which focus heavily on domestic issues within the United States (Pod Save America) and global issues and international relations (Pod Save the World). It is the first podcast made by Crooked Media outside the US. Pod Save the UK premiered on 4 May 2023. Pod Save the UK has received a number of accolades, including the Podcast Champion Award at the 2025 British Podcast Awards.

== History ==
On 19 October 2022 at the IAB Podcast Upfronts, Crooked Media announced that it would be expanding internationally with a British podcast hosted by Nish Kumar, the former host of the political comedy show The Mash Report; the show was slated to premiere in early 2023. It was subsequently announced that Kumar would co-host the show with Coco Khan, a journalist for The Guardian. Kumar described Pod Save the UK as "a British political podcast but made by Americans... the tone is hopefully going to be justified optimism".

Ahead of the show's premiere, on 26 April 2023 a bonus episode was published featuring an interview between Kumar and Khan and Jon Favreau, Jon Lovett, and Tommy Vietor, the hosts of Pod Save America. Pod Save the UK officially premiered on 4 May 2023 with the episode "Raving for a Republic", featuring a discussion on republicanism in the United Kingdom with guests including Amelia Hadfield, professor of politics at the University of Surrey, and Clive Lewis, a Labour MP and anti-monarchy activist. Episodes of Pod Save the UK are released on Thursdays on a weekly basis.

== Reception ==
Writing in The Guardian, Miranda Sawyer described Pod Save the UK as less political than its American counterparts, citing Kumar and Khan's lack of insider political experience; she stated it made the podcast "more of a straightforwardly funny-but-serious leftwing political show". She praised Khan as being "quick-witted and well-informed", while criticising Kumar as being "just loud", though she felt that the second episode had made improvements over the premiere.

James Marriott in The Times was more positive, praising the "banterous energy" and the "refreshing" progressive viewpoint, concluding the premiere was an "impeccable debut".

Fiona Sturges in the Financial Times writes that unlike Pod Save America which brings the views of former political insiders, the UK version brings the perspective of "baffled outsiders." Sturges thinks this is a welcome addition to the podcast landscape in the UK which already has podcasts from Westminster insiders. She praises the balance between serious to funny as well as enjoys their chemistry and 'unruly energy'.
