= Strange Factories =

- Official Strange Factories film poster
- Directed by: John Harrigan
- Written by: John Harrigan
- Produced by: John Harrigan; Lucy Harrigan; Tereza Kamenicka
- Starring: John Harrigan; Annalisa Astarita; Rachael Blyth
- Cinematography: Yiannis Katsaris
- Edited by: Bettina Fung
- Music by: Stephen Baysted
- Production company: FoolishPeople
- Distributed by: FoolishPeople
- Release date: 26 October 2013
- Running time: 132 minutes
- Country: United Kingdom
- Language: English

Strange Factories is a 2013 British experimental horror film written, directed by John Harrigan and produced by the British immersive theatre and production collective FoolishPeople. The film is an example of interactive cinema, featuring a mixture of film and live performance. It centers on a writer, who travels through a mysterious landscape filled with cultists, hallucinatory visions, and a mysterious factory that emanates a strange humming sound.

== Plot ==
A tormented writer named Victor journeys through a mysterious, dream-like landscape in search of a group of performers from a theater that mysteriously burned down. As he continues through the landscape, he begins to uncover a bizarre cult under the hallucinatory influence of a nearby factory, and a sinister pact he once made with its owner. All the while he is tormented by visions and a strange humming sound that emanates from the factory.

== Location ==
The filming took place in Portsmouth, Hampshire, England, and in Prague in the Czech Republic.

== Cast ==
- John Harrigan as Victor
- Annalisa Astarita as Hettie
- Rachael Blyth as Emma
- Tereza Kamenicka as Lady Thayn
- David Monard as Sam
- Claire Louise Oliver as Jessica
- Lucy Harrigan as Rose
- Claire Tregellas as Jess
- Mark Postgate as Arlec
- Xanadu Xero as Marina

== Reception ==
Ain't It Cool News gave the film a positive review, writing, "Strange Factories may not be for the more literal-minded of horror fans. But fans of the theatrical side of performances, the technical side of writing, and the appreciators of the surreal and offbeat will find a lot of things to appreciate." Sarah Stewart from The Londonist praised the film's atmosphere, suspense, and innovative blending of celluloid and live-action performance. Rachel Simm from The Latest Brighton gave the film three out of five stars, praising the film's atmosphere, and suspense, calling it "eerie, unsettling and somewhat puzzling".
