= Daphne (comedy) =

British comedy trio

- Notable work: Daphne Sounds Expensive (BBC Radio 4)

Comedy career
- Years active: 2014–2017
- Medium: Theatre, radio, television
- Genres: Comedy, sketch comedy, dark comedy, slapstick, music hall, vaudeville
- Members: Phil Wang; George Fouracres; Jason Forbes

Daphne was a British comedy trio made up of comedians Jason Forbes, Phil Wang and George Fouracres, active from 2014 to 2017.

Together they are the creators, writers and stars of the BBC Radio 4 series Daphne Sounds Expensive.

== Background ==
Forbes, Wang and Fouracres met while studying at the University of Cambridge, where they were members of the famous Cambridge Footlights, co-writing and performing in the 50th annual Cambridge Footlights' Revue, which toured both the UK and the United States.

The group 'Daphne' officially formed in September 2014 when the trio began hosting a comedy night called Nova Nova, every other month at the Cockpit Theatre, Marylebone, in London, where they trialled their new material alongside guests, including British comedians Harry Hill and James Acaster.

Daphne went on to win the London Sketchfest's prize for 'Best New Act' in 2015. Their first Edinburgh Festival Fringe show, Daphne Do Edinburgh, was critically acclaimed and Daphne were nominated for the 2015 Foster's (formerly Perrier) Award for 'Best Newcomer'.

== Style and influences ==
In an interview with Comedy Blogedy, Daphne cited an eclectic range of figures who have had an influence on their style from many different genres, various eras and from several parts of the world. The group is heavily influenced by music hall and old vaudeville; and, in their "Goon Show-esque" BBC Radio 4 show, Daphne Sounds Expensive, they are accompanied by a live nine-piece band.

== Radio ==
=== Daphne Sounds Expensive (BBC Radio 4) ===
In February 2016, the BBC announced that Daphne would be bringing a "Goon Show-esque" comedy called Daphne Sounds Expensive to BBC Radio 4, with the first episode airing on 14 July 2016. The series consists of four thirty-minute episodes.

Daphne Sounds Expensive was shortlisted for the 'Best Radio Sketch Show' award at the Comedy.co.uk Awards 2016. Radio 4 commissioned a second series, which was broadcast from 13 July 2017.

== Awards and nominations ==
Daphne were the winners of London Sketchfest's prize for 'Best New Act' in 2015, and their debut Edinburgh Festival Fringe show, Daphne Do Edinburgh, was nominated for the 2015 Foster's (formerly Perrier) Award for 'Best Newcomer'.
