= Armageddon Gospels =

British film

- Film poster
- Directed by: John Harrigan
- Written by: John Harrigan
- Produced by: FoolishPeople; Lucy Harrigan; John Harrigan; Claire Tregellas; Tereza Kamenicka; Laurian Leggett
- Starring: Kate Alderton; Lucy Harrigan; Tereza Kamenicka
- Cinematography: Mark Caldwell
- Edited by: Paul Jenkinson
- Music by: Jo Burke
- Production company: FoolishPeople
- Distributed by: FoolishPeople
- Release date: 31 October 2019
- Running time: 95 minutes
- Country: United Kingdom
- Language: English

Armageddon Gospels is a 2019 British folk horror film written, produced and, directed by John Harrigan and produced by the British immersive theatre and production collective FoolishPeople. The film premiered at the 2018 Byline Fest and was released on the 31 October 2019.

== Premise ==
Refugee gods, transposed to flesh and blood, wash ashore to rouse the myths of ancient England, half-drowned in a forgotten past. They disperse through shifting realities to awaken the giant Albion and find the holy grail in a ritual to save England from the rot of darkness and hatred that's strangling its soul.

== Cast ==
- Kate Alderton as Aradia
- Milo Cradick as Cunning Murrell
- Ethan-James Harrigan as Young Robin
- Finn Harrigan as Robin
- John Harrigan as Hare / Fisher King
- Lucy Harrigan as Dianna
- Tereza Kamenicka as Sophia
- Sabrina Rodríguez as Epona
- Victoria Karlsson as MT
- Scott Temple as Percy
- Claire Tregellas as Pearl
- Laura Wolfe as May Queen / Betty

== Reception ==
Martin Unsworth of Starburst Magazine awarded the film seven out of ten stars, writing, "Perhaps not as accessible as other folk horror tales, Armageddon Gospels is a worthy and well-made movie that rises above its humble budget and will no doubt develop a cult following with alternative groups."

== Awards ==
- Brighton Rocks Film Festival 2018, Best Director Award - John Harrigan
- First Hermetic International Film Festival 2019, Italy, Cagliostro Award - Best Storytelling
