= Daphne Sounds Expensive =

British radio series

- Running time: 30 minutes
- Country of origin: United Kingdom
- Language: English
- Home station: BBC Radio 4
- Starring: Jason Forbes; Phil Wang; George Fouracres; Sir Willard White; Emma Sidi; David Elms; Liam Williams; Jack Kirwan; Celeste Dring; Caitlin Moran; Elizabeth Tan; Lewis MacLeod; Will Seaward
- Created by: Jason Forbes; Phil Wang; George Fouracres
- Written by: Jason Forbes; Phil Wang; George Fouracres
- Produced by: Matt Stronge
- Recording studio: BBC Broadcasting House
- Original release: 14 July 2016
- No. of series: 2
- No. of episodes: 8
- Audio format: Stereo
- Website: BBC Programmes page

Daphne Sounds Expensive is a BBC Radio 4 comedy series, written and performed by the sketch comedy trio 'Daphne' (Jason Forbes, Phil Wang and George Fouracres).

Daphne Sounds Expensive was shortlisted for the 'Best Radio Sketch Show' award at the Comedy.co.uk Awards 2016. Radio 4 commissioned a second series which it would broadcast from 13 July 2017.

== Background ==
Jason Forbes, Phil Wang and George Fouracres came together to form the sketch group Daphne in 2014. Daphne went on to win the London Sketchfest's prize for 'Best New Act' in 2015. Their debut Edinburgh Festival Fringe show, Daphne Do Edinburgh, was critically acclaimed and the group was nominated for the 2015 Foster's (formerly Perrier) Award.

In February 2016, the BBC announced that Daphne would be bringing a "Goon Show-esque" comedy to BBC Radio 4.

The show was recorded in front of a live audience at BBC Broadcasting House.

== Overview ==
In addition to Daphne (Jason Forbes, Phil Wang and George Fouracres), the cast of Daphne Sounds Expensive includes guest stars such as: opera singer Sir Willard White – a series regular; actors Elizabeth Tan and Lewis MacLeod; and author Caitlin Moran.

It also features original music composed by Jeff Carpenter and Pippa Cleary, and a live nine-piece band from the London Musical Theatre Orchestra.

The show's producer, Matt Stronge, is the grandson of Goon Show writer and comedian Eric Sykes.

== List of episodes ==
=== Series 1 ===
No.	Title	Written by	Produced by	Original release date
1	"Malaysia"	Jason Forbes, Phil Wang & George Fouracres	Matt Stronge	14 July 2016
The gang heads off to Malaysia to find Phil's legendary criminal uncle, Pak Belang. Guest stars: Sir Willard White, Emma Sidi & David Elms.
2	"Pirates"	Jason Forbes, Phil Wang & George Fouracres	Matt Stronge	21 July 2016
The gang set sail for New York but are waylaid by George's mathematical ineptitude. Guest stars: Sir Willard White, Emma Sidi & David Elms.
3	"D.A.P.H.N.E."	Jason Forbes, Phil Wang & George Fouracres	Matt Stronge	28 July 2016
Jason has an out-of-this-world plan to increase the show's listenership. Guest stars: Sir Willard White, Emma Sidi & David Elms.
4	"Murder"	Jason Forbes, Phil Wang & George Fouracres	Matt Stronge	4 August 2016
In this last episode of the series, the gang must solve a mysterious murder on the Yorkshire Moors. Guest stars: Sir Willard White, David Elms & Liam Williams.

=== Series 2 ===
No.	Title	Written by	Produced by	Original release date
1	"Black Country"	Jason Forbes, Phil Wang & George Fouracres	Matt Stronge	13 July 2017
The Daphne boys host a charity gala night in George's native Wolverhampton, where guests include award-winning author Caitlin Moran. All seems to be going swimmingly before George makes a shocking confession. Guest stars: Sir Willard White, Jack Kirwan, Celeste Dring & Caitlin Moran.
2	"Time Travel"	Jason Forbes, Phil Wang & George Fouracres	Matt Stronge	20 July 2017
After Phil blows a fortune on a spanking new time machine, the Daphne boys must use it to embark on a treacherous adventure in a desperate attempt to recoup their losses. Guest stars: Sir Willard White, Elizabeth Tan & Lewis MacLeod.
3	"Atlantis"	Jason Forbes, Phil Wang & George Fouracres	Matt Stronge	27 July 2017
World-renowned opera singer Sir Willard White has an ingenious plan to solve the boys' money woes. They must travel to the lost city of Atlantis in pursuit of a legendary precious metal. Guest stars: Sir Willard White, Will Seaward & Celeste Dring.
4	"Horror"	Jason Forbes, Phil Wang & George Fouracres	Matt Stronge	3 August 2017
Thwarting Jason's plans to make a horror episode, Phil and George hope to appease the Twitter trolls by keeping the show nice and family friendly – all with the help of Sir Paul McCartney.
