= The Short Life of José Antonio Gutierrez =

- Directed by: Heidi Specogna
- Distributed by: Atopia (Canada-US)
- Release date: 2006
- Running time: 90 minutes
- Countries: Switzerland; Germany
- Language: German

The Short Life of José Antonio Gutierrez (Das kurze Leben des José Antonio Gutierrez) is a 2006 documentary film directed by Heidi Specogna about the second US Marine to die during the 2003 invasion of Iraq (Lt. Shane Childers was the first American to die in the Iraq war). Gutiérrez came from Guatemala and was a so-called 'green card soldier' i.e. he obtained American citizenship only after his death. He was killed by friendly fire.

The film tells his childhood by interviewing people who had known him. Gutierrez had lived as a street child, like many other Guatemalan children who had lost their parents during a genocidal civil war in which the CIA and the KGB were actively involved. Later he found refuge in an orphanage and was able to find his sister.

When he grew up Gutierrez decided to go to the United States because he wanted to become an architect. He was a talented draftsman and saw no possibility of realizing his dream in his home country. The film accompanies young women who, despite the risks of which they are aware, take the freight train as Gutierrez had done. In the USA Gutierrez was able to attend high school because he looked younger than he was. Because he was considered to be a minor he could not be deported. He received a green card.

After high school he became a Marine which surprised some of those who had known him because he had refused to speak English and was proud of being a Guatemalan. It seems Gutierrez saw no other way to fulfil his aspiration than to risk his life for a country which he didn't consider his own.

After his death Gutierrez' sister was informed by the American ambassador. She was offered a visa to the USA which she accepted.

Although the film concentrates on Gutierrez and Guatemala it can, like other recent films (e.g. Darwin's Nightmare), also be seen as an allegory on globalization.

== Awards ==
The Short Life of José Antonio Gutierrez received the 2007 prize for "Best Documentary" in the Swiss Film Prize, alongside the also-nominated Hippie Masala, Das Erbe der Bergler, Ein Lied für Argyris and La liste de Carla.

== See also ==
- Political Cinema
- Hispanics in the United States Marine Corps
