= José Antonio Gutiérrez =

U.S. Marine lance corporal

- Born: 1 December 1980; Guatemala City, Guatemala
- Died: 21 March 2003 (aged 22); Umm Qasr, Iraq
- Military career
- Allegiance: United States
- Branch: United States Marine Corps
- Rank: Lance corporal
- Units: 1st Marine Division; 2nd Battalion, 1st Marines
- Conflicts: Iraq War; 2003 invasion of Iraq; Battle of Umm Qasr †

José Antonio Gutiérrez (1 December 1980 – 21 March 2003) was a United States Marine and the first Coalition soldier killed in action in the Iraq War.

== Early life and education ==
Born in Guatemala City, Guatemala, Gutiérrez and his sister were orphaned in Guatemala City in the mid-1980s. He was taken into the Casa Alianza residential care program, where he also attended school, earning high marks. By 1992 he had joined his sister Engracia with a family in Chinautla, Guatemala. In 1997 Gutiérrez crossed illegally into the United States, was detained by the Immigration and Naturalization Service, then received asylum and was placed with a foster family in Lomita, California. He entered high school and then completed college over the next few years.

== Career ==
Gutiérrez joined the Marine Corps on March 25, 2002. After recruit training, he was assigned to 2nd Battalion, 1st Marine Regiment, 1st Marine Division. The Division was dispatched to the Middle East, and the 2nd Battalion was attached to the 15th Marine Expeditionary Unit for the opening ground offensive of the Iraq War – the Battle of Umm Qasr. In the opening of the Battle, on March 21, 2003, Gutiérrez became the first U.S. Marine killed in action. He was killed by friendly fire. His body was evacuated through the British Army medical chain before being returned to Guatemala City for burial.

== Legacy ==
His life and death are the basis for the documentary film The Short Life of José Antonio Gutiérrez.

David Emanuel Hickman, of the U.S. Army's 82nd Airborne Division, was the last U.S. soldier killed in the Iraq War. He died on November 14, 2011, eight years and eight months after Gutiérrez was killed.
