= Nish Kumar =

British stand-up comedian and presenter (born 1985)

- Kumar in 2026
- Born: Nishant Kumar; 26 August 1985 (age 41); London, England
- Education: Durham University (BA)
- Occupation: Comedian
- Years active: 2004–present
- Known for: Gentlemen of Leisure; Newsjack; The Bugle; The Mash Report
- Partner: Amy Annette
- Website: nishkumar.co.uk

Nishant Kumar (born 1985) is a British stand-up comedian, television presenter and podcaster. He became known as the host of The Mash Report on BBC Two and Dave. He has also presented Newsjack on BBC Radio 4 Extra, Joel & Nish vs The World on Comedy Central, The News Quiz on BBC Radio 4 and Hello America on Quibi. Since May 2023, he has been the co-host of the political podcast Pod Save the UK.

== Early life and education ==
Kumar was born in Tooting in 1985 and raised in Croydon, south London. He attended St Olave's Grammar School in Orpington before reading English with history at Durham University as a member of Grey College. He is of Indian descent: his parents are from Kerala. His father chose the surname Kumar for the family when he immigrated to the UK, despite the name being more common in North India than South.

== Career ==
Kumar performing for an audience of children in 2014

Kumar performed with Tom Neenan as a double act, Gentlemen of Leisure, having met while students at the Durham University and performed in the Durham Revue.

Kumar has been performing as a solo stand-up performer in shows since 2013. He also held a regular guest spot on Josh Widdicombe's Radio X show between 2013 and 2015, where he presented the feature "Nishipedia".

Kumar has also taken part in a number of topical news programmes:

- In February 2015, he was announced as the host for the twelfth series of the BBC Radio 4 Extra series Newsjack.
- He has been a regular co-host of The Bugle podcast since October 2016.
- His series Spotlight Tonight with Nish Kumar first aired on BBC Radio 4 in March 2017.
- He was a guest on the BBC comedy show Frankie Boyle's New World Order in June 2017
- In 2020, he hosted the first of 3 series of The News Quiz, with Angela Barnes and Andy Zaltzman hosting the other two series. Since then, Zaltzman became the permanent host, therefore replacing Miles Jupp.

He has performed solo Edinburgh shows since 2012:

- 2012: 'Who Is Nish Kumar?'
- 2013: 'Nish Kumar Is a Comedian'
- 2014: "Ruminations on the Nature of Subjectivity".
- 2015: "Long word... Long word... Blah Blah Blah... I'm so clever" at The Pleasance Theatre, which continued as a UK tour running from October to December 2015. The show was nominated for an Edinburgh Comedy Award.
- 2016: "Actions Speak Louder Than Words, Unless You Shout the Words Real Loud", which received a number of favourable reviews. A joke from the show was featured in The Daily Telegraph's list of the 37 funniest jokes from the Edinburgh Fringe. This show continued as a national tour.

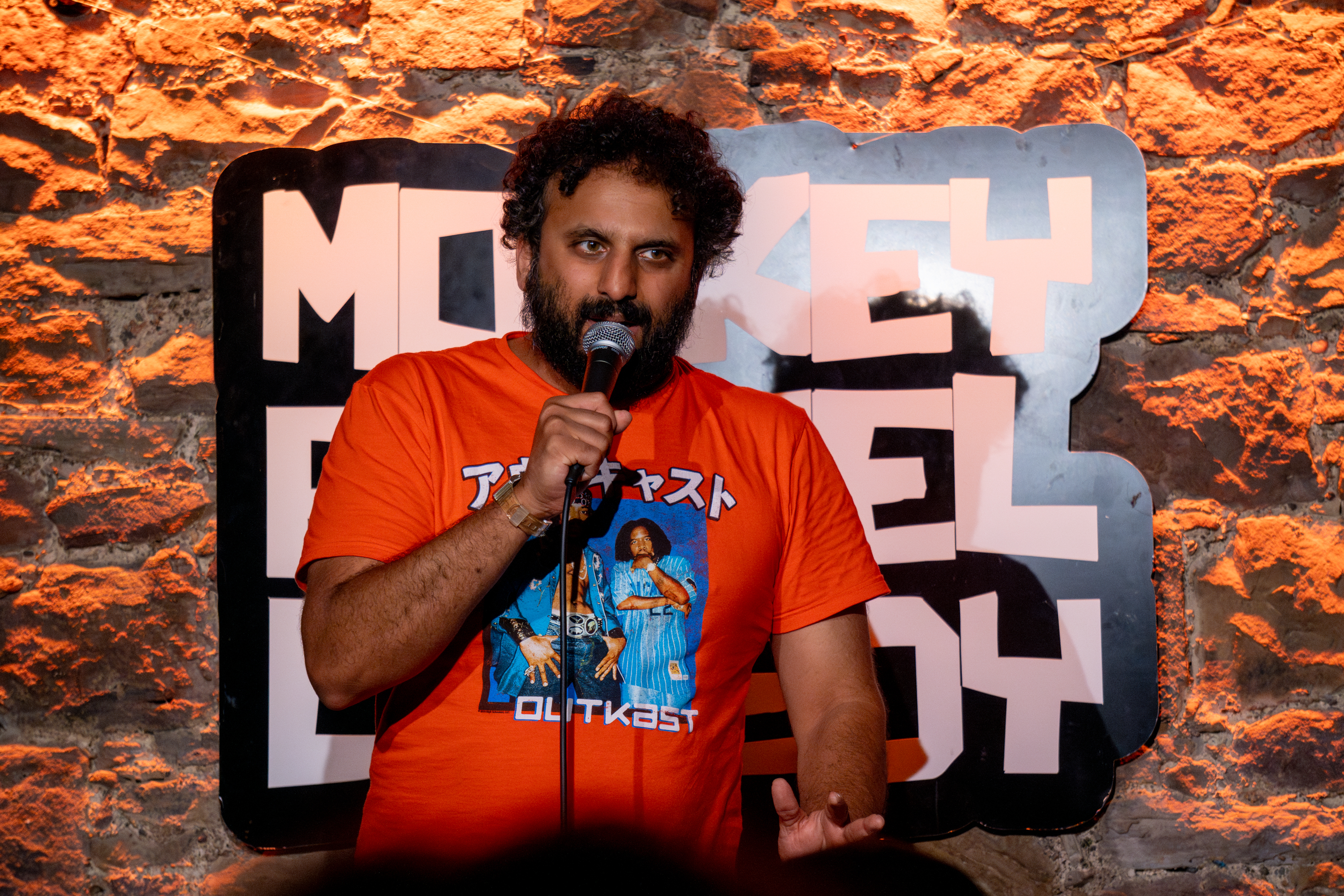
Nish Kumar at the 2024 Edinburgh Festival Fringe in Edinburgh, Scotland.

As a live performer, Kumar has appeared at a number of festivals and events, including the Melbourne International Comedy Festival, New Zealand Comedy Festival, Leicester Comedy Festival, the comedy tent at Latitude Music Festival and the Croydon Comedy Festival. In 2017, he competed in series 5 of Taskmaster with Bob Mortimer, Sally Phillips, Aisling Bea and Mark Watson. The same year, Kumar completed a six-part travel series for Netflix with fellow comedian Joel Dommett, titled Joel & Nish vs The World. In 2018 he appeared on Netflix's Comedians of the World.

He has also appeared as a guest on Have I Got News for You, Mock the Week, Virtually Famous, 8 Out of 10 Cats, Alan Davies: As Yet Untitled, Hypothetical, The Big Fat Quiz, Russell Howard's Stand Up Central, Sweat the Small Stuff, QI, Live from the BBC and The Alternative Comedy Experience.

In February 2019, it was announced he would be appearing in a new Sky One sport show, Comedians Watching Football With Friends.

In December 2019, Kumar was booed off stage at a Christmas charity lunch event for the Lord's Taverners. The performance, for which Kumar was not paid, included political jokes on Boris Johnson, Jacob Rees-Mogg, Theresa May and the ongoing Brexit process. Following the event, the Lord's Taverners released a statement emphasising the apolitical nature of the organisation and expressing that they did not support the behaviour of some members of the crowd, which included booing, heckling and the throwing of a bread roll. In response to the event, Kumar told The Guardian: "I'm sort of amazed by how fascinated people are by the whole thing. It's not the first time I've been booed off stage [...] I consider it the life of being a comedian – they have a right to boo me."

Kumar hosted the Quibi topical comedy series Hello America, which ran from August 2020 until the channel's closure in December that year.

Kumar hosted the topical BBC comedy show The Mash Report from its launch in 2017 until its cancellation in 2021. It was speculated that the series was dropped due to its perceived left-leaning political position, although the BBC made no official statement on this. Kumar expressed frustration over the lack of clarity, saying "They need to make a definitive statement that it was not a political decision. Because what precedent does that set otherwise?" Rights to the show were picked up by the television channel Dave, who began broadcasting new episodes as Late Night Mash, with Kumar and the main cast returning, in September 2021. In October 2021, Kumar revealed that he was stepping down from Mash after five seasons, four on the BBC and one on Dave

In May 2023, Kumar debuted as the co-host of Crooked Media's Pod Save the UK with Coco Khan, a spin-off of Pod Save America focusing on British politics.

== Personal life ==
Kumar is in a relationship with fellow comedian Amy Annette, whom he met in 2010. He was raised, and still identifies, as a Hindu.

Media offices
Preceded by In commission Last held by Miles Jupp	Host of The News Quiz; 2020	Succeeded by Angela Barnes
