= Chimene Suleyman =

Writer

Chimene or Chimène Suleyman is an English writer. She has written on the politics of race and immigration in media including The Guardian, The Independent, the BBC and NPR, and co-edited The Good Immigrant USA in 2019.

== Personal life ==
Suleyman was born at St Mary's Hospital in Paddington and grew up in North London. Her father's family are from the north of Cyprus. She has written about her grandfather's death in 1964, when he was tortured and killed by Greek soldiers in Cyprus, and his (Suleyman Recep) body, with a dozen others, seen in a much-reproduced photograph.

== Career ==
Suleyman created the monthly spoken-word event "Kid, I Wrote Back" in London, which ran from 2010 until at least 2013.

In 2014, the writer Laura Bates chose Suleyman's poetry collection Outside Looking On as one of her "best books" of the year, saying that it "presents startlingly perceptive snapshots of human experience, delving powerfully into themes that range from big-city loneliness and longing, to prejudice and love".

In 2017, Suleyman was a contributor to the crowdfunded publication The Good Immigrant, and in 2019 contributed to and co-edited its sequel, The Good Immigrant USA.

In 2021, Suleyman was involved in a controversy on social media as a result of raising concerns about depictions of autism and of students of colour in Kate Clanchy's book Some Kids I Taught and What They Taught Me.

In 2023, it was announced that Weidenfeld & Nicolson would publish Suleyman's memoir, The Chain, in 2024.

== Selected publications ==
- Suleyman, Chimene (2014). Outside Looking On. London: Influx. ISBN 9780992765552.
- Suleyman, Chimene (2017). "My Name is My Name". In Shukla, Nikesh (ed.). The Good Immigrant. London: Unbound. ISBN 9781783522965.
- Suleyman, Chimene (2019). "On Being Kim Kardashian". In Shukla, Nikesh; Suleyman, Chimene (eds.). The Good Immigrant USA: 26 writers reflect on America. London. ISBN 9780349700366.
- Suleyman, Chimene (2024). The Chain. London: W&N. ISBN 9781399606462.
