= Musa Okwonga =

British author (born 1979)

- Born: 11 October 1979 (age 46); London, United Kingdom
- Education: Eton College
- Alma mater: St John's College, Oxford (BA)
- Occupations: Author, podcaster
- Writing career
- Language: English

Musa Okwonga (born 11 October 1979) is a British author, podcaster, and musician. He was elected a Fellow of the Royal Society of Literature in 2022.

== Early life and education ==
Okwonga's parents, medical students, fled Uganda under Idi Amin's dictatorship and settled in the UK. He is the eldest of four children who were all brought up by their mother after their father died. Okwonga's father was killed aged 40 in a helicopter crash. His mother worked as a doctor.

Between 1993 and 1998, Okwonga attended Eton College, where he received a scholarship towards his fees. In 1998, he matriculated at St John's College, Oxford, reading Jurisprudence for three years.

Okwonga has also worked as a football journalist and the co-host of Stadio, a football podcast on The Ringer podcast network, Stadio. Since 2014, he has resided in Berlin, Germany.

== Publications ==
- One of Them: An Eton College Memoir, Unbound, 2021, ISBN 9781783529681
- In The End, It Was All About Love, Rough Trade Books, 2021, ISBN 9781912722976
- Raheem Sterling (Football Legends #1), Scholastic, 2020, ISBN 9781407198422
- "The Ungrateful Country", in The Good Immigrant (ed. Nikesh Shukla), 2016, ISBN 9781783523955
- Will You Manage? The Necessary Skills to Be a Great Gaffer, Serpent's Tail, 2010, ISBN 9781846687242
- A Cultured Left Foot, Duckworth overlook, 2007, ISBN 9780715637630
