= North Hertfordshire College =

Coordinates: 51.897°N 0.200°W

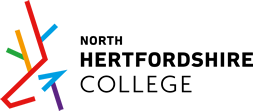
- Stevenage, Hitchin,, Hertfordshire; England

Information
- Type: College of further education
- Established: 1991 (by amalgamation)
- Ofsted: Reports
- Principal and Chief executive: Kit Davies
- Gender: Mixed
- Age: 16+
- Enrolment: 10,500
- Website: http://www.nhc.ac.uk

North Hertfordshire College ("NHC") is a further education and higher education college operating in Stevenage, Hitchin, and Letchworth Garden City. NHC was established on 1 April 1991, through the amalgamation of Stevenage College, Hitchin College and Letchworth Technical College. NHC is graded 'Good with Outstanding features' by Ofsted.

== History ==
The college was established on 1 April 1991 when further education, in Hertfordshire, was reorganised. One of the institutions merged into the new college was Hitchin College of Further Education.

== Campuses and Facilities ==
The college has two campuses in Stevenage, one in Hitchin, and an administrative centre in Letchworth Garden City.

=== Stevenage Centre ===
Her Majesty Queen Elizabeth II opened the Stevenage Centre in 2003. This centre is the largest campus; subjects taught there are childcare, General Certificate of Secondary Education subjects, Higher Education, health and social care, including science.

=== Engineering and Construction Campus ===
The Engineering and Construction Campus offers courses in carpentry, plumbing, electrical course offer, brickwork, engineering, and painting including decorating. In 2011, the centre expanded with a new welding training centre which was opened by Skills Minister, Matthew Hancock.

=== Hitchin Centre ===
The Hitchin Centre offers courses in business, tourism and events, hair and beauty, catering, sport, public services as well as creative arts. In 2012 to 2014, the centre was redeveloped.

==== The Retreat ====
The Retreat, based at the Hitchin Centre, offers hairdressing and beauty therapy services. The salon is staffed by qualified and learning students.

==== Sports Centre ====
The Sports Centre offers sport and fitness facilities to students and the public, including basketball courts, fitness studios, dance studios, a gym, and an all weather 3G football pitch.

==== The Meadows ====
The Meadows is a student-run restaurant. Under the direction of a head chef, students design menus as well as prepare and serve food and drinks to customers, including a lunch menu as well as theme evenings throughout the year.

== Airbus Foundation Discovery Space ==
In January 2017, NHC and Airbus opened a Science, Technology, Engineering, and Mathematics education centre, the Airbus Foundation Discovery Space, which is backed and funded by the Airbus Foundation and the Hertfordshire LEP. The centre was opened by astronaut Tim Peake.

== Grading ==
The college has been accredited with Investors in People Gold Award in 2012 and 2014.

In November 2017, NHC underwent an Ofsted inspection and received a Grade 2 (Good) for overall effectiveness of the provision. The effectiveness of the college's higher needs provision and traineeship were graded as Outstanding.

== Notable alumni ==
NHC alumni include:

- Ed Westwick, actor
- George Boyd, footballer
