= The Mash Report =

Television series

- Also known as: Late Night Mash
- Presented by: Nish Kumar (2017–2021); Rachel Parris (2022)
- Starring: Ellie Taylor; Steve N Allen; Freya Parker; Tom Bell; Jason Forbes; Greig Johnson; Geoff Norcott; Ahir Shah; Desiree Burch; Catherine Bohart; Pierre Novellie; Stevie Martin
- Country of origin: United Kingdom
- Original language: English
- No. of series: 6
- No. of episodes: 45

Production
- Producer: Chris Stott
- Running time: 30 minutes (2017–2020); 60 minutes (inc. adverts) (2021–2022)
- Production company: Zeppotron

Original release
- Network: BBC Two
- Release: 20 July 2017 – 8 May 2020
- Network: Dave
- Release: 2 September 2021 – 27 October 2022

The Mash Report is a British satirical comedy show originally broadcast on BBC Two and hosted by Nish Kumar. It features an array of comedians satirising the week's news. The show later continued on Dave as Late Night Mash, hosted by Kumar and then by Rachel Parris. It was cancelled in 2023.

The show debuted on 20 July 2017 and was a spin-off of The Daily Mash, a satirical website.

== History ==
In March 2017, the BBC announced it had commissioned The Mash Report, a new satirical news show hosted by Nish Kumar. It also stars Ellie Taylor and Steve N Allen as newsreaders Susan Treharne and Tom Logan, who read the satirical headlines, featuring correspondents Nathan Muir (Jason Forbes) and Prof. Henry Brubaker (Greig Johnson). Rachel Parris explains news stories with a humorous twist, and Geoff Norcott, a Conservative comedian, also features regularly.

In March 2021, the BBC cancelled the series "in order to make room for new comedy shows". On 28 July 2021, Dave announced a new eight-part series called Late-Night Mash would air in autumn of that year, with the main cast of The Mash Report returning in what Dave called a "continuation" of the BBC series. It began airing on 2 September.

On 28 October 2021, Nish Kumar revealed he was stepping down as the host of Late Night Mash. On 20 May 2022, it was announced that Rachel Parris would take over from him as the show's new host. The sixth series premiered on 1 September 2022. On 10 March 2023, Dave announced it had cancelled the series.

== Ratings ==
The first episode attracted an audience of 800,000, which was 20% less than usual for its timeslot. In February 2018, the British Comedy Guide said the show had been recommissioned for a third series after "modest" ratings on television, but was more popular on the BBC iPlayer and some clips had gone viral to a global audience online.

== Episodes ==
Series	Episodes		Originally released	
Series	Episodes		First released	Last released
1	10	4	20 July 2017	10 August 2017
1	10	6	18 January 2018	22 February 2018
2	6		26 October 2018	7 December 2018
3	6		5 September 2019	10 October 2019
4	6		3 April 2020	8 May 2020
5	9		2 September 2021	28 October 2021
6	8		1 September 2022	27 October 2022

== Reception ==
Reviewing it in 2017, Chortle regarded The Mash Report as a successful UK version of The Onion.

In July 2017, Michael Hogan of The Daily Telegraph gave The Mash Report four stars out of five and wrote, "People are fond of trotting out clichés about current world events being 'beyond parody' and 'the jokes writing themselves'. But no, parody still has a place and jokes do need to be written. This sharp new show did it rather well and was the most promising satirical arrival on our screens in a long time." In November 2018, the BBC's political presenter Andrew Neil described The Mash Report on Twitter as "self-satisfied, self-adulatory, unchallenged left-wing propaganda". Responding to a tweet about Geoff Norcott's appearances, he said it was "hardly balance" and would "never happen on a politics show". Neil characterised the series as a "pathetic imitation" of The Daily Show in the United States, describing the latter's former host Jon Stewart as "left-wing but also intelligent".

Writing in 2021 after its relaunch as Late-Night Mash, Emily Baker of the i newspaper disagreed with both the accusations of bias against the series and the show's self-styling as anti-establishment, saying that "the content of the show is no different from anything you'd hear on Radio 4's News Quiz (which has been hosted by Kumar on multiple occasions)... Late-Night Mash certainly isn't centrist, but it's no more left- or right-wing than Have I Got News For You".

== See also ==
- The Day Today
- List of satirical television news programs
