= Horrible Science =

Book series by Nick Arnold

- Front cover of Measly Medicine
- Author: Nick Arnold; Phil Gates
- Illustrator: Tony De Saulles
- Cover artist: De Saulles
- Subject: Science
- Genre: Children's literature; science writing
- Publisher: Scholastic
- Publication date: 1996–present
- Publication place: United Kingdom

Horrible Science is a series of books written by Nick Arnold and Phil Gates and illustrated by Tony de Saulles that are designed to get children interested in science by concentrating on the trivial, unusual, gory, or unpleasant. The books are in circulation in 24 countries, with over 4 million books having been sold in the UK.

Arnold released a paper entitled "Teaching Science the Horrible Way", in which he demonstrates the reasons why the Horrible Science series has a positive contribution to learning. According to Arnold, Horrible Science books are based on everyday topics and key areas of the curriculum. The range of approaches used in Horrible Science books are intended to emphasise the drama and excitement and wonder of science. Science words and concepts are introduced gradually, often using humour or fact files. Although mathematics is not needed at the level of science covered in the books, some activities require calculators. The books contain experiments under the heading "Dare you discover...". Several of the books end with thoughts on how science will shape the future.

== History ==
Before writing the series, Arnold was at the University of North London working on an educational project. He explained to The Birmingham Post: "It was actually a lucky break or a well-placed letter – whichever you want to believe – Because I wrote this really cheeky letter to the publishers Scholastic saying that if they were looking for someone to write a horrible science book I was the one. And would you believe they actually let me write a science book and put lots of horrible bits in it – and then it was hugely successful”.

During the mid-2010s, Horrible Science was given a book makeover, altering the covers of some of their old books, and all of the new books being published to have a new, more colorful background and updated information.

A Horrible Science theatre show produced by the Birmingham Stage Company, which also brought Horrible Histories to the stage, was created in 2013.

== Approach ==
Arnold explained his approach towards writing the series in an interview with The Birmingham Post: "My approach to a subject is to vastly over-research it. I have become quite good at science by writing these books so have got quite a lot of knowledge already but then I really like finding out more information. If I over-research then I don’t just have all the facts I need, I have a lot more – and that means I can really choose what I want to include. The thing about a Horrible Science book is that actually it is all about imagination. The more you know the more you want to know and the more you want to develop that."

== Critical reception ==
The response towards the series has been generally positive. Some reviews of the series website included a The Independent review that "Really Rotten Experiments" is "Perfect for keeping the kids occupied on a rainy day, this is full of useful tips...and fun, naughty experiments". Another review by the Evening Express (Aberdeen) said that the book Horrible Science: Painful Poison is "With fantastic fact files, quirky quizzes, humorous cartoons and easy-to-understand text, it makes science pretty horrible, but great fun". Books For Keeps said of the book Deadly Diseases: "Gruesome gut churning contents, you need a strong stomach to tackle this, and certainly before eating". The Scotsman commented on the series as a whole, "Nick Arnold has a reputation as quite a showman and his Horrible Science series provides him with plenty of opportunity for stunts. Children emerge wide-eyed and inspired". A review at described the series as "These are so much better than some of the dry textbooks that I used to have to read when I was in school...I'm saying that books like this are great for students because they show students that science is truly interesting and amazing!". A review by Roberta of the Growing with Science blog said of the book Chemical Chaos: "It is every bit as humorous (downright silly in spots) and as comprehensive as the history series was". She adds that the "[series as a whole] go a long way to fill that gap [between middle and high school students". As said of Evil Inventions in a review by Jennifer Cameron-Smith at: "This is a delightful book and would make a wonderful present for any budding young scientist as well as a worthwhile addition to a school library. Making science fun can sometimes be a challenge, but books such as this certainly assist."

=== Awards and nominations ===
The Horrible Science series has received the following awards :

- The ZSL Thomson Reuters Record Award for Communicating Science awarded to Arnold and de Saulles for Wasted World. Arnold said "For a science writer, the Thomson Reuters ZSL Award is the World Cup and I am honoured and thrilled to have won it."
- Winner of the Junior Aventis Science Book Prize 2004 for Really Rotten Experiments
- Winner of the Rhône-Poulenc Junior Science Book Prize 1997 for Blood Bones & Body Bits
- Winner of the Rhône-Poulenc Junior Science Book Prize 1997 for Ugly Bugs
- Winner of the Royal Society Prizes for Science Books 2004 awarded to Arnold and de Saulles for Really Rotten Experiments
- Nominee of the Royal Society Prizes for Science Books 2003 awarded to Arnold for The Terrible Truth About Time
- Nominee of the Royal Society Prizes for Science Books 2001 awarded to Arnold for Suffering Scientists
- Winner of the Royal Society Prizes for Science Books 1997 awarded to Arnold for Blood Bones and Body Bits and Ugly Bugs

== Book categories ==
=== Original books ===
These are the original books in the core series:

- Blood, Bones and Body Bits (1996) (Human body)
- Ugly Bugs (1996) (Insects and invertebrates)
- Chemical Chaos (1997) (Chemical substance and Alchemy)
- Fatal Forces (1997) (Forces and motion)
- Nasty Nature (1997) (The animal kingdom depicted in nature and those who study it)
- Disgusting Digestion (1998) (Digestion)
- Sounds Dreadful (1998) (Sound)
- Vicious Veg (1998) (Plants)
- Bulging Brains (1999) (Brain)
- Evolve or Die (1999) (Evolution)
- Frightening Light (1999) (Light)
- Deadly Diseases (2000) (Infectious diseases)
- Shocking Electricity (2000) (Electricity, both artificial and in nature)
- Killer Energy (2001) (Energy and thermodynamics)
- Suffering Scientists (2001) (Scientist)
- Microscopic Monsters (2001) (The very small - Bacteria, germs and viruses)
- Body Owner's Handbook (2002) (Human body)
- The Terrible Truth about Time (2002) (Time)
- Space, Stars and Slimy Aliens (2003) (Space)
- Really Rotten Experiments (2004) (Experiment)
- The Fearsome Fight for Flight (2004) (The History of Flight)
- Painful Poison (2004) (Poison)
- Angry Animals (2005)
- Measly Medicine (2006) (Medicine)
- Evil Inventions (2007) (Inventions)
- Wasted World (2009) (Global Warming)
- Sick! From Measly Medicine to Savage Surgery (2009) (Surgery)
- The Horrible Science of YOU (2009) (Human Body)
- How to Draw Horrible Science (2011)
- House of Horrors (2012) (Bacteria and microorganisms)

=== Omnibus editions and boxed sets ===
There are several "Two in One" editions:

- Ugly Bugs and Nasty Nature
- Blood, Bones and Body Bits and Chemical Chaos
- Frightening Light and Sounds Dreadful
- Bulging Brains and Disgusting Digestion
- Microscopic Monsters and Deadly Diseases
- Killer Energy and Shocking Electricity
- Fatal Forces and The Fight for Flight

There have also been Three in One editions such as Ugly Bugs, Nasty Nature and Vicious Veg, a set of 10 books (Vicious Veg, Space, Stars, and Slimy Aliens, Ugly Bugs, Bulging Brains, Deadly Diseases, Chemical Chaos, Disgusting Digestion, Blood, Bones, and Body Bits, Nasty Nature, and Evil Inventions) titled Ten Beastly Books, and a set of 20 (Angry Animals, Blood, Bones and Body Bits, Bulging Brains, Chemical Chaos Deadly Diseases Disgusting Digestion, Evolve or Die, Fatal Forces, The Fight for Flight, Frightening Light, Killer Energy, Microscopic Monsters, Nasty Nature, Painful Poison, Shocking Electricity, Sounds Dreadful, Space, Stars, and Slimy Aliens, The Terrible Truth About Time, Ugly Bugs, and Vicious Veg) titled Bulging Box of Books.

=== Activity books ===
==== Shuffle puzzle books ====
- Angry Animals Shuffle Puzzle Book (2008)
- The Blood, Bones and Body Bits Shuffle Puzzle Book

==== Jigsaw books ====
- Dangerous Dinosaurs Jigsaw Book (2006) (Dinosaurs)
- The Seriously Squishy Jigsaw Book
- Ugly Bugs Jigsaw Book (2008)

==== Sticker-activity books ====
- Disgusting Digestion Sticker-Activity Book
- Ugly Bugs Sticker-Activity Book

==== Others ====
- The Seriously Squishy Quiz Book Pack
- The Awfully Big Quiz Book

It may be noted that the Sticker-Activity books have been renamed, along with their new design, by dropping the "Sticker" aspect and leaving "Activity".

=== Annuals ===
- Annual 2008
- Annual 2009
- Annual 2010
- Annual 2011
- Annual 2012
- Annual 2013
- Annual 2014
- Annual 2015
- Annual 2016

=== Specials ===
There are a couple books in the Horrible Science series that have a special sign on the front cover that indicate their inclusion in the "Special" sub-series of Horrible Science:

- Explosive Experiments (2001) (Science Experiments)
- Suffering Scientists (2000)(Scientist)

=== Handbooks ===
Following suit with the other main Horrible series', Horrible Science has recently introduced a new range of books, known as Handbooks.

- Beastly Body Experiments
- Bulging Brain Experiment
- Freaky Food Experiments
- Famously Foul Experiments
- Sharks

=== Teachers resources ===
The Horrible Science Teachers Resources subseries is, as described by Nick Arnold: "a whole series of books full of expert tips and photocopiable resources designed for pupils aged 7–11".

- Electricity
- The Human Body
- Forces
- Animals
- Sound
- Light
- Minibeasts
- Plants
- Micro-organisms
- Earth and Beyond

=== Others ===
These are the books that do not fit into the other categories. They are:

- The Awfully Big Quiz Book (2000) (Science)
- The Horrible Science of Everything (2005) (Science)
- Really Rotten Experiments (2003) (Science Experiments)
- The Seriously Squishy Science Book (2007 World Book Day Special)
- Smelly Science (Science)
- The Stunning Science of Everything (2005)
- How to Draw Horrible Science (2011)

== Magazines ==
The front cover of the issue Super Sleuth

There is also a magazine collection to this series, which is collectively known as the Horrible Science Collection. This series was originally planned to encompass 60 issues, but due to their popularity, another 20 were added to the series. The titles are as follows:

1. Beastly Body Bits - (Human Body)
2. Chemical Chaos - (Chemicals)
3. The Smashing Solar System - (Solar System)
4. Disgusting Digestion - (Digestive System)
5. Shocking Electricity - (Electricity)
6. Hidden Horrors In The Home - (Bacteria and Germs)
7. Bulging Brains - (Brains)
8. Savage Spiders & Slippery Slimeballs - (Spiders and Slugs)
9. Rotten Reactions - (Chemical reactions)
10. Beastly Bloody Body Bits - (Human Body)
11. Awful Earth - (Earth)
12. Mad as Matter - (Matter)
13. Painful Poisons - (Poisons)
14. Bones 'n' Groans - (Bones)
15. Insect Invaders - (Insects)
16. Super Sleuth - (Spies Codes)
17. Nasty Nature - (Nature)
18. Fearsome Fuels - (Fossil Fuels)
19. Deadly Diseases - (Diseases)
20. Gruesome Gravity - (Gravity)
21. Mean Machines - (Machines)
22. Universe & Worse.... - (The Universe)
23. Vicious Veg - (Plants)
24. Body Owner's Manual - (Body Parts)
25. Lethal Lightning - (Lightning)
26. Mean Mammals - (Mammals)
27. Mighty Magnetism - (Magnetism)
28. Awesome Ants & Sleazy Bees - (Ants and Bees)
29. Fatal Forces - (Forces)
30. Crazy Cures & Revolting Remedies - (Cures)
31. Barmy Birds - (Birds)
32. Blast Off! - (Spacecraft)
33. Evil Evolution - (Evolution)
34. Horrible Heat - (Heat)
35. Freaky Fish - (Fish)
36. Startling Senses - (The 5 Senses: Sight, Smell, Taste, Touch and Hearing)
37. Sounds Dreadful - (Sound)
38. Sinister Swamps - (Swamps)
39. Ghastly Genes - (Genes)
40. Microscopic Monsters - (Microorganisms)
41. Growing Up Grossly - (Growth)
42. Foul Frogs & Slimy Toads - (Frogs and Toads)
43. Terrible Time - (Time)
44. Frightening Light - (Light)
45. Dangerous Dinosaurs - (Dinosaurs)
46. More Painful Poisons - (Poisons)
47. Fearsome Flight - (Flight)
48. Foul Food - (Food)
49. Staying Alive - (Survival)
50. Fearsome Flying Machines - (Flying Machines)
51. Revolting Reptiles - (Reptiles)
52. Dead Freezing - (Cold)
53. Noisy Nature - (The animal kingdom)
54. Mad Medicine - (Medicine)
55. Foul Fungi - (Fungi)
56. More Dangerous Dinosaurs - (Dinosaurs)
57. Blinding Light - (Light)
58. Gruesome Germs - (Germs)
59. Slimy Sea Monsters - (Sea creatures)
60. It's About Time - (Time)
61. Perilous Planes - (Planes)
62. Big And Bad Beasts - (Dangerous Animals)
63. Shady Spies - (Spies)
64. Musical Mayhem - (Sounds and Music)
65. Prehistoric Pests - (Prehistoric Life)
66. Baffling Brainboxes - (Human Brain)
67. Mind Boggling Materials - (Matter)
68. Pesky Plants - (Plants)
69. Wicked Weather - (Weather)
70. Underwater Uglies - (Aquatic animals)
71. Mean Body Machine - (The Human body)
72. Rowdy Robots - (Robots)
73. Gruesome Guzzling - (Eating and Digestion)
74. Nuclear Nasties - (Nuclear power)
75. Mind Magic - (Science of magic)
76. Hairy Humans - (Evolution of humans)
77. Freaky Future - (Futurology)
78. Horrid Healthcare - (Health and Medicine)
79. Awful Inventions - (Inventions, Technology)
80. How to be a Suffering Scientist - (Scientists)

There have also been three 'special' magazines in the series:

S1. DIY Shocking Science - (Experiments)

S2. Spooky Science - (Hallowe'en and Monsters)

S3. Alien Science - (Aliens)

== Flip charts ==
On 3 March, 2008, several online flip charts (aka Activlessons) were released by Promethean Planet. As the site explains, "these ready-made interactive whiteboard resources have instant child-appeal, making the teaching of the QCA Science units fun and effective". The titles included are:

- Animals and their Habitats
- The Human Body and Keeping Healthy
- Minibeasts
- Sounds
- Plants

== Television series ==
In May, 2015, British television network CITV announced that filming had begun on a new ten-part TV series of Horrible Science. The series is produced by Toff Media, a company owned and founded by comedians Ben Miller and Alexander Armstrong, and co-owned by Hat Trick Productions.

The series stars Ben Miller, stand-up comedian Chris Martin, Tom Bell, Jason Forbes, Letty Butler, Susan Wokoma and Eleanor Lawrence. There will also be some guest appearances by other actors.

The series focuses on a science show and its crew that consist of the show's host Mark (Martin), a talking brain Professor McTaggart (Miller) (who hosts the segment called The Brain Dump), robot Bob (Bell), microscopic Professor Small (Lawrence) and her crew of scientists and the show's producer Lucy (Butler). Armstrong provides the voice of the unseen announcer Tannoy who tells the crew how long until the show starts. Each episode also features a famous scientist being interviewed by either Mark or McTaggart. In a similar vein to the TV adaptation of Horrible Histories, each episode also concludes with a song that serves as a parody of another popular song.

=== Episodes ===
Series 1 began on 13 September 2015.

No. overall	No. in series	Title	Directed by	Written by	Original release date
1	1	"Deadly Diseases"	Simon Gibney	Mark Oswin	13 September 2015
This episode coughs up the disgusting details of snot, sneezes and viruses, from the cruel common cold to shocking smallpox.
2	2	"Abominable Blood"	Simon Gibney	Marc Haynes and Will Maclean	20 September 2015
Red blood – what is it and why do we need it? How does it transport important things around the body? Bob the robot needs his first aid badge so he can go to the robot jamboree – the only trouble is he is hates blood. Mark is stopped just in time by expert Charles Drew as he is about to give someone a blood transfusion from a dog!
3	3	"Chemical Chaos"	Simon Gibney	Marc Haynes and Will Maclean	27 September 2015
This episode features explosions, atoms and fiendish forces that bubble, go bang and bump! What makes things explode? Lucy has made a mistake in the script and now everyone thinks the show is about elephants. It is a disaster – especially as their guest is the legendary scientist Marie Curie! Song of the Week: "Elements"
4	4	"Space, Stars and Slimy Aliens"	Simon Gibney	David Armand	4 October 2015
This episode examines what happens to our bodies in space. Can we live on other planets? Who invented the telescope, and how can we make one at home? Guest star: Marcus Garvey as Galileo Galilei Song of the Week: "I'm Mr. Average"
5	5	"Wasted World"	Unknown	Unknown	11 October 2015
Gruesome greenhouse gasses and deadly toxic waste. Why do we recycle and what would happen if we stopped? Is global warming really bad news? The team try to find out what is going on with the climate, although the show nearly ends in disaster again when they discover there is a bear roaming free in the studio! Guest star: Bear Grylls Song of the Week: "Let It Snow"
6	6	"Gruesome Guts"	Simon Gibney	Unknown	18 October 2015
This episode examines poo, pizza and disgusting germs! Why do we poo and how does digestion work? Who was Louis Pasteur and what is his legacy? Mark arrives at the studio with terrible stomach pains and asks the Shrinking Scientists to find out what is wrong with him. In their toughest mission yet, Dr Sensible, Professor Small and Junior get ready to fly up Mark's nose to investigate. Guest star: Marcus Garvey as Louis Pasteur Song of the Week: "Poohemian Rhapsody"
7	7	"Microscopic Monsters"	Unknown	Unknown	25 October 2015
This episode examines some of the nasty invaders that live in our homes and on our bodies. Fleas, parasites, worms and every tiny, disgusting thing in between. Mark can't stop itching, but no one knows what is causing it. The Shrinking Scientists get on the case and investigate. Microscope expert Robert Hooke joins them in the studio. Song of the Week: "8 Pints"
8	8	"Bulging Brains"	Unknown	Unknown	1 November 2015
9	9	"Sounds Dreadful"	Unknown	Unknown	8 November 2015
Guest star: David Armand as Alexander Graham Bell
10	10	"Vicious Veg"	Unknown	Unknown	15 November 2015
Song of the Week: "Killer Veg"
