= Cahier Africain =

2016 documentary film by Heidi Specogna

- Directed by: Heidi Specogna
- Written by: Heidi Specogna
- Produced by: Peter Spoerri, Stefan Tolz, Heidi Specogna
- Narrated by: Salena Godden
- Cinematography: Johann Feindt
- Edited by: Kaya Inan
- Music by: Peter Scherer
- Production companies: Filmpunkt, PS Film
- Distributed by: Rushlake Media GmbH; Filmbringer Distribution AG
- Release date: August 7, 2016 (Locarno)
- Running time: 118 minutes
- Countries: Switzerland; Germany
- Languages: Arabic, French, English

Cahier Africain ([kaje afʁikɛ̃], "African Notebook") is a 2016 documentary film by Heidi Specogna, a Swiss filmmaker. Beginning in 2008, Specogna's long-term observation follows the lives of two young Central African women, Amzine and Arlette. The film was prompted by the discovery of a small exercise book, full of courageous testimonies by more than 300 victims of war crimes committed by Central African mercenaries during armed conflict between October 2002 and March 2003.

Cahier Africain premiered in 2016 at the Locarno Film Festival, where it received the Zonta Club Award, and the film's UK premiere was in September 2017 at the 25th Raindance Film Festival in London. Salena Godden was the film's English-language narrator.

== Content ==
Amzine, a young Muslim woman, gave birth to a child as a result of rape. Looking at her now 12-year-old daughter Fane is a daily reminder of the suffering she entrusted to this book.

Arlette, a Christian girl, has been in agony for years due to a gunshot to her knee that refused to heal. After successful surgery in Berlin, she holds on to hope for a pain-free existence.

But while the two young women try to master their difficult daily lives with confidence – and while, in The Hague, the legal prosecution of crimes committed during the last war is still in progress – the next war breaks out in the Central African Republic. Amzine, Fane and Arlette must once again face a maelstrom of violence, death and expulsion. At their side, the film bears witness to the collapse of order and civilization in a country torn apart by civil war and coup d'états.

== Reception ==
Giorgia Del Don wrote about Cahier Africain in Cineuropa: "Heidi Specogna's latest film literally speaks through images [..] about a sad and hopeless beauty. Without ever toppling over into pity, the director portrays the everyday reality of her protagonists with dashes of hope." The review particularly praises the intensity of the film: "Heidi Specogna [...] make[s] us understand to what extent life has the same value everywhere. A terrible and poetic film it takes extreme courage to watch."

== Awards ==
Cahier Africain won the Zonta Club Award at Locarno International Film Festival 2016.

At DOK Leipzig 2016, Cahier Africain was awarded the Silver Dove.

Cahier Africain received the 2016 German Human Rights Film Award (Deutscher Menschenrechts-Filmpreis)
