= Nikesh Shukla =

British author and screenwriter (born 1980)

- Born: 8 July 1980 (age 46); Harrow, London, England
- Occupations: Author; Screenwriter
- Years active: 2010–present
- Website: nikesh-shukla.com

Nikesh Shukla FRSL (born 8 July 1980) is a British author and screenwriter. His writing focuses on race, racism, identity, and immigration. He is the editor of the 2016 collection of essays The Good Immigrant, which features contributions from Riz Ahmed, Musa Okwonga, Bim Adewunmi, and Reni Eddo-Lodge, among others. With Chimène Suleyman, he co-edited the 2019 follow-up collection called The Good Immigrant: 26 Writers Reflect On America.

== Early life and career ==
Shukla was born to Indian immigrants in the London suburb Harrow. He attended Merchant Taylors' school in Northwood, leaving in 1996, then Dr. Challoner's Grammar School.

== Career ==
=== Literature ===
Shukla is the author of four novels: Coconut Unlimited (2010), Meatspace (2014), The One Who Wrote Destiny (2018), and The Council of Good Friends (2020).

He is also the author of two books for Young Adults: Run, Riot (2018) and The Boxer (2019).

In 2017 he co-founded the Jhalak Prize, awarded annually to British or British resident writers of colour.

In 2019 he was made a Fellow of the Royal Society of Literature. He was a Rathbones Folio Prize Mentor in 2019–2020.

Brown Baby, a memoir addressed to his young daughter, was published in 2021. He hosts a podcast of the same name.

In 2021, Shukla turned down an MBE for services to literature, saying, "The main reason for not accepting the MBE was because I hate how it valorises the British Empire, a brutal, bloody thing that resulted in so much death and destruction. To accept the MBE would be to co-sign it". In an explanatory piece for The Guardian, he said he didn't want an honour glorifying the British Empire and asked, if the British Empire was something to be proud of, why Operation Legacy (a British government programme to destroy evidence of the empire's brutalities) was needed.

=== Film ===
Shukla co-wrote the short film Two Dosas with Sarmad Masud. It starred Himesh Patel. After Danny Boyle awarded the film Best Short at the 2017 Shuffle Festival, Boyle cast Patel in the title role of Jack in Yesterday (2019).

=== Journalism ===
Shukla has been a columnist for The Observer's magazine supplement and The Pool.

=== Radio and podcasts ===
In January 2019, Shukla appeared in series 47 of the BBC Radio 4 show Great Lives, nominating Pakistani wrestler The Great Gama (1878–1960).

Shukla hosted a podcast called The Subaltern podcast, in which he has conversations with writers about writing. He also co-hosted a podcast called Meat Up, Hulk Out with sci-fi writer James Smythe.

== Selected works and publications ==
=== Books ===
- Shukla, Nikesh (2010). Coconut Unlimited. London: Quartet. ISBN 978-0-704-37204-7. OCLC 661047464.
- Shukla, Nikesh (2013). The Time Machine. New York: Galley Beggar Press. ISBN 978-1-910-29605-9. OCLC 875097790.
- Shukla, Nikesh (2014). Meatspace. London: Friday Project. ISBN 978-0-007-56508-5. OCLC 1004224836.
- Shukla, Nikesh (2018). The One Who Wrote Destiny. London: Atlantic Books. ISBN 978-1-786-49280-7. OCLC 1098249965.
- Shukla, Nikesh (2018). Run, Riot. London: Hodder Children's Books. ISBN 978-1-444-94068-8. OCLC 1039899069.
- Shukla, Nikesh (2019). The Boxer. London: Hodder Children's Books. ISBN 978-1-444-94070-1. OCLC 1110445739.
- Shukla, Nikesh (2021). Brown Baby: A Memoir of Race, Family and Home. London: Pan Macmillan. ISBN 978-1-529-03291-8. OCLC 1144864045.

=== Collections ===
- Shukla, Nikesh, ed. (2016). The Good Immigrant: 21 Writers Explore What It Means to be Black, Asian & Minority Ethnic in Britain Today. London: Unbound. ISBN 978-1-783-52296-5. OCLC 1064008971.
- Shukla, Nikesh; Suleyman, Chimène, eds. (2019). The Good Immigrant: 26 Writers Reflect on America. New York: Little, Brown and Company. ISBN 978-0-316-52429-2. OCLC 1083266326.
- Shukla, Nikesh; Jones, Sammy, eds. (2019). Rife: Twenty-One Stories from Britain's Youth. New York: Little, Brown and Company. ISBN 978-0-316-52429-2. OCLC 1107493815.

=== Other work ===
- Yates, Kieran; Shukla, Nikesh (2011). Summer of Unrest: Generation Vexed: What the English Riots Don't Tell Us About Our Nation's Youth. London: Vintage Digital. ISBN 978-1-448-11475-7.
- Shukla, Nikesh (2013). The Time Machine. London: Galley Beggar Press.
- Heuchan, Claire; Shukla, Nikesh (2018). What is Race? Who are Racists? Why Does Skin Colour Matter? And Other Big Questions. London, England: Wayland. ISBN 978-1526303981.

== Filmography ==
- 2014: Two Dosas (short film) - co-writer
- 2011: Kabadasses (TV series)

== Honours ==
- 2010: Costa Book Awards, first novel, short-list for Coconut Unlimited
- 2010: Desmond Elliott Prize, long-list for Coconut Unlimited
- 2014: Aspen Shortsfest's "Best Comedy" Short Film for Two Dosas
- 2013: Sabotage Awards, Best Novella for The Time Machine
- 2014: London Calling Plus "Jury Award" for Two Dosas
- 2014: Shuffle Festival, Best Short for Two Dosas
- 2016: Liberty Human Rights Award, shortlist
- 2016: Books Are My Bag Readers' Awards, reader's choice for The Good Immigrant
- 2016: British Book Awards, Book of the Year short-list for The Good Immigrant
- 2016: The Bookseller's 100 most influential people in publishing
- 2016: Foreign Policy's 100 Global Thinkers
- 2019: Time magazine, one of the twelve leaders shaping the next generation of artists
- 2019: CrimeFest Awards, Best YA for Run, Riot
- 2019: National Book Awards, short-list for Run, Riot
- 2019: Royal Society of Literature, Fellow
- 2021: Declined offer of MBE for services to literature in the Queen's birthday honours list.
