= Otto English =

British author

- Born: Andrew Scott; Essex, England
- Occupations: Author, journalist
- Notable work: Fake History

Otto English is the pen name of writer and journalist Andrew Scott.

Scott had written for theatre and television before moving into political journalism. From 2010 he began writing about history and politics, often through his blog, The Pinprick. According to his blog, Scott came up with the pen name Otto English on the spot when asked to appear on a BBC programme. The rise to fame of actor Andrew Scott then persuaded English to stick with the pen name "rather than get confused with Moriarty", whom the actor had played in the BBC One drama Sherlock.

He has written extensively for Politico and Byline Times, and in 2021 published a non-fiction book, Fake History. Fake History looks at "the 10 biggest lies from history and... at the people who propagated them", including the idea that the British royal family are German, or that Adolf Hitler was a failed artist.

In 2023, English published a follow-up book, Fake Heroes, in which he profiles ten historical figures and analyses myths connected to them.

English has also frequently appeared on Byline Times' TV channel, and written for the website about British history and the country's obsession with class.

English has been called an "anti-Brexit firebrand" by historian Dominic Sandbrook, who labelled the author a "woke activist" in his critical review of Fake History for UnHerd. Fake History received generally positive reviews from The South African, BusinessLive.co.za and The Canberra Times.

== Bibliography ==
- Fake History: Ten Great Lies and How They Shaped the World (2021), Welbeck Publishing, ISBN 9781787396418
- Fake Heroes: Ten False Icons and How They Altered the Course of History (2023), Welbeck Publishing, ISBN 9781802795912
