= Phil Wang =

British Chinese-Malaysian comedian

Phil Wang 王兴贵
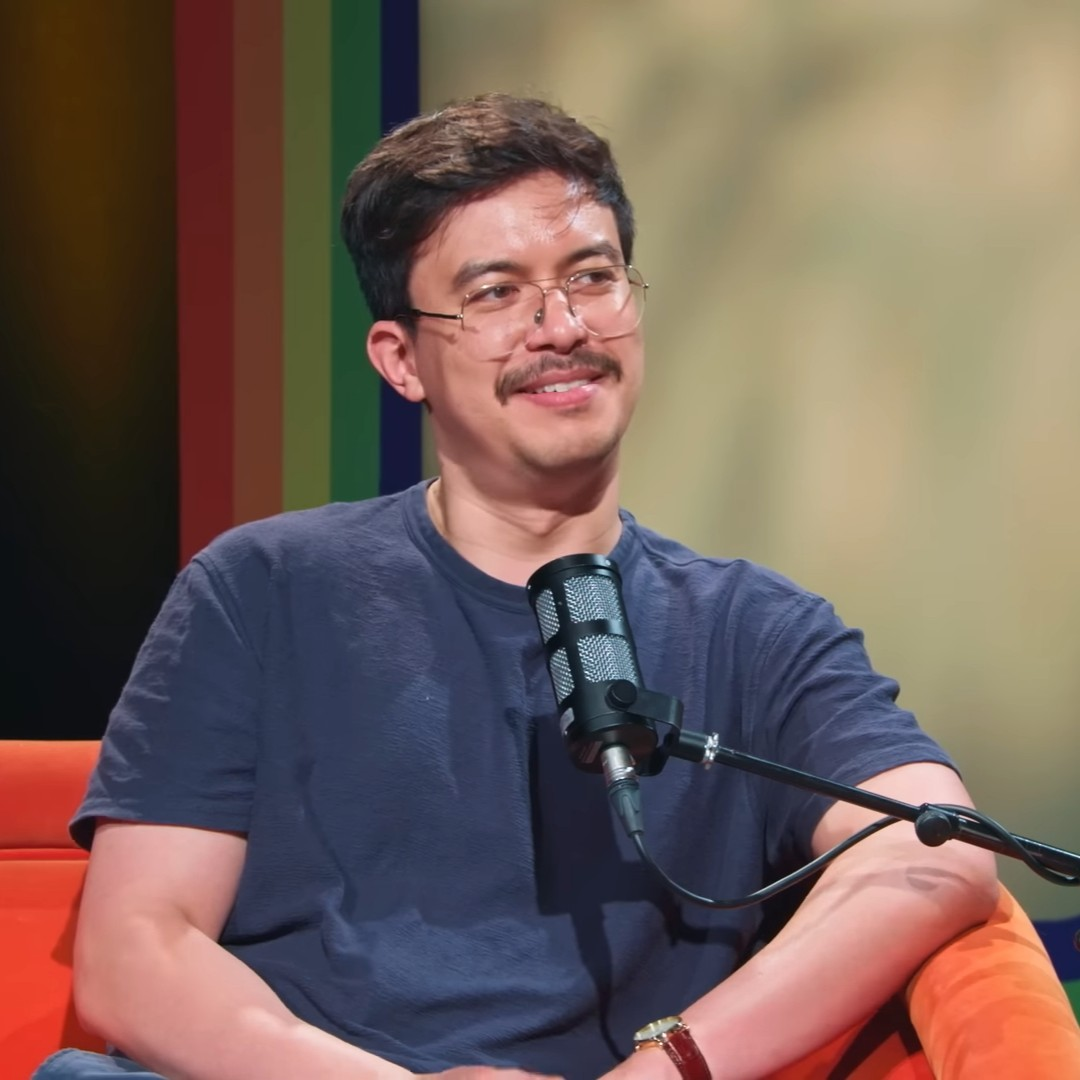
- Wang in 2026
- Born: Philip Nathaniel Wang Sin Goi; 22 January 1990 (age 36); Stoke-on-Trent, Staffordshire, England
- Education: King's College, Cambridge (BA (Hons), MEng)

Comedy career
- Medium: Stand-up, television, radio
- Website: www.philwang.co.uk

Philip Nathaniel Wang Sin Goi (Note: In this Malaysian Hakka Chinese name, the surname is Wang (王). In accordance with custom, the Western-style name is Phil Wang and the Chinese-style name is Wang Sin Goi (simplified Chinese: 王兴贵; traditional Chinese: 王興貴).) (simplified Chinese: 王兴贵; traditional Chinese: 王興貴; pinyin: Wáng Xīngguì; Pha̍k-fa-sṳ: Vòng Hîn-kùi; born 22 January 1990) is a Malaysian-British stand-up comedian and comedy writer who is a member of the sketch comedy group Daphne, and co-creator of their BBC Radio 4 series, Daphne Sounds Expensive. Until 2025, he hosted the comedy podcast BudPod with fellow comedian and Footlights alumnus Pierre Novellie.

== Early life and education ==
Philip Nathaniel Wang Sin Goi was born on 22 January 1990 in Stoke-on-Trent, Staffordshire, England. His mother is English and his father Chinese-Malaysian of Hakka and Kadazan-Dusun descent from suburban Tuaran district in Sabah's northern West Coast Division. A few weeks after his birth, his family returned to the city of Kota Kinabalu in Sabah, Malaysia, where his parents had first met in 1982.

Wang was raised in Kota Kinabalu, Malaysia, and educated in Malay, Mandarin, and English. He first started secondary studies at Maktab Nasional in Kota Kinabalu before later moving on to the Jerudong International School in Brunei. He then moved to Bath, United Kingdom at 16. Wang attended Kingswood School and then completed a four-year engineering degree at King's College, Cambridge, where he was president of the Cambridge Footlights in 2012.

== Career ==
=== Live stand-up ===
Wang won the 2010 Chortle Student Comedian of the Year Award and, in 2011, Comedy Central's Funniest Student Award.

He performed at the Melbourne International Comedy Festival in March 2015. In that year, he was a member of the sketch comedy group Daphne, who performed at the Edinburgh Festival Fringe in August of that year.

Wang embarked on a worldwide comedy tour ending in 2024.

=== TV and radio ===
Wang has made numerous television and radio appearances, including on shows such as Taskmaster, Would I Lie to You?, Have I Got News for You (including as compère in 2024), and 8 Out of 10 Cats Does Countdown. He has performed stand-up on Live at the Apollo and competed on Roast Battle. His BBC Radio 4 comedy special Wangsplaining aired in 2019.

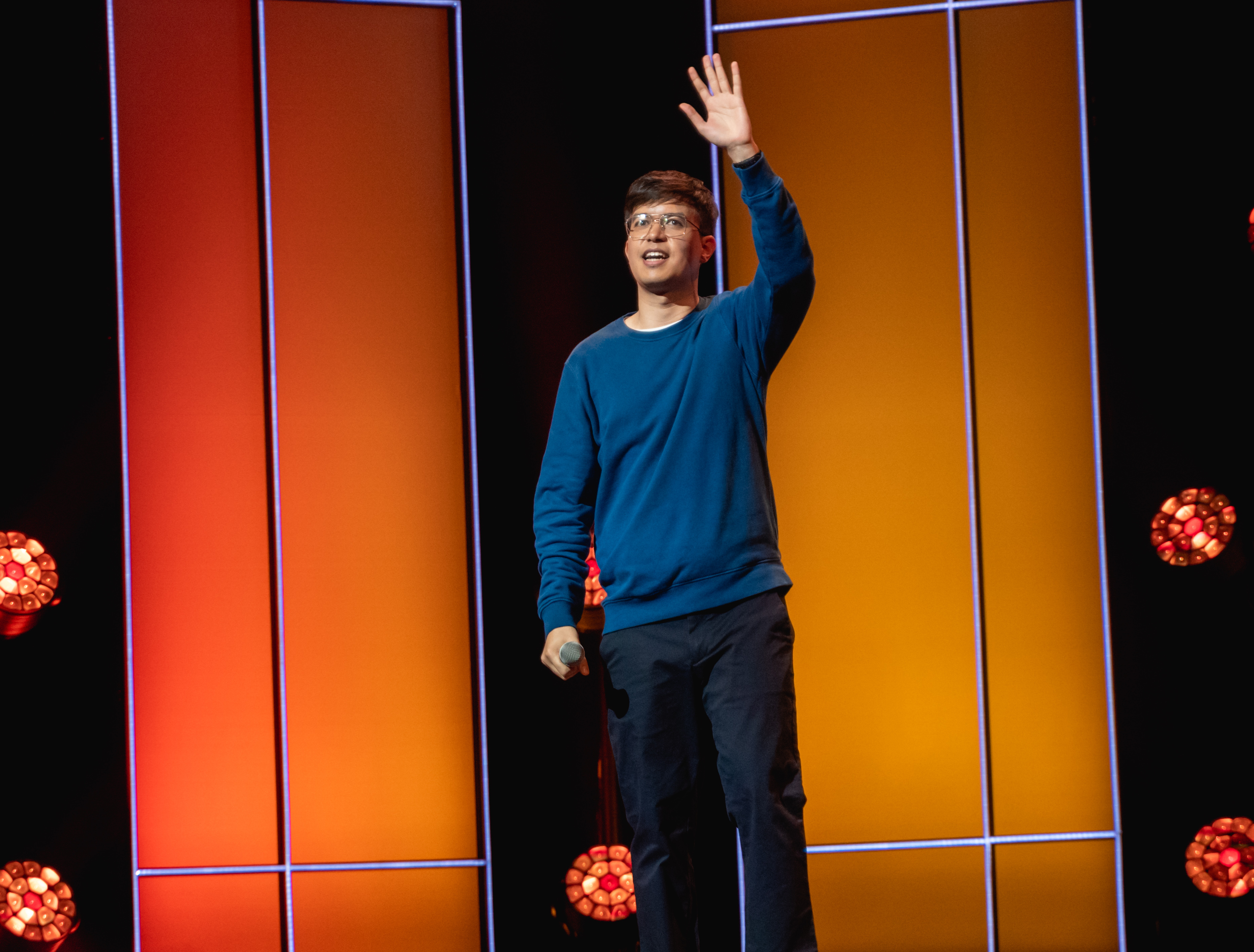
Wang performing in 2021

Wang released the Netflix specials Philly Philly Wang Wang in 2021 and Wang In There, Baby! in 2024.

He acted in the sitcom Top Coppers, appeared in the 2023 film Wonka, and played a role in the Netflix series 3 Body Problem.

In 2021, he launched the Audible podcast Phil Wang Hates Horror.

=== Other activities ===
Wang's first book, Sidesplitter: How to Be from Two Worlds at Once, was published in 2021.

He hosted the British Academy Games Awards in both 2024 and 2025.

From 2026, Wang is a judge on Great British Menu, replacing Ed Gamble.

== Works ==
- Sidesplitter: How To Be From Two Worlds At Once (Coronet Books, 2021) ISBN 978-1529350272
