= Nick Arnold (writer) =

British writer

- Born: 4 August 1961 (age 65); Cambridge, Cambridgeshire, England
- Occupation: Writer
- Writing career
- Pen name: Robert Roland
- Genre: Science books for children

Nick Arnold (born 4 August 1961) is a British writer of science books for children. He is best known for the long series Horrible Science, illustrated by Tony De Saulles, and the short series Wild Lives, illustrated by Jane Cope. His other works include some published under the name Robert Roland.

Arnold was born in Cambridge, England. His first published works appeared as a result of a project he was working on at the University of North London, when he was trying to teach young children. A positive review was written about him and he started to write the Horrible Science books.

Arnold left school with many history qualifications but decided to become a writer. He found it hard to get published however. He became an editor in London hoping that "working as an editor might help him get his own books published". In London, he struggled to find work, eventually taking a job editing science books. Nick began to write articles with a friend named Vip Patel. Some of these ended up in The Guardian newspaper. Eventually he was out of work and decided to write books so wrote to every publisher in Britain requesting work. Scholastic pitched to him the concept of a series named Horrible Science and Arnold soon wrote Ugly Bugs. An illustrator for Scholastic named Tony De Saulles was hired as the illustrator for the series. This book was released alongside Blood, Bones and Body Bits, and the high sales solidified the series. In 1998, he broke his arm whilst performing a Horrible Science show. He finished the show and signed books before being rushed to the hospital. In 2004, Arnold became the first British author to tour China. He and Tony De Saulles filmed a TV show there and promoted the Chinese edition of the Horrible Science series.

In 2006, Arnold founded the Appledore Book Festival after leading a campaign to save the Appledore village library from closure. Two years later, Arnold achieved publicity for his claim to have located the site of the Battle of Cynwit, fought between Saxons and Danes in 878.

== See also ==
- Horrible Science
- List of children's non-fiction writers
