= Sky News =

British and international television news channel

Coordinates: 51°29′19″N 00°19′41″W

- Logo used since March 2026, but not used on-screen.
- Country: United Kingdom
- Broadcast area: Worldwide
- Headquarters: Sky Central, Osterley, London

Programming
- Language: English
- Picture format: 1080i HDTV

Ownership
- Owner: Comcast
- Parent: Sky Group
- Key people: David Rhodes (Head of Sky News Group); Jonathan Levy (Managing Director and Executive Editor, Sky News UK); Sarah Whitehead (Director of Newsgathering and Operations)
- Sister channels: List of Sky UK channels

History
- Launched: 5 February 1989; 37 years ago

Links
- Webcast: Live Stream; Official YouTube Channel
- Website: news.sky.com

Availability

Terrestrial
- Freeview: Channel 233
- BT TV: Channel 233; Channel 313; Channel 385 (HD)
- Saorview (Ireland): Channel 23

Streaming media
- Services (United States): Samsung TV Plus, Pluto TV

Sky News is a British free-to-air television news channel, live stream news network, and news organisation. Sky News is distributed via an English-language radio news service, and through online channels. It is owned by Sky Group, a division of Comcast. In 2024, Sky News was named Royal Television Society News Channel of the Year, the 17th time it has held the award and the channel's 7th consecutive win. The channel and its live streaming world news are available on its website, television platforms, and online platforms such as YouTube and Apple TV, and various mobile devices and digital media players.

A sister channel, Sky News Arabia, is operated as a joint venture with the Abu Dhabi Media Investment Corporation. A channel called Sky News International, simulcasting the UK channel directly but without British advertisements, is available in Europe, the Middle East, Africa, South Asia, Asia Pacific, Australia, and the Americas. Narrated segments (which generally cover lighter issues unrelated to current news stories) are played in place of advertisements, and international weather forecasts are also given at the end of each half-hour newscast. Sponsored advertisements are still broadcast before and/or after the sports news and weather segments. Sky News Radio provides national and international news to commercial radio and community radio stations in the UK and other English-language stations around the world. Sky News also provides content to Yahoo! News.

In Australia, News24 (originally known as Sky News Australia) was part-owned by Sky News parent Sky plc until December 2016, cutting ties completely with its UK counterpart in 2018 following Sky's sale to Comcast, but retained the Sky News brand under license. In February 2026, News Corp Australia announced that the Australian channel would be renamed as News24 effective 27 July 2026, following the expiration of the brand licensing agreement.

== History ==
=== Establishment and early years ===
On 8 June 1988, Rupert Murdoch announced in a speech to the British Academy of Film and Television Arts plans to start a new television news service. Sky News started broadcasting at 6 pm on 5 February 1989.

Visually Sky News looked very neat, with slick and classy presentation and John O'Loan's original vocation as an architect showing in the studio set. Sky had gone for the same format as the Nine O'Clock News on the BBC, which had recently been redesigned to give the impression of activity and immediacy by placing the newsreader against a backdrop of the working newsroom. Sky News, it was universally agreed as staff nodded in vigorous approval, had succeeded rather better at the same thing. The critics were mildly taken aback. Contrary to some of the horror scenarios bandied about by the chattering classes there seemed to be little to grumble about. And as its slogan of 'We're there when you need us,' emphasised, it was always on.

In the early days, the channel operated on a £40 million budget (plus £10 million share of overheads), which led Sam Chisholm, chief executive of the newly merged BSkyB, to suggest to Murdoch that the station be closed, but Murdoch was "pleased with its achievements ... there were overriding reasons of prestige and politics for keeping it ... the final hurdle of the Broadcasting Bill had still to be overcome and the case for the acceptability of Sky would collapse if suddenly there was no news channel." Former Home Secretary William Whitelaw said in the House of Lords in 1990 that Sky News had "a very high reputation ... I admire it, as do many other people, it will certainly waken up both the BBC and ITN and ensure that they compete with what is a very important news service" Hansard October 1990. The channel (as of 2007) has never been run for a profit, and has considered using ITN to supplement the service.

By March 1992, Sky News' parent company turned from loss to profit. Sky News was the UK's first 24-hour news channel, broadcast on Astra 1A. It had no local competition until November 1997, when BBC News launched a new 24-hour channel, BBC News 24, now known simply as BBC News. In September 1999, the European Commission ruled against a Sky News complaint, which argued that the publicly funded BBC News 24 was unfair and illegal under EU law. The EC ruled that the television licence fee should be considered state aid (within the meaning of Article 87), but that the BBC's public service remit justified the channel.

=== 2000–2018 ===
Former Sky News logo, used until 2018

In March 2000, Sky News Active, a 24-hour interactive service providing headlines and other services which ranged from weather, the top story of the day, and showbiz on demand, was launched.

Analogue broadcasting of the channel ceased on 30 June 2001.

In March 2004, Sky News was announced to have won a five-year contract to supply news bulletins to Channel 5, taking over from ITN in January 2005.

On 24 October 2005, Sky News moved to new studios in Isleworth, Greater London, and underwent a major on-screen revamp. The new studio was integrated with the newsroom and boasted the biggest video wall in Britain; it was designed by New York architects Janson Design Group. New music was scored by Adelphoi Music and recorded with a full orchestra at Air Studios, Hampstead, and mastered at Metropolis Studios. New on-screen graphics were launched and the channel began broadcasting in widescreen (16:9) format.

The 2005 relaunch also had the introduction of a new schedule designed around "appointment to view" programmes rather than continuous rolling news. James Rubin joined to present a new evening programme called World News Tonight, Julie Etchingham presented another new "hard-hitting" evening show called The Sky Report, Eamonn Holmes joined to present Sunrise, Kay Burley presented a new programme called Lunchtime Live from 12 to 2 pm, and the daytime show Sky News Today had the introduction of a three-presenter format. However, the relaunched schedule was unsuccessful, and from October 2005, the BBC News channel overtook Sky News in the ratings.

In response to the schedule's unpopularity with viewers, July 2006 saw the removal of the evening programmes—which were replaced by rolling news and an interactive programme, Sky News with Martin Stanford, and the return to a two-presenter format on Sky News Today. These changes came with the arrival of the new Head of Sky News, John Ryley. On 1 October 2007, Sky introduced another new schedule, extending Kay Burley's Lunchtime Live programme and renaming it Afternoon Live. It also switched to a new format for much of the day, with a solo lead presenter and a summary newsreader. Sky News put more emphasis on interactive news with Martin Stanford's new SkyNews.com programme; an early evening financial news programme presented by Jeff Randall, was also introduced, initially on Mondays only. Further changes were made to the Sky News schedule on 8 September 2008, with Colin Brazier presenting a new show from 1 – 2 pm, The Live Desk, and Martin Stanford's Sky.com News became SkyNews.com, moving to 7 pm every weeknight. More changes took place during the early part of 2009. These changes involved major changes to the layout of the newsroom/studio, the introduction of a morning edition of The Live Desk and the extension of the financial news programme Jeff Randall Live to run for four nights each week, Monday to Thursday.

From 6 am to midnight on 8 March 2010, Sky News was presented and produced exclusively by women to mark International Women's Day. This exercise was repeated in 2011 and 2012.

In preparation for the start of high-definition broadcasting, Sky News moved to its second studio (Studio B) on the morning of 30 March 2010. Broadcasting from Studio B continued until 9 pm on 6 May, when it moved back to the main newsroom and launched Sky News HD in time for the 2010 general election results. Sky News received a graphics refresh and a new logo to coincide with the launch of the new HD channel – this was tried out during the soft launch for Sky News HD on 22 April; Sky News' distinctive orchestral theme music, in use since 2005, was also updated on 6 May 2010. The new title music, orchestrated by David Arnold, was recorded with a 60-piece Royal Philharmonic Orchestra in Angel Recording Studios, London, and uses more than 132 audio channels for 18 seconds of sound.

Following the 2015 general election, Sky News was rebranded, with a new top-of-the-hour sequence and on-screen graphics. The traditional opening voiceover, read by Bruce Hammal, was dropped after two decades in use. On 24 October 2016, Sky News began broadcasting from a new studio (Studio 21) at Sky Central, Sky's new headquarters in West London. The "glass box" studio was initially used for broadcasts from 6 am to 6.30 pm each weekday (with the exception of All Out Politics, which comes from Sky's Westminster studio) - as of April 2019 it was only used from 11 am to 7 pm, and 9 pm to 12 am. The schedule was also changed.

In January 2017, Sky moved its business operations into the News Building in central London. On 16 January 2018, Sky moved all its news operations over to Studio 21, "the glass box", and a new studio in Sky Studios.

=== Comcast acquisition, 2018–present ===
On 9 December 2016, Sky shareholder 21st Century Fox announced that it had made an offer to acquire the remainder of the company for £11.7 billion. The combination of Sky with Fox's other assets led to concerns that the Murdoch family would attain "material influence over news providers with a significant presence across all key platforms" and "increased influence over the UK news agenda and the political process". Concerns were also raised about recent sexual harassment allegations centred upon Fox's U.S. network Fox News, although Ofcom did deem 21st Century Fox to be "fit and proper" to hold broadcast licences. On 14 December 2017, The Walt Disney Company in turn announced its intent to acquire 21st Century Fox, following the divestiture of certain assets (particularly the U.S. Fox network proper). Analysts felt that would ease regulatory tensions surrounding the Fox purchase of Sky, as Sky was to be included in the purchase, and Disney's scope of media ownership in the UK was not as wide.

In January 2018, the Competition and Markets Authority issued a preliminary report recommending that Sky News be insulated from the remainder of Murdoch's assets, or divested, in order to preserve its editorial independence. The following month, Fox proposed a commitment to funding Sky News for 10 years, and the establishment of an independent editorial board. The commitments would have been inherited by Disney if it completed its purchase. On 3 April 2018, Fox stated that Disney had expressed interest in acquiring Sky News in a separate transaction, not dependent on the outcome of the Disney/Fox purchase.

On 5 June 2018, the then Culture Secretary Matt Hancock cleared Fox's proposed deal, contingent on the divestiture of Sky News. It also cleared counteroffers for Sky that were being made in a bidding war by U.S. telecoms and media conglomerate Comcast. Comcast made a US$65 billion counter-offer to acquire the 21st Century Fox assets being sold to Disney. Fox rejected the offer, in favour of a higher-valued offer from Disney. Comcast subsequently pursued a counter-offer for Sky only, resulting in the Panel on Takeovers and Mergers ordering that a blind auction be held between Comcast and Fox. On 22 September, Comcast was declared the winner of the auction, resulting in Fox agreeing to sell its controlling stake in Sky to the company.

The sale made Sky News a sister division to NBC News—a U.S.-based news operation owned by Comcast's U.S. media division NBCUniversal, its U.S. pay television news channel MSNBC, as well as Euronews—a pan-European news channel which NBCUniversal owned a stake in at the time of purchase. Since the acquisition, NBC News has occasionally simulcast Sky News on MSNBC and NBC News Now to cover international breaking news, while the two divisions have collaborated on projects such as podcasts. In April 2019, Comcast CEO Brian Roberts stated that the company was exploring the establishment of a "global" news channel as a joint venture between Sky News and NBC News. In January 2020, it was stated that this new channel would also be carried on NBCUniversal's new U.S. streaming video platform Peacock. In April 2020, it was stated that the launch of the service, by then known as NBC Sky World News, would be delayed due to the COVID-19 pandemic. On 20 April 2020, NBCUniversal sold its stake in Euronews to one of its existing shareholders, citing a desire to prioritise the NBC/Sky service instead. The proposed service was scrapped in August 2020, resulting in layoffs of 60 employees.

On 3 June 2021, Sky News updated its top-of-the-hour sequence, soundtrack, and on-screen graphics package. A Sky News source denied the move was related to the launch of GB News. On 9 February 2023, David Rhodes was appointed Executive Chairman of the Sky News Group in charge of all Sky's news operations. Jonathan Levy was appointed Managing Director and Executive Editor, Sky News UK.

On 19 July 2024, Sky News was taken offline by the 2024 CrowdStrike incident, briefly making it unable to broadcast live.

On 9 November 2024, Sky News released a video report on the November 2024 Amsterdam riots citing the fact that the violence was kickstarted by Israeli football fans chanting anti-Arab slurs and tearing down Palestinian flags from various properties. Shortly afterwards Sky News removed their coverage only to reupload an edited version seemingly removing culpability from the Israeli football fans for starting the violence, prompting outrage on social media.

On 25 September 2025, ahead of the planned spin-off of most of NBCUniversal's cable networks into a new company called Versant, MSNBC announced a "multi-year" agreement with Sky News to provide international newsgathering resources to the service after it separates from NBC News into an independent operation.

In May 2026, ITV News reported that Sky News was estimated to cost around £140 million a year to run with losses of £100 million.

== Reception ==
Sky News is free-to-air on the Astra 28.2°E satellites carrying Sky. It is also available on Freeview and analogue and digital cable. In 2007, BSkyB announced its intention to cease broadcasting Sky News – as well as other BSkyB channels – over Freeview, pending Ofcom approval.

In the 1990s, short-form news updates were broadcast between programs on other Sky networks, including Sky One, Sky Movies and The Movie Channel. Sky One also simulcast the 11PM Sky World News Hour for a time in the early 1990s.

=== Sky News International ===
Sky News is also available internationally on cable systems, on satellite, and in some hotels. While the UK feed is broadcast in 16:9, the international version remained broadcast in a 4:3 picture format until August 2010. Sky News broadcasts in Europe, Middle East, Africa.

The international version is shown as free-to-air on Astra 1L at 19.2° east. It is also carried encrypted on a number of satellites for international reception, including Hot Bird, Nilesat & Amos. It is also usually carried on cable systems in Europe, particularly in Northern Europe, especially in the Scandinavian countries.

International viewers receive the same programming line-up of Sky News as the UK version. Brief news stories, entertainment news, worldwide weather forecast summaries, and the front pages of international newspapers are broadcast in lieu of UK commercials. The timepiece on the lower left side of the ticker is covered with a banner that says "skynews.com".

Sky News is not available on Sky Deutschland, Sky plc's offering in Germany, but is available on Sky Italia.

On 19 June 2013, Sky News International was added to Apple TV for users in the UK, Ireland, and the United States. Viewers can watch clips or live streaming of the channel at no charge. On 24 July 2013, it was added to the Roku streaming player. Sky News International is available on news.sky.com to viewers around the world. On 30 September 2014, Sky News began live streaming the channel on YouTube. The free streaming service Pluto TV also offers a live feed of Sky News to American users on channel 135. Since its acquisition by Comcast, Sky News has been made available in the U.S. on the Peacock streaming service run by NBCUniversal, and simulcast on MSNBC (Note: MSNBC's simulcast only airs outside primetime hours.) and NBC News Now (Note: NBC News NOW's simulcast only airs on weekends and outside primetime hours.) during breaking news events of major significance such as the Russian invasion of Ukraine, the death of Queen Elizabeth II, the Wagner Group rebellion, and the Gaza war.

Sky News International and Sky News Ireland feeds are registered to broadcast within the European Union/EEA through ALIA in Luxembourg.

In 2023 Sky News UK launched on Bell Fibe in Canada, it was previously on Videotron,

=== Related channels ===
Sky News Arabia, broadcasting in Arabic and headquartered in Abu Dhabi, UAE, launched in 2012. Sky plc owns 50% of the channel.

Sky TG24, Italy's version of Sky News, launched in 2003.

News24 was one-third owned by Sky plc until December 2016, when it was acquired by News Corp Australia. It carries Sky News UK overnight and shares some of its presentational style. On Foxtel in Australia, Sky News UK is available on channel 604.

From 2004 to 2006, Sky News Ireland broadcast two newscasts produced in Dublin. The newscasts were cancelled due to low viewership. Sky News in Ireland now carries the same programming as Sky News in the UK with local insertion of Irish-specific ads.

=== Previous partnership with CBS News ===
Until 2017, Sky News had a resource-sharing agreement with CBS News in the United States to share footage and reporting. In July 2017, in the wake of Sky's pending takeover by 21st Century Fox (which runs the competing and former de facto sister Fox News Channel in the U.S.), and NBC News acquiring a stake in Euronews, CBS ended the agreement and entered into a similar deal with the BBC.

== Sky News HD ==
Former Sky News HD logo (2015–18)

Former Sky News HD logo (2010–13)

Beginning in early 2008, Sky News began using HD-capable cameras in the field. Some one-off programmes were made available in HD to Sky+ HD subscribers on Sky On Demand. The programmes included Technofile, Diana: The Final Word, Canoe Man: Rise and Fall of John Darwin, and Pathfinders: Into The Heart Of Afghanistan.

On 20 January 2009, before the launch of the Sky News HD channel, Sky Arts broadcast Sky News coverage in HD of the Inauguration of Barack Obama. Jeremy Thompson fronted the coverage from Washington, D.C. Michael Jackson's memorial service was also broadcast in HD, with Kay Burley presenting.

Sky News moved operations to a chroma-key set in Studio B from 30 March 2010, so final preparations for HD could take place in the main newsroom.

The first live broadcast of Sky News HD, on Sky Channel 517, was the channel's election debate, which was held on 22 April 2010. For the 10 days leading up to the debate, channel 517 displayed a countdown clock to launch. The debate was hosted in HD by Kay Burley and Adam Boulton. Following the end of the coverage for the evening, channel 517 moved to show a looping preview tape. The tape included the HD, which were available on Sky Anytime. The loop continued until Sky News HD was launched on the evening of 6 May 2010, coinciding with the coverage of the 2010 general election results, hosted by Adam Boulton.

On 26 July 2010, Sky News HD launched on the OSN Network, broadcasting to the Middle East and Africa.

On 1 January 2015, Sky News HD launched on Virgin Media.

== Sky News Radio ==
Sky News Radio provides news bulletins to radio stations in the United Kingdom and to other English-language radio stations around the world.

In March 2007, BSkyB and Chrysalis Group announced plans to launch a dedicated Sky News Radio station on the proposed bid by Channel 4's 4 Digital Group for the second digital audio broadcasting multiplex in the United Kingdom. However, two months later Chrysalis sold its radio stations to Global Radio, and in October 2007 following a business review Global's chief executive announced that it would be withdrawing from the joint venture.

The Sky News Radio feed is available free-to-air on the Astra 2A satellite at 28.2 East by tuning it manually: 12207.00 V, 27500, 2/3 (Label: SNR).

== Additional channels ==
=== Sky News Raw ===
On 5 February 2019, Sky News launched a pop-up channel called Sky News Raw. It aired with behind-the-scenes programming from 07:00 to 17:00 on channel 523 on Sky TV and online via Sky News' social media channels. The pop-up channel celebrated the 30th anniversary of Sky News, having first broadcast on 5 February 1989.

Robotic cameras were placed around the newsroom and planning rooms at Sky Studios, in the three main television studios at Osterley and Millbank, and in the broadcast galleries. There were also behind-the-scenes features from elsewhere in the newsgathering operation, such as the Sky News helicopter and ENG vehicles.

Sky News Raw logo used in January and February 2019

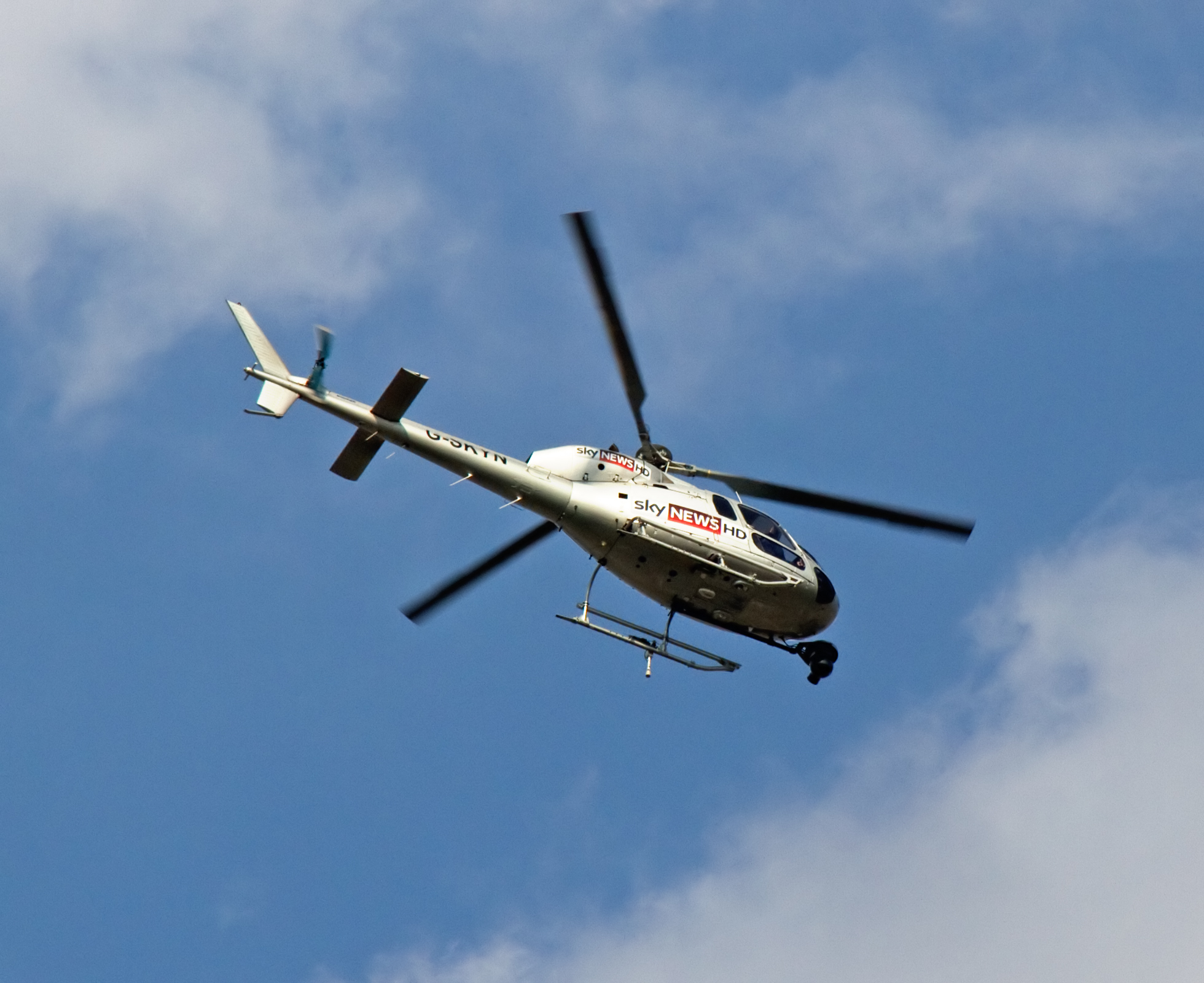
The Sky News Helicopter was featured on the channel.

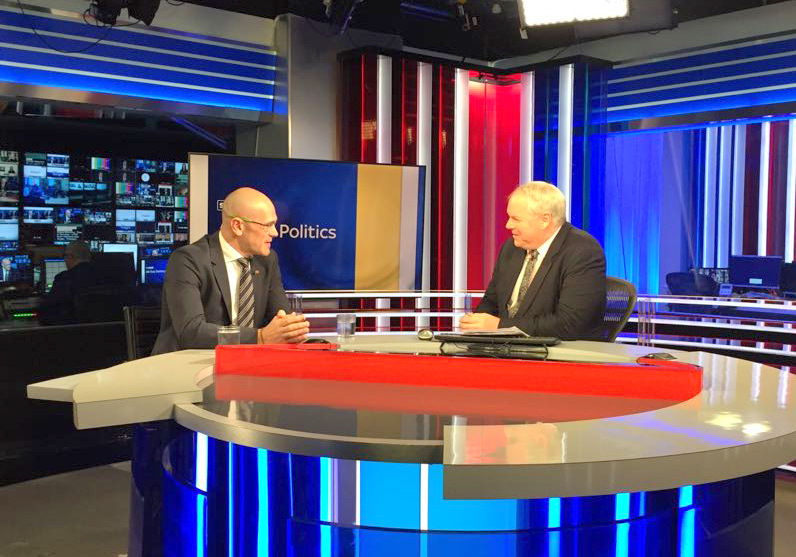
Cameras were also installed in the Millbank studios.

=== Sky News Brexit-Free ===
From 16 October to 1 November 2019, Sky News ran a pop-up channel called Sky News Brexit-Free. The channel aired on weekdays from 17:00 to 22:00 and carried coverage of other news headlines unrelated to the United Kingdom's exit from the European Union. Sky News head John Ryley cited viewer fatigue over the near-constant coverage of Brexit as justification for the channel.

== In-depth series ==
The channel occasionally focuses on specific areas of society and current affairs. Past examples include Inside Iraq, Green Britain and Crime Uncovered.

Pakistan: On Terror's Frontline was shown throughout the week beginning Monday 23 March 2009. A Sky News press release stated:

Over three days, Sky News will explore why Pakistan has become the frontline of terror and ask what the West can do about it. Jeremy Thompson will present live from the capital Islamabad, interviewing key figures across the community.

The series of reports won a 2009 RTS Award for International News Coverage.

== Criticism and perception ==
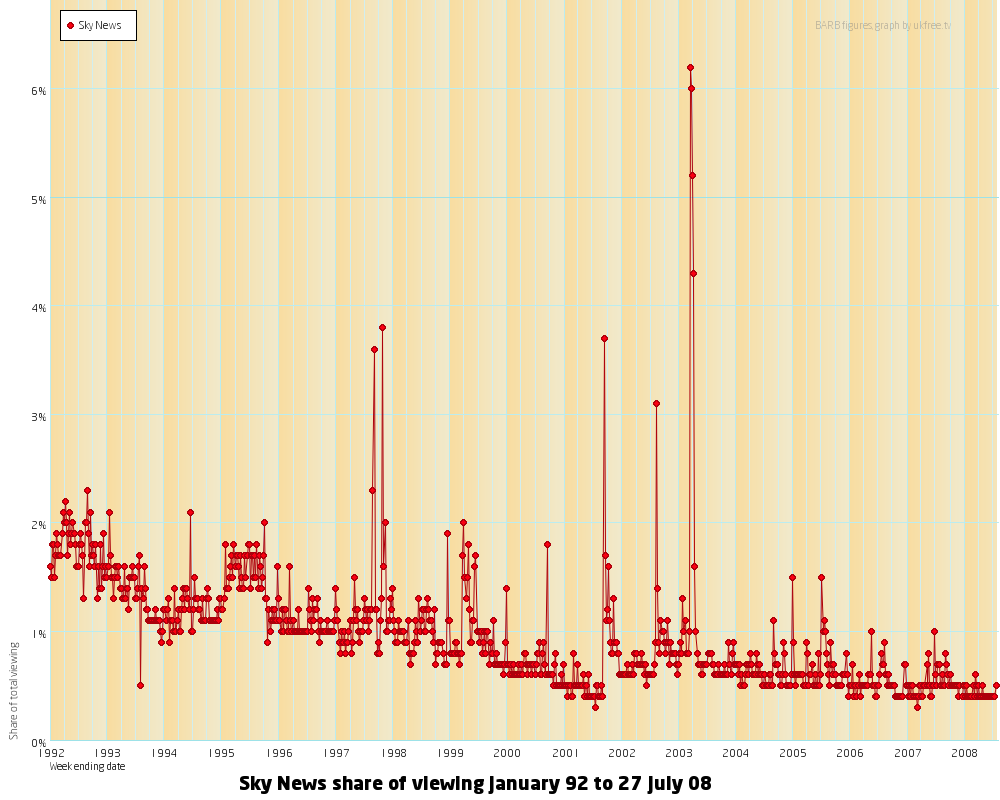
Sky News viewing peaked during major events such as the September 11 attacks, Iraq War, Asian tsunami, 7 July 2005 London bombings and the death of Diana, Princess of Wales but has generally declined to a quarter achieved in 1992–95.

Sky News operates under Ofcom broadcasting regulations which require impartial, unbiased coverage. The channel is viewed by some in the media establishment as an impartial and unbiased provider of news. In November 2005 the then head of BBC News, Peter Horrocks, acknowledged that Sky News remained the first choice for "key opinion formers".

=== Allegations of conservative bias ===
A number of sources observe that Sky News is inherently biased towards conservative views, as throughout the 1990s and 2000s it was minority owned and dominated by Rupert Murdoch's right-leaning News Corporation, and thereafter the Murdoch family's 21st Century Fox. During its 2010 election coverage, the broadcasting regulator Ofcom received 650 complaints about inconsistent treatment of candidates in a leader's debate and pro-Tory bias. In a 2010 article in the New Statesman, the journalist and broadcaster Mehdi Hasan argued that "in style and in substance, of course, it is nothing like the pro-war, pro-Republican, pro-Palin Fox News Channel". As of October 2018, Fox no longer has a stake in the broadcaster.

In early 1994, Kelvin MacKenzie, former editor of The Sun newspaper, was appointed managing director of BSkyB, Sky News's parent company at the time. MacKenzie's proposed changes to Sky News led to clashes with CEO Sam Chisholm and the head of Sky News, Ian Frykberg, who protested what they saw as an attempt to take the channel's news values downmarket. The most ferocious battle occurred when Mackenzie wanted Sky News to run an interview with Lady Bienvenida Buck. Frykberg refused to air the interview and resigned shortly after. The interview was broadcast on Sky One. MacKenzie announced his resignation in August 1994, but not before Sky News transmitted live pictures of the freeway chase of O. J. Simpson's white Bronco on 17 June 1994, bringing US helicopter journalism to the UK.

Ofcom received 652 complaints regarding the network's neutrality after it hosted the second leaders' debate ahead of the 2010 General Election. In May 2010, 832 complaints were received by Ofcom about an interview with electoral reformist David Babbs conducted by Sky News presenter Kay Burley. The interview led to Burley being heckled by protesters while reporting from Westminster, and further protest via a Twitter campaign. Also in May 2010, Ofcom received 696 complaints relating to Sky News's then political editor Adam Boulton's conduct during an interview with Alastair Campbell.

=== Allegations of bias related to Qatari sponsorship ===
Qatar Airways, which is owned by the State of Qatar, sponsored Sky News' prolific weather section from 2005 until 2026, making tens of thousands of appearances on its various services ever since. The relationship has been described as "one of the most comprehensive weather sponsorships in the history of television". A study published by Critical Studies in Mass Communication has examined Sky's coverage of Qatar against two competitors (CNN International and ITV), and found that Sky's coverage was overall more positive towards the Qatari state, but especially so on matters relating to security and terrorism. On allegations of Qatari bribery related to the 2022 FIFA World Cup, Sky News was slightly more negative than competitors (although it was found more likely than CNNI to blame FIFA for the matter, while CNNI placed more of the blame on Qatar). However, on matters related to security, terrorism and "hard power moves", Sky News was found to be significantly more positive on the Qatari government than competitors, focusing on Qatar's role as a mediator in conflict and its positive results, while competitors put much more of a focus on allegations of terrorism funding, and this despite Sky's reputation for leaning more conservative. The study postulated that due to Sky's close relationship with Qatar Airways, it had a strong incentive to distance the Qatari brand from allegations of terrorism, which could reflect negatively on itself, or even cause pressure on it to end the lucrative partnership, while allegations of bribery and matters of soft power didn't pose such risks.

=== Breaches of privacy and insensitivity ===
In 2014, Sky News journalist Colin Brazier rifled through a Malaysia Airlines Flight 17 victim's possessions on live TV. He picked up objects and briefly described what he had before putting them down and saying "we shouldn't really be doing this I suppose, really". 110 complaints were submitted to Ofcom. Sky News stated both Brazier and Sky News "apologise profusely for any offence caused".

Sky News was again embroiled in controversy in October 2014, when crime correspondent Martin Brunt and his camera crew doorstepped Brenda Leyland, who had posted controversial comments concerning the McCann investigation on social media. Following the confrontation Leyland was found dead in a hotel, leading to calls on social media for Brunt to be sacked. During the inquest into Leyland's death, Brunt expressed to the coroner that he was devastated at hearing the news of Leyland's suicide. Following the inquest, Ofcom reported it had received 171 complaints in relation to the case and that it would consider these complaints in light of the coroner's verdict.

In 2015, Kay Burley caused further controversy when, in response to the November 2015 Paris attacks, she tweeted a photograph of a Golden Retriever dog, to which she had added, "Sadness in his eyes #parisattacks".

In February 2023, Sky News faced further criticism over its handling and reporting of missing person Nicola Bulley.

=== Fabrication ===
In April 2003, Sky News carried a report from James Forlong aboard the British nuclear submarine HMS Splendid purportedly showing a live firing of a cruise missile during the Iraq war. The report was a fabrication, with the crew acting along for the benefit of the cameras. The Sky News team did not accompany the submarine when it left port and the scenes were recorded whilst the vessel was docked. The shot of the missile launch had been obtained from stock footage.

The faked report was revealed because another film crew did accompany the vessel to sea, and its footage showed that a modern missile is not launched by a crew member pressing a red button marked with the word "FIRE", as had been portrayed in the Sky News report, but is launched with a left mouse click. When the fabrication was exposed, Forlong and his producer were suspended. The next day, The Guardian reported that Forlong had resigned following an internal investigation. In a follow-up article, The Guardian speculated on the long-term effects on Sky News credibility. In October 2003, Forlong was found dead by his wife after committing suicide. In December, Sky News was fined £50,000 by the Independent Television Commission for breaching accuracy regulations.

In August 2016 Sky News was criticised after allegedly paying €2,000 to a group of Romanians to pretend they were part of an eastern European gang selling guns to terrorists in Syria. The Romanians were arrested by Romanian DIICOT and confessed that they were paid by Sky News journalist Stuart Ramsay to pretend they were gun traffickers. The guns featured in the report were legally owned and were hunting weapons. Sky News has said it stands by the story.

== Legal cases ==
In November 2008 BSkyB paid substantial undisclosed libel damages to Robert Murat in relation to their reporting of the abduction of Madeleine McCann. Sky News had falsely suggested that Murat, who was assisting in the search of McCann, had acted like child murderer Ian Huntley following McCann's disappearance. Sky News also falsely accused Murat of misleading journalists into thinking he was working for the police. An apology was also placed on the Sky News website, the libellous material removed and Murat's costs were paid.

In November 2010 the Attorney General for England and Wales, Dominic Grieve QC, was given the right to launch contempt of court proceedings against Sky News over the broadcaster's alleged breach of a media injunction. It was in relation to the reporting of the story of Paul and Rachel Chandler, a Kent couple who were held captive by Somali pirates for 13 months. The media was blocked from publishing details of the couple's "health and welfare" prior to their being freed on 14 November 2010. Sky claims that it "scrupulously observed the terms of the injunction", but also admitted that it "followed the spirit, if not the letter" of the order. At the time, lawyers representing the Chandlers obtained the court order over fears that their lives could be put in danger by the media reporting their capture. Sky News was alleged to have breached the injunction on the day of their release around from Somalia, leading the Attorney General to seek permission at the High Court to bring contempt proceedings. The Attorney General dropped the case in January 2012; a spokesperson for his office said that continuing with proceedings would no longer be in the public interest.

In March 2013, Sky News journalist Mark Stone and his camera operator were detained in Tiananmen Square live on television, in what he described as a surreal but telling episode about reporting in China. Viewers saw Stone being directed into a police van live from Beijing. A police officer was filmed asking the Sky team to switch off their camera, saying they were now inside the Forbidden City and did not have permission to film there. While they had permission to film in the square, Stone said police told him the team were not displaying their passes correctly.

== Awards ==
Sky News won BAFTA awards for coverage of the 11 September 2001 attacks and the 2002 Soham murders.

Sky News's coverage of the 7 July 2005 London bombings won the 2006 International Emmy for Breaking News award. The coverage was commended as "fast and accurate".

In June 2007, Sky News was named Best News Channel at the Broadcast Digital Channel Awards. It beat several other national and international broadcasters, including Al Jazeera English and the BBC.

The channel won a BAFTA Award in the News Category on 10 May 2015, for Alex Crawford's coverage of the 2014 Ebola crisis.

In 2018, Sky News was named Royal Television Society News Channel of the Year, the eleventh time the channel had won the award.

Sky News won a BAFTA Award in the News Category on 13 May 2018 for "The Rohingya Crisis". Special Correspondent Alex Crawford, cameraman Martin Smith and producer Neville Lazarus travelled into Myanmar to bring a first-hand report of what was happening in Rakhine State. The same programme also won an International Emmy Award for News in October 2018.

== Sponsorship ==
In November 2014, Sky News sponsored the Young Person in Business category of the National Chamber Awards. It was won by Oliver Bryssau of Origin Broadband, which was named Business of the Year.

== Online ==
news.sky.com is the channel's main Web site. It provides news, sport, weather, showbiz, and business stories.

In 2009, the Web site changed to bring it in line with the on-screen look of Sky News. The site made use of Flash Video encoding to match the visual style of the TV channel with pictures and breaking news. The site underwent a further refresh in 2012, when both the look of the pages and the content management system were updated.

In 2021, to bring the Web site in line with the new Sky News branding on-screen minor tweaks were made such as font updates and updated breaking news graphics.

== Virgin Media dispute ==
On 1 March 2007, Sky's agreement to provide its basic channels (including Sky News) to Virgin Media expired. At midnight, Sky News was removed and the EPG entry for the channel was changed to "Sky Snooze Try BBC" until Sir Richard Branson demanded the message be removed, saying: "I have asked them to take it down. We do not mean any disrespect to Sky News. I think it is a very good news channel."

Sky News, and the other Sky channels that had been removed, reappeared on Virgin Media on 13 November 2008.

== Audience figures ==
The Daily Telegraph reported in November 2021, "Sky's top performing shows, including Trevor Phillips on Sunday, average around 160,000 viewers".

In the period from 22 November 2022 to 21 December 2022, Sky News averaged 52,230 each day for its prime-time audience (between 7pm and 11pm). Its all-day average was 53,350.

== Organisation ==
=== Budget ===
As of 2018, Sky News had an estimated £90 million annual budget, employs about 500 staff, but it makes a loss of between £15 million and £20 million a year, according to The Guardian.

=== Bureaux and studios ===
Sky News has bureaux across the world; some are operated in conjunction with other media outlets.

United Kingdom

- Osterley, London, England (Sky Group's headquarters)
- City of Westminster, London, England
- Belfast, Northern Ireland
- Birmingham, England
- Bristol, England
- Edinburgh, Scotland
- Manchester, England
- London, England (NBC News’ London Bureau)

Bureaux

- Abu Dhabi, UAE (with Sky News Arabia)
- Beijing, China
- Brussels, Belgium
- Dubai, UAE
- Dublin, Ireland
- Jerusalem, Israel
- Johannesburg, South Africa
- Melbourne, Australia (with News24)
- Moscow, Russia (with NTV)
- New Delhi, India (with WION and Zee Live)
- New York City, U.S. (with NBC News)
- Sydney, Australia (with Sky News Australia)
- Washington, D.C., U.S. (with NBC News)

Additional live studios

- Auckland, New Zealand (with News24 New Zealand)
- Adelaide, Australia (with News24)
- Brisbane, Australia (with News24)
- Canberra, Australia (with News24)
- Los Angeles, U.S. (with NBC News)
- Milan, Italy (with Sky TG24)
- Perth, Australia (with News24)
- Rome, Italy (with Sky TG24)
