= List of scandals in British journalism =

There have been a number of scandals in British journalism during the 21st century, both in printed publications and in broadcast media. The publicised scandals include faking information, and suppressing information, as well as gaining illegal access to private data. As in many other countries, some British media have been accused of trying to inflate the prices of some shares or commodities.

Generally, the people and organisations involved have not been severely penalised by the British government, with only a few people serving short prison sentences. The British government did initiate the Leveson Inquiry into the conduct of the British media, but subsequent governments did not implemented all the recommendations of the long running public inquiry.

With the explosion of digital media on the Internet, the monitoring and policing of media has become more complex.

== Financial scams ==
=== City Slickers, Daily Mirror (1999–2000) ===
Two financial journalists working on the City Slickers section of the Daily Mirror were convicted in 2005 for buying, tipping and then selling shares between 1999 and 2000, breaching the Financial Services Act. Investigations revealed James Hipwell and Anil Bhoyrul made at least £41,000 from those wrongdoings. The investigation also revealed that Piers Morgan, editor of the newspaper, actually encouraged this behaviour. James Hipwell and Anil Bhoyrul were fired from the Daily Mirror in 2000.

== International conflicts ==
=== James Forlong, Sky News (2003) ===
In April 2003, the Sky News TV network carried a report from James Forlong aboard the British nuclear submarine HMS Splendid, purportedly showing the live firing of a cruise missile at sea in the Persian Gulf during the Iraq War. The report included scenes of the crew members giving instructions related to the launch of the missile, and included a sequence in which a crew member pressed a large red button marked with the word "FIRE", accompanied by a sequence of a missile breaking the surface of the water and launching into the air. The report was a fabrication, with the crew acting along for the benefit of the cameras. The Sky News team did not accompany the submarine when it left port, and the scenes were actually recorded whilst the vessel was docked. The shot of the missile breaking the surface had been obtained from stock footage.

The faked report was revealed because a BBC film crew did accompany the vessel to sea. The BBC crew filmed a real cruise missile launch for the BBC TV series Fighting the War. The BBC footage showed how, with modern computerised launching systems, a missile is not launched by pressing a red button, but is actually launched with a left mouse click. Following the BBC's accusations, Forlong and his producer were suspended; the next day, The Guardian reported that Forlong had resigned following an internal investigation.

In a follow-up article, The Guardian's Matt Wells speculated on the fake's long-term effects on Sky News's credibility. In October 2003, Forlong was found dead by his wife, having committed suicide. In December, Sky News was fined £50,000 by the Independent Television Commission for breaching accuracy regulations.

=== Adnan Hajj, Reuters (2006) ===
Reuters pulled 920 photographs of the 2006 Israel-Lebanon conflict from freelance photographer Adnan Hajj in August 2006, after it was exposed that several high-profile photographs had been altered heavily in Adobe Photoshop; see Adnan Hajj photographs controversy. The manipulations exaggerated the damage done by Israeli bombing.

Reuters "killed" the 'photograph' and admitted that the photographer had altered it, saying "photo editing software was improperly used on this image. A corrected version will immediately follow this advisory. We are sorry for any inconvenience." Moira Whittle, Reuters' Head of PR, said: "Reuters takes such matters extremely seriously as it is strictly against company editorial policy to alter pictures."

=== Stuart Ramsay, Sky News (2016) ===
Sky News's Chief Correspondent, Stuart Ramsay, was accused by the Romanian authorities of faking a TV report in which alleged gun traffickers were filmed near the Romanian-Ukrainian border saying that they were willing to sell weapons to the highest bidder, including terrorists. The Romanian Directorate for Investigating Organized Crime and Terrorism (Direcţia de Investigare a Infracţiunilor de Criminalitate Organizată şi Terorism, DIICOT) quickly arrested the alleged gun traffickers from the TV report; it concluded that they were authorized hunters and the rifles seen in the report were also registered semi-automatic weapons. Sky News and Stuart Ramsay stuck to the original story, claiming the footage was real and that the gun traffickers did operate near the Romanian-Ukrainian border. All the individuals involved in the filming of the TV report, including Ramsay, are now under investigation by DIICOT.

The Romanian Prime Minister Dacian Cioloș criticized the TV report, claiming it to be inadmissible.

== Spying techniques ==
=== Phone hacking, News of the World (2006–) ===
In 2006, a UK tabloid newspaper phone-hacking scandal arose involving the defunct News of the World newspaper and other British titles published by News International, a subsidiary of Rupert Murdoch's News Corp. Reporters and managers working at the newspapers were accused of 'hacking' the phone voicemail inboxes of celebrities, notable public figures (such as the British Royal Family), and even the victims of crimes (including Milly Dowler) and their families, in order to gather material for stories. There were also allegations of police bribery and other misdemeanours.

The resulting public outcry led to several high-profile resignations. Advertiser boycotts led to the News of the World being shuttered, publishing its final edition on 10 July 2011, after 168 years of publication. News Corporation was also to cancel its proposed takeover of the British satellite broadcaster BSkyB. The then prime minister, David Cameron, announced a public inquiry would look into the complaints made against the News of the World. This became known as the Leveson Inquiry, after the judge presiding over it, Lord Justice Leveson. A number of arrests and convictions followed, most notably that of the former News of the World managing editor Andy Coulson and Rebekah Brooks.

== Cover-ups ==
=== Jimmy Savile sexual abuse scandal ===
In September and October 2012, almost a year after his death, claims were widely publicised that Jimmy Savile had committed sexual abuse, his alleged victims ranging from prepubescent girls and boys to adults. The investigations undertaken jointly by the police and the National Society for the Prevention of Cruelty to Children (NSPCC), Giving Victims a Voice reported allegations covering a period of fifty years, including 214 alleged acts by Savile which, though uncorroborated, have been formally recorded as crimes, some involving children as young as eight. The report states "within the recorded crimes there are 126 indecent acts and 34 rape/penetration offences."

After his death on 29 October 2011, Meirion Jones and Liz MacKean from the BBC programme Newsnight began to investigate reports that he had sexually abused children. They found evidence to support the allegations. The Newsnight report was scheduled for broadcast on BBC on 7 December 2011, but a decision was taken to cancel its transmission, which ultimately developed into a major crisis for the BBC when the ITV documentary was screened in October 2012. The subsequent Pollard Review found that Jones and MacKean assembled cogent evidence that Savile had a history of abusing young women, and Newsnight was in a position to break the story in 2011. A Newsnight spokesman said, "Any suggestion that a story was dropped for anything other than editorial reasons is completely untrue."

== British Journalism Awards ==
In 2012, the British Journalism Awards was created by UK media magazine Press Gazette in response to the latest scandals and to value great contributions to journalism.
