= Mark Campbell =

Mark or Marc Campbell may refer to:

- Mark Campbell (defensive tackle) (born 1972), American football player
- Mark Campbell (tight end) (born 1975), American football player
- Mark Campbell (footballer) (born 1978), Scottish footballer
- Mark Campbell (political consultant), former college administrator and former Republican political strategist
- Mark Mitchell Campbell (1897–1963), barnstormer and stuntman
- Mark Campbell (librettist), librettist
- Mark Campbell (basketball), American basketball coach
- Mark V. Campbell (born 1978), Canadian academic, disc jockey and writer
- Marc Campbell (1884–1946), shortstop in Major League Baseball
- Marc Campbell, lead singer and guitarist for The Nails
- Marc Campbell (guitarist), American guitarist and member of Misterwives

== See also ==
- Marcus Campbell (disambiguation)
