= Kaufman Astoria Studios =

Film studio in Queens, New York

- Paramount Studios Complex
- U.S. National Register of Historic Places
- U.S. Historic district
- New York City Landmark
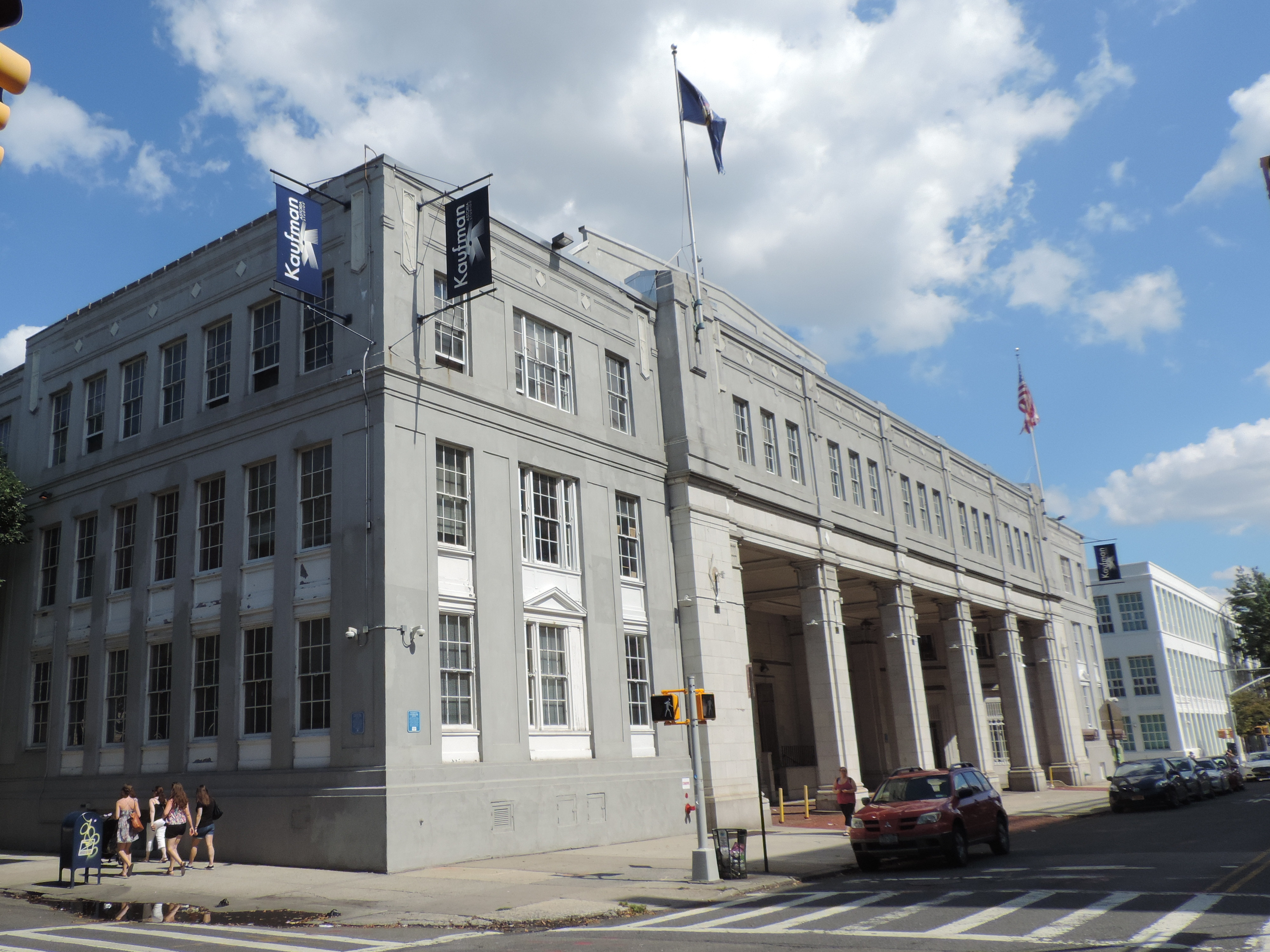
- Kaufman Astoria Studios
- Location: 35th Ave., 35th, 36th, and 37th Sts., Astoria, Queens, New York City
- Coordinates: 40°45′24″N 73°55′29″W
- Area: 5 acres (2 ha)
- Built: 1921
- Architect: Multiple
- NRHP reference No.: 78001897
- NYCL No.: 0977

Significant dates
- Added to NRHP: November 14, 1978
- Designated NYCL: March 14, 1978

The Kaufman Astoria Studios, known historically as the Paramount Studios Complex, is a film studio located in the Astoria neighborhood of Queens in New York City. The studio was constructed for Famous Players–Lasky in 1920, since it was close to Manhattan's Theater District. The property was taken over by real estate developer George S. Kaufman in 1982 and renamed Kaufman Astoria Studios.

The studio is home to New York City's only backlot, which opened in December 2013. The property was designated a national historic district and added to the National Register of Historic Places in 1978.

== History ==
=== 20th century ===
The studio was originally constructed for Famous Players–Lasky in 1920 to provide the company with a facility close to the Broadway theater district. Many features and short subjects were filmed there between 1920 and 1933. W. C. Fields made his silent features there. The first Sherlock Holmes sound film, The Return of Sherlock Holmes (also 1929), was made at the studio by the British producer Basil Dean. The first two films featuring the Marx Brothers, The Cocoanuts (1929) and Animal Crackers (1930), were shot at the Astoria Studio.

Paramount used the Astoria studio heavily in the early years of talking pictures, primarily for short subjects starring New York-based stage and radio performers: Burns and Allen, Eddie Cantor, Tom Howard, Ethel Merman, Rudy Vallee, Lillian Roth, and many others. During this period the studio facility was known as the Paramount Studio.

In 1932, after Paramount Pictures moved all studio operations to California, the Astoria location was turned over to independent producers, including Walter Wanger, whose films were released through Paramount or other Hollywood film companies. All the films starring tango icon Carlos Gardel made in the United States were shot at Astoria Studios. Gloria Swanson cites the studio as, "the studio where I'd been making all of my pictures since 1923" in her autobiography Swanson on Swanson. In 1938, ...One Third of a Nation... was the last feature film to be shot there during that era.

Educational Pictures rented space at the facility during the 1930s, until Educational closed its doors in 1938. The last theatrical films produced at Astoria were a series of short Robert Benchley comedies released by Paramount between 1940 and 1942.

In 1942, the United States Army Signal Corps Army Pictorial Service took over the studio for the making of Army training films until 1971, including The Big Picture, shown on American network television and later in syndication.

In 1975, the studio opened again for shooting on Thieves and also The Next Man. The studio became dormant again but in January 1977, the General Services Administration of the US Government handed the studio over to New York City to be operated by a non-profit organization (the newly formed Astoria Motion Picture and Television Center Foundation) initially at no cost for a year and it reopened for filming of The Wiz in 1977.

In 1978, the property was designated a national historic district and added to the National Register of Historic Places. The district encompasses six contributing buildings.

In 1981, New York City received an Urban Development Action Grant from the federal government for the renovation and expansion of the studio which Kenneth Schuman, NYC Commissioner for Economic Development, described as being of "compelling public interest".

In 1982, the property was taken over by real estate developer George S. Kaufman and renamed Kaufman Astoria Studios.

=== 21st century ===
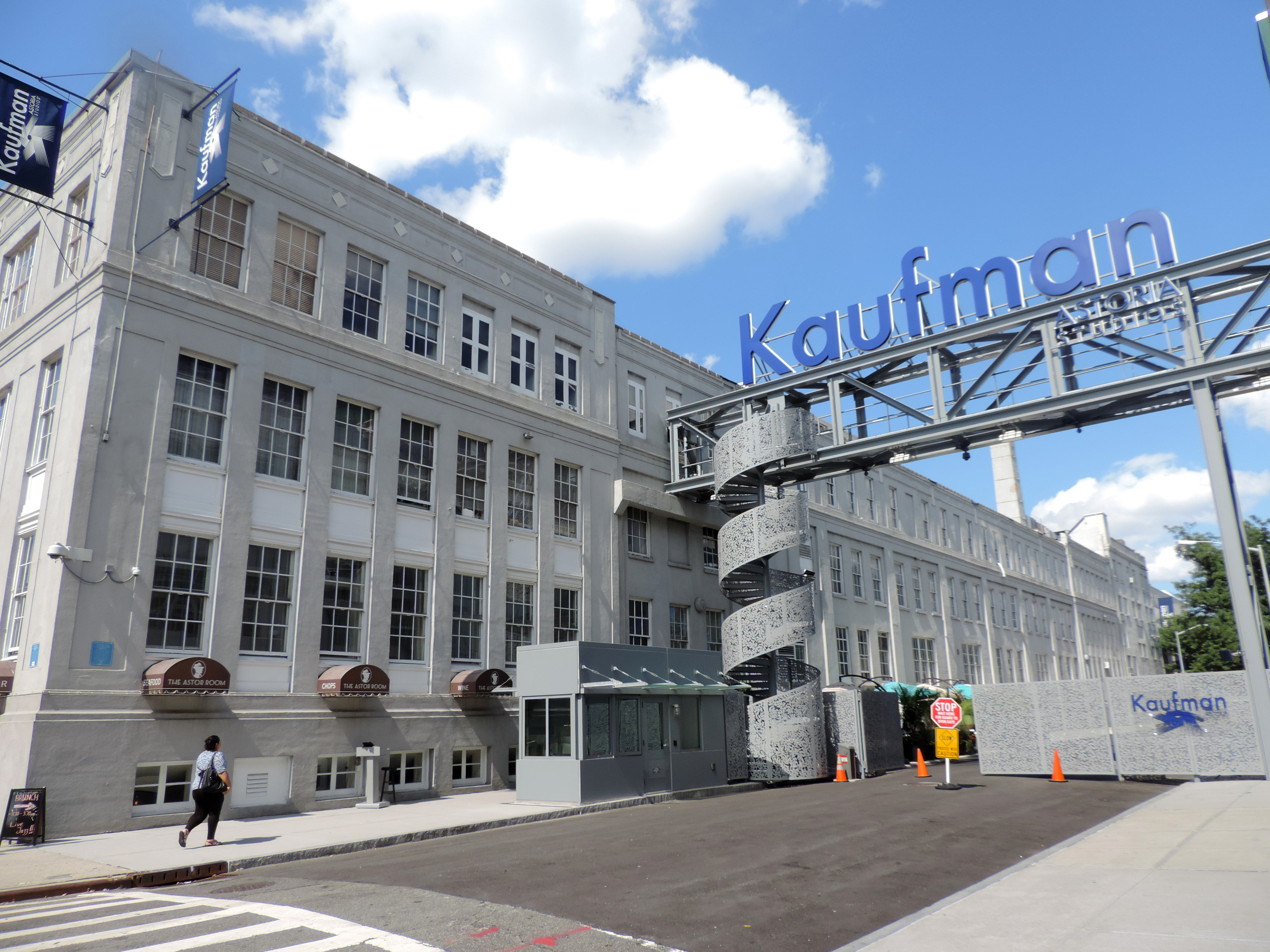
The former 36th Street, gated as a back lot since 2013

Kaufman Astoria Studios has seven sound stages including the new Stage K, designed by the Janson Design Group.

In 2008, Martin P. Robinson, who plays Mr. Snuffleupagus, Telly Monster, and Slimey the Worm on Sesame Street, married Annie Evans, a writer for the show on the Sesame Street set. The ceremony was performed on the steps of 123 Sesame Street and the reception was held throughout the rest of the set.

In February 2013, the studio announced plans to close off one block of 36th Street to make it into a backlot. Work on the backlot started that July, and the 34,800-square-foot (3,230 m^{2}) backlot was dedicated on December 3, 2013, becoming the only studio backlot in New York City. In 2014, Kaufman Astoria Studios announced plans to build a new 18,000-square-foot soundstage on its Astoria campus within two years.

In 2020, Kaufman Astoria Studios announced a five-block redevelopment project around the studio, in conjunction with Larry Silverstein, Bedrock Real Estate, and ODA Architecture. The area would be called Innovation QNS and stretch from 37th to 43rd Streets from 35th to 36th Avenues. The project, to cost $2 billion, would add 2,700 residential units, 200,000 square feet (19,000 m^{2}) for shops and restaurants, and 250,000 square feet (23,000 m^{2}) for creative industries. Construction was planned to begin in 2023. In 2022, the New York City Council approved the Innovation QNS project, although local activists had opposed the plans. Construction was delayed in part because of the expiration of the 421-a tax exemption and the 2023 Writers Guild of America strike. Two of the buildings in the Innovation QNS site were sold in early 2025, and the project was canceled that August due to industry and tax-policy uncertainty. Deutsche Bank, which held a mortgage loan on Kaufman Astoria Studios, sought to foreclose on the property by 2026.

In 2026, Shadowbox Studios was appointed as studio operator and currently manages the facility.

== Notable productions ==
Motion pictures filmed there include the musicals Hair and The Wiz, and the films Goodfellas, The Money Pit, and Carlito's Way. In 1984, The Jacksons' music video "Torture" was filmed there as well. Many sequences, especially the 'visitation' sequence in 2002 TV mini series Angels in America, were also shot there. A 2009 remake, The Taking of Pelham 1 2 3, also used the studios. In 2011, the remake of Arthur filmed a few scenes there. Other notable films that have used the studio include The Devil Wears Prada and its sequel, Scent of a Woman, Glengarry Glen Ross, Birdman, All That Jazz, We Own the Night, Ishtar, The Age of Innocence, The Pink Panther, Presumed Innocent, The Bourne Ultimatum, Going in Style, Men In Black 3, and many films by Sidney Lumet and Woody Allen, whose film Shadows and Fog included a 26,000-square-foot (2,400 m^{2}) set at the studio, one of the biggest in New York at the time.

Television shows filmed at the studio include Sesame Street, Succession, Orange Is The New Black, Onion News Network, Johnny and the Sprites, Bear in the Big Blue House, Nurse Jackie, Between the Lions, The Wubbulous World of Dr. Seuss, The OA, Your Friends & Neighbors, Oobi, Where in the World Is Carmen Sandiego, and its successor Where in Time is Carmen Sandiego? Other projects recorded at the studios have included Judge Judy, Power of 10, The Cosby Show, Cosby, The Days and Nights of Molly Dodd, Swans Crossing, Law & Order, Million Dollar Password, the 2009 pilot of The $1,000,000 Pyramid, Video Power, Spin City, Generation Gap and Mariah Carey's MTV Unplugged. WFAN, a local sports radio station owned by Audacy, was formerly based at the studio before moving to lower Manhattan in the fall of 2009.

=== Performers' images ===
The walls of the studio are lined with signed images of the performers who have worked in the studios, including Milton Berle, Frank Sinatra, The Marx Brothers, Ginger Rogers, George Burns, Lena Horne, Ethel Merman, Paul Robeson, Lillian Gish, Claudette Colbert, Gloria Swanson, Maurice Chevalier, Jeanette MacDonald, Diana Ross, and Jerry Orbach.
