= Marcus Campbell (disambiguation) =

Marcus Campbell is a Scottish snooker player.

Marcus Campbell may also refer to:

- Marcus Beach Campbell (1866–1944), American judge
- Marcus Campbell (basketball) (born 1982), American basketball player
- Marcus Campbell, the first playable character and unofficial protagonist in the video game State of Decay

== See also ==
- Marc Campbell (1884–1946), baseball player
- Mark Campbell (disambiguation)
