= USC Center for the Political Future =

American political science organization

The USC Center for the Political Future, formerly known as the USC Institute of Politics and Government, is a nonpartisan extracurricular program housed in the University of Southern California's Dornsife College of Liberal Arts and Sciences.

The center was established in order to combat uncivil political discourse and promote bipartisan, fact-based dialogue on national issues. The Center for the Political Future hosts conferences, offers a Fellows program, hosts an ongoing dialogue series called Political Conversations as well as other speaker events, and provides a neutral ground for political discourse in "off-the-record policy workshops" with top experts from relevant disciplines, among other programs.

Through its dialogue series, conferences, fellows program, and workshops, the center has expressed that some of its goals are to "understand and contextualize causes of the political divide" in the United States, "work toward a common fact base," "renew civil discourse to find common ground," and assess the possible "domestic and global implications of different policy approaches" through civil discourse between experts across the ideological spectrum.

== About the center ==
=== Leadership ===
The center's director is Robert Shrum and its co-director is Mike Murphy. Shrum is a longtime Democratic strategist and speechwriter for politicians, including Ted Kennedy, Bill Clinton, Al Gore, and John Kerry. Murphy is a veteran Republican campaign strategist and has worked for candidates Arnold Schwarzenegger, Jeb Bush, John McCain, and Mitt Romney. The center's Executive Director is Kamy Akhavan, former CEO of ProCon.org.

=== Mission ===
The Center for the Political Future brings political professionals together from both sides of the aisle and models bipartisan discussions for students and the national political stage.

The center's stated mission is to “combine intellectual inquiry, teaching, and practical politics to advance civil dialogue that transcends partisan divisions and explores solutions to our most pressing national and global challenges.”

=== Objectives ===
The Center for the Political Future outlines several objectives, including:

- "Develop a deep understanding of pressing national and global issues and how policy is made at the national and global levels.
- Study and understand the psychological and intellectual scaffold on which conservatives and liberals operate in order to develop more inclusive frameworks for debate and decision making.
- Model and advance civil dialogue demonstrating that individuals with different political perspectives can speak respectfully with each other and find ways to work together.
- Prepare students to become effective citizens by teaching and practicing the skills of practical political leadership."

=== History ===
In 1978, before it was called the Center for the Political Future, USC founded the USC Institute of Politics and Government. A little more than a decade later, in 1987, it was renamed the Jesse M. Unruh Institute of Politics after the late California state politician, Jesse M. Unruh. In 2018, long-time political strategists and friends Robert Shrum (D) and Mike Murphy (R) expanded the Unruh Institute of Politics by creating the Center for the Political Future.

== Programs and initiatives ==
The center has several departments and initiatives that further its mission: the Unruh Institute of Politics, the USC Dornsife Poll, programming through their Political Conversations series as well as other speaker events, a Fellows Program, and large-scale conferences.

=== Unruh Institute of Politics ===
The Jesse M. Unruh Institute of Politics, named after long-time California politician Jesse M. Unruh, is a component of the Center for the Political Future. Its focus is on engaging students at USC in politics and public service. It achieves this goal by providing students with internships and practical experiences in politics.

Student programs include immersive professional experiences at the Iowa Caucuses, in California state politics in Sacramento, a leadership conference for LA-based high school women, and related coursework in these areas. The Center also provides scholarships to make these experiences more accessible to students.

The Unruh Institute has two affiliated student groups, VoteSC, and USC Political Union. Both organizations promote student engagement in voting and politics.

=== USC Dornsife poll ===
The USC Dornsife poll is maintained by USC’s Center for Economic and Social Research and conducted in partnership with the Center for the Political Future. The purpose of the probability-based online panel is to track respondents changing attitudes and preferences for political candidates over time.

=== Political Conversations ===
The Center for the Political Future hosts a conversation series called Political Conversations. The Center brings in guests from the world of politics, journalism, and other related fields to expose students to practitioners in journalism, politics, and public policy. The Center also hosts other speakers for book talks and professional development events.

Past guests include:

- Shannon Watts - Founder of Moms Demand Action
- Karen Bass - Mayor of Los Angeles.
- Ron Klain - Former White House Chief of Staff under President Biden.
- Joe Manchin - Former United States Senator
- Nancy Pelosi – Speaker of the U.S. House of Representatives
- David Axelrod – Senior Advisor to President Obama, CNN Contributor
- Donna Brazile – Former Chairperson of the Democratic National Committee, former Campaign Manager for Al Gore
- Gray Davis – Former Governor of California
- Pedro Sanchez – Prime Minister of Spain
- Joe Kennedy III – Congressman (D-MA)
- Ron Brownstein – Senior Editor at The Atlantic, Senior Political Analyst at CNN
- Dee Dee Myers – Former White House Press Secretary
- Antonio Villaraigosa – Former Mayor of Los Angeles
- Anthony Scaramucci – Former White House Communications Director
- Rosa DeLauro – Congresswoman (D-CT)
- David Keene – Former President of the NRA and Opinion Editor at the Washington Times

=== Conferences ===
The Center for the Political Future conducts several annual conferences. The two main conferences hosted by the center are the Warschaw Conference on Practical Politics and the Climate Forward Conference.The conference themes range from climate change and political tribalism to immigration and elections.

Featured speakers have included:

- John Kerry – Former Secretary of State
- Mark Sanford – Former Governor and Congressman (R-SC)
- Ana Kasparian – Host of the Young Turks
- Eric Garcetti – Mayor of Los Angeles
- Gordon Brown – Former Prime Minister of the United Kingdom
- Barbara Boxer – Former U.S. Senator (D-CA)
- Symone Sanders – Senior Advisor to Joe Biden
- Joel Benenson – Pollster for Presidents Barack Obama and Bill Clinton and Secretary of State Hillary Clinton
- Ron Klain – Chief of Staff to Vice Presidents Joe Biden and Al Gore
- Steven Schmidt – Senior Advisor to John McCain
- Ron Christie – Former Special Assistant to President George W. Bush and Vice President Dick Cheney

=== Other events ===
Besides speaker events and conferences, the Center also hosts debates, both between USC groups and California candidates for public office. On January 22, 2024, the Center hosted the first debate between California senate candidates. On March 22, 2022, the Center for the Political Future partnered with Fox11 and the Los Angeles Times to sponsor the Los Angeles Mayoral debate, held at USC's Bovard Auditorium. The Center also hosts a debate every semester between the Trojan Democrats and the USC College Republicans.

=== Fellows program ===
The Center for the Political Future hosts visiting Fellows each semester to lead study groups pertaining to politics, public policy, and journalism.

=== 2026 Fellows ===
Semester	Fellow	Notability	Sources
Spring	Mark Campbell	Republican political strategists; CEO of Intellz	
Spring	Yemisi Egbewole	Former Chief of Staff and Advisor to the Biden White House Press Office; Founder of Podium Strategies	
Spring	Garret Graves	Former Congressman representing Louisiana; Former Chairman of the Louisiana Coastal Protection and Restoration Authority	
Spring	Seema Mehta	Veteran political journalist for the Los Angeles Times	

=== 2025 Fellows ===
Semester	Fellow	Notability	Sources
Spring	Cameron Trimble	Former White House Director of Digital Engagement; founder of Hip-Politics	
Spring	Anthony Rendon	Former Speaker of the California State Assembly; served multiple terms as a California Assemblymember	
Spring	Jessica Millan Patterson	Former Chair of the California Republican Party; first woman, Latina, and millennial to lead the party in the state	
Spring	Jonathan Martin	Senior political correspondent and analyst at Politico	
Spring	Betsy Fischer Martin	Executive Director of the Women & Politics Institute at American University; Emmy award winning journalist	
Spring	Ed Goeas	Founder and President/CEO of the Tarrance Group	
Fall	Helen Torres	CEO of Hispanas Organized for Political Equality (HOPE)	
Fall	David Simas	Former President of the Obama Foundation; senior executive at Emerson Collective	
Fall	April Ryan	White House Correspondent and political journalist	
Fall	Frank Lavin	Former U.S. Ambassador to Singapore and Under Secretary of Commerce for International Trade of United States of America	
Fall	Jim DeBoo	Former Chief of Staff to California Governor Gavin Newsom; founder of DeBoo Strategic Affairs.	

=== 2024 Fellows ===
Semester	Fellow	Notability	Sources
Spring	Shannon Watts	Founder Emerita of Moms Demand Action, a leading U.S. gun violence prevention organization; author	
Spring	Michael Tubbs	Former Mayor of Stockton, California; Special Advisor to California Governor Gavin Newsom on Economic Mobility & Opportunity	
Spring	Tim Miller	Political strategist, writer, and media commentator	
Spring	Ron Galperin	Former Los Angeles City Controller	
Spring	Douglas Brinkley	Historian and professor of history at Rice University	
Fall	Carissa Smith	Former Senior Advisor in the White House Office of Public Engagement	
Fall	Lea Endres	Co-founder and CEO of NationBuilder	
Fall	Mike Bonin	Former member of the Los Angeles City Council (11th District)	
Fall	Jeff Blattner	Former Deputy Assistant Attorney General at the U.S. Department of Justice	

=== 2023 Fellows ===
Semester	Fellow	Notability	Sources
Spring	Hank Plante	Veteran television reporter and columnist; Emmy- and Peabody-award winner; longtime political correspondent for KPIX-TV in San Francisco	
Spring	John McConnell	Political communications consultant; former White House speechwriter and aide	
Spring	Martha Escutia	Former California State Senator and Assembly Member; served as Vice President for Government Relations at the University of Southern California	
Spring	Bill Carrick	Democratic political consultant and strategist; longtime advisor to Dick Gephardt and California leaders including Eric Garcetti	
Spring	Michael D. Bishop	Former U.S. Representative from Michigan; served on House Judiciary, Ways and Means, and Higher Education committees	
Fall	Betty Yee	Former California State Controller (2015–2023); also served on the California State Board of Equalization	
Fall	Mike Schmuhl	Former Chair of the Indiana Democratic Party; campaign manager for Pete Buttigieg’s 2020 presidential campaign	
Fall	Reince Priebus	Former White House Chief of Staff and longtime Republican strategist; also Chairman of the Republican National Committee	
Fall	Arnon Mishkin	Political analyst and pollster; Director of the Fox News Election Decision Desk	
Fall	Addisu Demissie	Founding Principal of 50+1 Strategies, political strategist; served as campaign manager for Cory Booker’s 2013 U.S. Senate race and senior advisor for Joe Biden’s 2020 presidential campaign	

=== 2022 Fellows ===
Semester	Fellow	Notability	Sources
Spring	Ralph Neas	Former Executive Director of the Leadership Conference on Civil and Human Rights	
Spring	Amy Turk	CEO of the Downtown Women’s Center	
Fall	Elan Carr	Former U.S. Special Envoy to Monitor & Combat Anti-Semitism; prosecutor, military officer, diplomat; former CEO of the Israeli American Council	
Fall	Noelia Rodriguez	Press Secretary and Deputy Mayor under Los Angeles Mayor Richard Riordan; directed communications for First Lady Laura Bush	
Fall	Jessica Lall	Managing Director of CBRE in Downtown Los Angeles; former President & CEO of Central City Association; candidate for 2022 Los Angeles mayoral election	
Fall	Maria Salinas	President & CEO of the Los Angeles Area Chamber of Commerce (largest business association in LA County)	

=== 2021 Fellows ===
Semester	Fellow	Notability	Sources
Spring	Barbara Comstock	Former U.S. Representative from Virginia’s 10th congressional district (2015–2019); Senior Advisor at Baker Donelson on public policy and government affairs	
Spring	Shaniqua McClendon	Vice President of Political Strategy at Crooked Media	
Fall	Nichol Whiteman	CEO of the Los Angeles Dodgers Foundation	
Fall	Gloria Molina	First Chicana elected to the California State Assembly; longtime Los Angeles County Supervisor	

=== 2020 Fellows ===
Semester	Fellow	Notability	Sources
Spring	Ben Rhodes	Former Deputy National Security Advisor under Barack Obama; co-host of Pod Save the World; author of The World As It Is	
Spring	David Hill	Director of Hill Research Consultants	
Spring	Jeff Greenfield	Television journalist and political analyst	
Fall	Barbara Boxer	Former U.S. Senator from California; chaired key Senate committees including Environment and Public Works	
Fall	John Chiang	Former State Treasurer (2015-2019), former State Controller	
Fall	Mimi Walters	Former United States House of Representatives for California’s 45th district; served in state legislature and local government; committee member for House Energy & Commerce	

=== 2019 Fellows ===
Semester	Fellow	Notability	Sources
Spring	Douglas Schoen	Founding partner of Penn, Schoen & Berland	
Spring	Symone D. Sanders	Former national press secretary for Bernie Sanders (2016), senior adviser to Joe Biden's 2020 campaign and later chief spokesperson/senior advisor for Vice President Kamala Harris; MSNBC host and co-anchor	
Spring	Mike Madrid	Principal at Grassroots Lab; co-founder of The Lincoln Project	
Fall	Patrick Griffin	Founding Partner and CEO of Merrimack Potomac + Charles (MP+C)	
Fall	Adam Nagourney	Los Angeles bureau chief and national political reporter for The New York Times	
Fall	Ann Klenk	Longtime Senior Producer / Co-Executive Producer on Hardball with Chris Matthews (MSNBC)	
Fall	Ron Christie	Founder & CEO of Christie Strategies LLC; former Special Assistant to President George W. Bush	

=== 2018 Fellows ===
Semester	Fellow	Notability	Sources
Spring	Dan Schwerin	Collaborator on Hard Choices and What Happened, speechwriter for Hillary Clinton, founder of Evergreen Strategy Group	
Spring	Gentry Collins	Co-founder of Bright Future Iowa, CEO of American Free Enterprise, Former RNC National Political Director, Former Executive Director for the Republican Party of Iowa	

=== Returning fellows ===
Semester	Fellow	Notability	Sources
Fall 2024 and Spring 2024	Jane Coaston	Political journalist and CNN contributor; former host of 'The Argument' podcast for The New York Times	
Spring 2023 and Fall 2022	Ira Reiner	Los Angeles County District Attorney (1984–1992); also served as LA City Attorney and Controller	
Spring 2022 and Spring 2021	Todd S. Purdum	Former staff writer for The Atlantic (California Correspondent), senior writer at Politico, contributing editor at Vanity Fair, and longtime correspondent for The New York Times	
