= The World as It Is =

The World as It Is may refer to:

- "The World as It Is" (song) by Daryl Braithwaite
- The World as It Is (book) by Ben Rhodes
- The World As It Is: Dispatches on the Myth of Human Progress, book by Chris Hedges

== See also ==
- The World as It Is Today, album by Art Bears
- The World as I See It (disambiguation)
