= Arnon Mishkin =

American polster, media personality, and news analyst

- Born: Arnon Absalom Mishkin c. 1955 (age 70–71); New York City, U.S.
- Education: Yale University (BA); Harvard University (MBA)
- Occupations: Political consultant, pollster
- Political party: Democratic
- Spouse: Susan Ellen Fine (m. 1986)
- Children: 2

Arnon Absalom Mishkin (born c. 1955) is an American management consultant, media personality, and news analyst for Fox News. Mishkin worked as a pollster under political consultant David Garth for the Democratic Party during electoral campaigns for Ed Koch, Jay Rockefeller, and Tom Bradley. Mishkin worked as a partner at the Boston Consulting Group and the Mitchell Madison Group, and now operates his own consultancy firm known as Mishkin Associates. Since 1998, he has been consultant for Fox News as part of their Decision Desk, and has led it since 2008, including the 2008, 2012, 2016 and 2020 United States presidential elections. In 2021, Mishkin served as a fellow at the Harvard Institute of Politics and in 2023, Mishkin serves as a fellow at the USC Center for the Political Future.

== Early life and education ==
Mishkin was born to Eliezer A. Mishkin and Esther Rubin in Brooklyn, New York. He is Jewish. His father was born in what is now Belarus and emigrated to Mandate Palestine in 1937 where he earned the first PhD from the Technion - Israel Institute of Technology before moving to the United States. He later worked as a professor of applied physics at the Polytechnic Institute of New York. Mishkin's mother was from Kaunas, Lithuania: during World War II, the Soviet Union occupied Lithuania from 1940 and subsequently, Nazi Germany moved to occupy the country, establishing the Kovno Ghetto. After the Soviets moved back in during 1944, Rubin left Lithuania through Eastern Europe to Mandate Palestine, where she married Eliezer Mishkin. After relocating to the United States she became a social worker, leading the Washington Heights office of Selfhelp Community Services and volunteering for YIVO. Mishkin told B’nai Jeshurun in 2001 that his grandparents and many other family members were murdered in the Holocaust. Mishkin has a brother, Jonathan Mishkin.

Mishkin graduated from Phillips Academy in Andover, Massachusetts. He earned a Bachelor of Arts degree from Yale University and a Master of Business Administration from Harvard Business School.

== Career ==
=== Polling and consultancy ===
Mishkin got his start in politics working in New York under political consultant David Garth. Garth's team first mainly worked for Democratic Party candidates (the party to which Mishkin is a registered member), including the campaigns of Jay Rockefeller for governor and then Senator from West Virginia, as well as the Senate campaign of Mark Dayton in Minnesota. The firm also worked for Tom Bradley, then Democratic Mayor of Los Angeles in his campaign to become Governor of California in the 1982 California gubernatorial election. Bradley's lack of success in the campaign when compared to polling predictions was attributed by many as what is now known as the "Bradley effect" — the theory that some White American voters when asked by pollsters if they would be voting for the Black American candidate would say they were undecided, to avoid social ostracism, but were intending to vote for the opponent, skewing the accuracy of polling numbers. Other electoral campaigns worked on by the Garth team included John Lindsay, Ella Grasso, Brendan Byrne and Mike Bloomberg.

Aside from his work for political candidates, Mishkin also worked in news media, starting at NBC News as a general editor in the 1980s, before moving on the Fox Corporation in 1998. At the same time he continued to work for the Boston Consulting Group, which advised Forbes and the Associated Press on internet marketing and strategy as the Information Age became to gather momentum. The 2000 United States presidential election which eventually saw the election of George W. Bush was controversial, with Florida undecided on the night; it eventually went to the Supreme Court with Bush v. Gore. On the night of the election, John Prescott Ellis, Bush's cousin, headed up the Fox News Decision Desk, but subsequently stood down in the aftermath and was replaced by Mishkin who had worked as part of his team.

Mishkin, kept his role low profile until an on-air controversy during the 2012 United States presidential election. The controversy over the Fox News Decision Desk calling the closely contested state of Ohio early for Obama, played out on air as the commentator Karl Rove objected and anchor Megyn Kelly walked off set to Mishkin's operation room, confronting him on the confidence of his call, to which Mishkin confirmed "99.95 percent". Eric Bolling, former Fox Business host, claimed that Mishkin and his team were highly dismissive of Donald Trump's chances to beat Hillary Clinton during the 2016 United States presidential election, though Mishkin himself has disputed this. During the election itself, Mishkin cast his vote for Hillary Clinton as a supporter of the Democratic Party.

=== 2020 presidential election ===
Arnon Mishkin maintained his position at the head of the team running the Fox News Decision Desk for the 2020 United States presidential election, the team responsible for telling Fox News viewers the results of the elections. As the main American network which caters towards a Republican Party supporting audience, the Fox News Decision Desk and Mishkin received some attention in the run-up to the election. The New York Times published an article about Mishkin a month before the election entitled "Trump Wants to Discredit the Election. This Nerd Could Stop Him." In the lead up to the election, Mishkin and Dana Blanton were the main voices at Fox News doubting the chances of Trump being re-elected to the Presidency in his contest with Joe Biden. The two were involved in creating the new VoteCast alternative to exit polls, alongside the Associated Press. Mishkin's model has been supported by other pollsters such as Ariel Edwards-Levy of HuffPost.

On election night in November 2020, Mishkin's team called Arizona for Biden before any other major news outlet. Bret Baier, a Fox host for the election, questioned the call on air and pushed Mishkin to declare that he was 100% certain, to which Mishkin answered in the affirmative and had been considering announcing it for 30 minutes. The call was disputed by President Trump, who was reported by news outlets to be "furious" and in his speech to the nation the following morning, where he refused to concede a number of states and the election in general, specifically mentioned Fox News and Arizona, dismissing "the gentleman who called it".

== Personal life ==
Mishkin married Susan Ellen Fine, the vice president of development for Olympia and York Properties, in November 1986. Rabbi Ben-Zion Gold of the Conservative Jewish Jewish Theological Seminary of America performed the ceremony at the Ritz-Carlton Hotel in Boston. The couple has two daughters: Allison and Pamela Mishkin. The Mishkins have attend the B'nai Jeshurun synagogue in Manhattan since the late 1980s. According to the Jewish Telegraphic Agency, Mishkin is a registered member of the Democratic Party in New York.

== Filmography ==
- Best Evidence: The Research Video (1990)
