= Zee ETC Bollywood =

- Country: India; United Kingdom
- Broadcast area: Worldwide
- Headquarters: Mumbai, Maharashtra, India

Programming
- Language(s): English, Hindi
- Picture format: 576i SDTV; 1080i HDTV

Ownership
- Owner: Zee Entertainment Enterprises
- Sister channels: Zee Live, Zee TV

History
- Launched: 11 September 1999; 25 years ago
- Closed: 17 October 2020; 4 years ago

Links
- Website: www.etc.in

Zee ETC Bollywood Channel was a Bollywood trade television channel. The channel caters to audiences in the Asia Pacific region and has shows that are hosted in English and Hindi. The channel features reviews, previews, box office collections, details of new and upcoming releases, trade speculations of Hindi films. Talks with Bollywood actors, trade pundits, directors, producers, distributors and film marketers etc. give audiences the insights about a particular film from a business perspective. Well known film critic, Komal Nahta stepped into film critic Taran Adarsh's shoes as a host of one of the most prominent shows of the channel, B Biz Reviews in April 2010.

ETC is an India-based satellite television channel based in Mumbai, Maharashtra, ETC was a 24-hour Indian Music Channel.

ZEEL India decided to close the broadcast operations of ZEE ETC Bollywood from 17 October 2020 at 12:00 M.N. onwards from all leading DTH & MSO platforms. ZETC Will Be continue the IPTV Providers In the U.S.

== Network slogans ==
- 'ETC Pe Fit Toh Picture Hit’
- 'The Business of Bollywood’
