= Splendid =

Splendid may refer to:

- HMS Splendid, four ships of the British Royal Navy
- MS Splendid, a ferry in service with the Italian company Grandi Navi Veloci
- Splendid Geyser, Yellowstone National Park, United States
- Splendid (musical duo), Australian indie pop duo
- Splendid, a character in the Flash cartoon series Happy Tree Friends

== Locations ==
- Le Splendid, a Parisian café-théâtre company founded in the 1970s
