= 5B (film) =

American documentary show film

- Directed by: Dan Krauss; Paul Haggis
- Produced by: Rupert Maconick; Paul Haggis; Dan Krauss; Brendan Gaul; Guru Gowrappan; Hayley Pappas
- Cinematography: Drew Eckmann
- Edited by: Christopher Dillon
- Music by: Justin Melland
- Distributed by: RYOT
- Release date: November 4, 2018 (SFFILM)
- Running time: 94 minutes
- Country: United States
- Language: English

5B is a 2018 American documentary film directed by Dan Krauss and Paul Haggis about the efforts of a group of nurses and caregivers who opened the first AIDS ward in the world at San Francisco General Hospital and changed the way patients were cared for in the 1980s AIDS epidemic.

Verizon Media, with the help of Johnson & Johnson and Academy Award winner Julianne Moore, announced during its Newfront event in New York City on April 30, 2019, that it had acquired and planned to release the documentary.

The film first premiered at the 2018 San Francisco Doc Stories film festival and was later screened at the 2019 Cannes Film Festival on May 16, 2019, and at LA Pride on June 7, 2019. It was released nationwide June 14, 2019 in select theaters, presented by RYOT, a Verizon Media company.

== Plot summary ==
5B is the inspirational story celebrating the nurses and caregivers of the first AIDS ward unit in the United States. It is told through first-person testimony of nurses and caregivers of Ward 5B in 1983 at San Francisco General Hospital, as well as the testimonies of patients, loved ones, and staff who volunteered to create care practices based in humanity and holistic well-being during an uncertain period of American history.

== Reception ==
David Rooney wrote in The Hollywood Reporter: "As much as 5B is defined by the still-resonating sorrow of so many deaths, and the conflicted feelings of survivors from decimated communities left with few friends their own age, it's also an uplifting film about profound human decency and generosity of spirit." Guy Lodge of Variety called the film a "straight-for-the-tear-ducts documentary, which seeks first-hand inspiration and optimism amid the wreckage of an unavoidably bleak chapter in recent American history."

== Cast ==
- Alison Moed Paolercio
- Cliff Morrison
- David Denmark
- Mary Magee
- Sasha Cuttler
- Guy Vandenberg
- Dr. Paul Volberding
- Dr. Lorraine Day
- Rita Rockett
- Hank Plante
- Steve Williams
- Mary Asbury
- Leah Cleveland
- Harry Breaux
- George Kelly

== Release ==
5B was featured and was the closing film at the San Francisco Doc Stories 2018 film festival. The film premiered at the 2019 Cannes Film Festival on May 16, 2019, was set for American premiere at Los Angeles Pride on June 7, 2019, and released nationwide on June 14, 2019, in select theaters. At the Cannes Lions awards in 2019, it won a Grand Prix Award in Entertainment, with Jury President Scott Donaton quoting: “5B is a brave idea and a beautiful story that's brilliantly crafted. It can – and will – stand as a piece of great entertainment as well as an example of bold marketing. We need more stories like this, stories that make people care, that reflect a brand's values and that point the way forward for our industry.”

Co-director and producer Paul Haggis's name was removed from the film's Cannes press materials, following allegations of rape and sexual misconduct levied against him in January 2018. His name is listed in the end credits.
