= Hank Plante =

American journalist

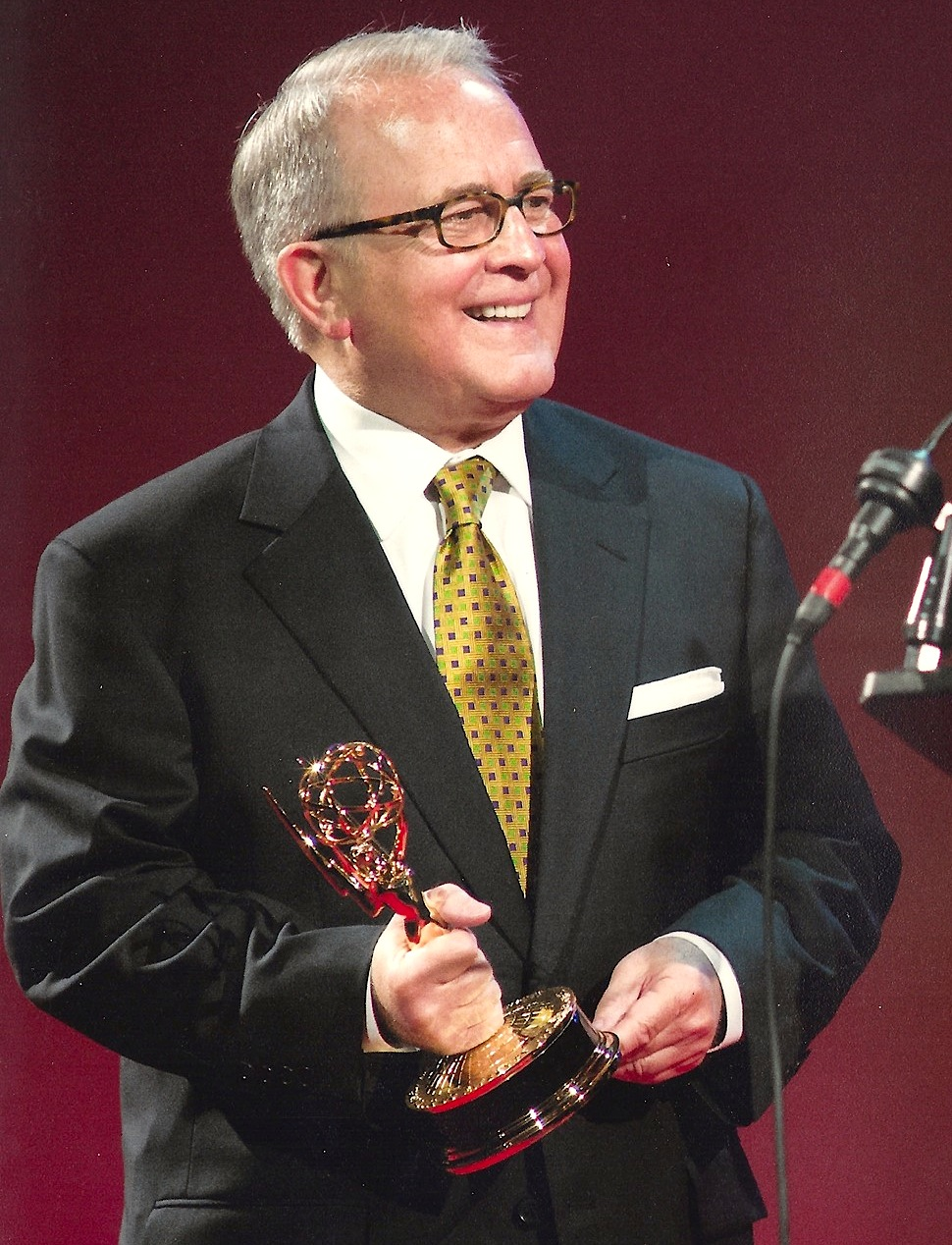
Hank Plante winning one of his six Emmy Awards.

Henry A. "Hank" Plante is an American television reporter and newspaper columnist. Winner of the George Foster Peabody Award and multiple Emmys, he covered California for three decades for TV stations in San Francisco and Los Angeles. He now writes occasional columns for newspapers in California, usually focusing on politics or gay and lesbian issues. One of the first openly gay TV reporters in the United States, Plante is the recipient of various honors from LGBT rights advocacy organizations and trade groups. In addition, Plante was featured in the documentary "5B" 5B (film), which was honored at the 2019 Cannes Film Festival . The film is about the first AIDS ward in the nation, which Plante covered as a reporter. In 2023 Hank was named a "USC Fellow" as part of the USC Center for the Political Future.

== Journalism career ==
A native of Detroit, Plante worked in both radio and television journalism, including 25 years at KPIX-TV (CBS 5) in San Francisco, before retiring in April 2010. Before that, he worked in print journalism, including at The Washington Post. At KPIX-TV, he interviewed a range of national and state political figures, including five U.S. Presidents and numerous Governors, legislators and opinion makers from Richard Nixon to Al Gore, George W. Bush, Dick Cheney, Barack Obama, Arnold Schwarzenegger, Jerry Brown and Hillary Clinton.

His experience includes reporting and anchoring at TV stations in various cities, including KHJ-TV in Los Angeles, KRIV in Houston, KMSP-TV in Minneapolis and WVEC-TV in Norfolk, Virginia. He also served as Assignment Editor at WTTG-TV in Washington, D.C., and as News Editor at WRC (NBC) Radio in Washington D.C. He began his career as a journalist in Washington, D.C. at the Sentinel Newspapers, where he was managing editor, and at The Washington Post, where he worked on the city desk.

== Professional recognition ==
His awards have included several local and national Emmys, as well as the prestigious George Foster Peabody Award, in 1986, as part of CBS 5's "AIDS Lifeline" reporting team. He has also been awarded the Pioneer Award at the GLAAD Media Awards, and the James R. Harrison Award from the San Francisco AIDS Foundation. He was also named "Reporter of the Year" by the Associated Press (APTRA'S "Chris Harris Award"). Hank was inducted into the Emmy Silver Circle by the National Television Academy, which honors individuals who have made a significant contribution to broadcasting. In addition, his work has been singled out for praise by The New York Times and other media. Plante was inducted into the LGBT Journalists Hall of Fame in 2010.

== Extraprofessional activities ==
Plante's community service has included work with the Human Rights Campaign, the Lambda Legal Defense Fund, GLAAD, Project Open Hand, and the San Francisco AIDS Foundation. He is also a 2023 University of Southern California "Fellow," teaching at class in Journalism & Politics as part of the USC Center for the Political Future.

He lives in Palm Springs, California.
