= Ben Rhodes (White House staffer) =

American writer and political commentator (born 1977)

Benjamin J. Rhodes
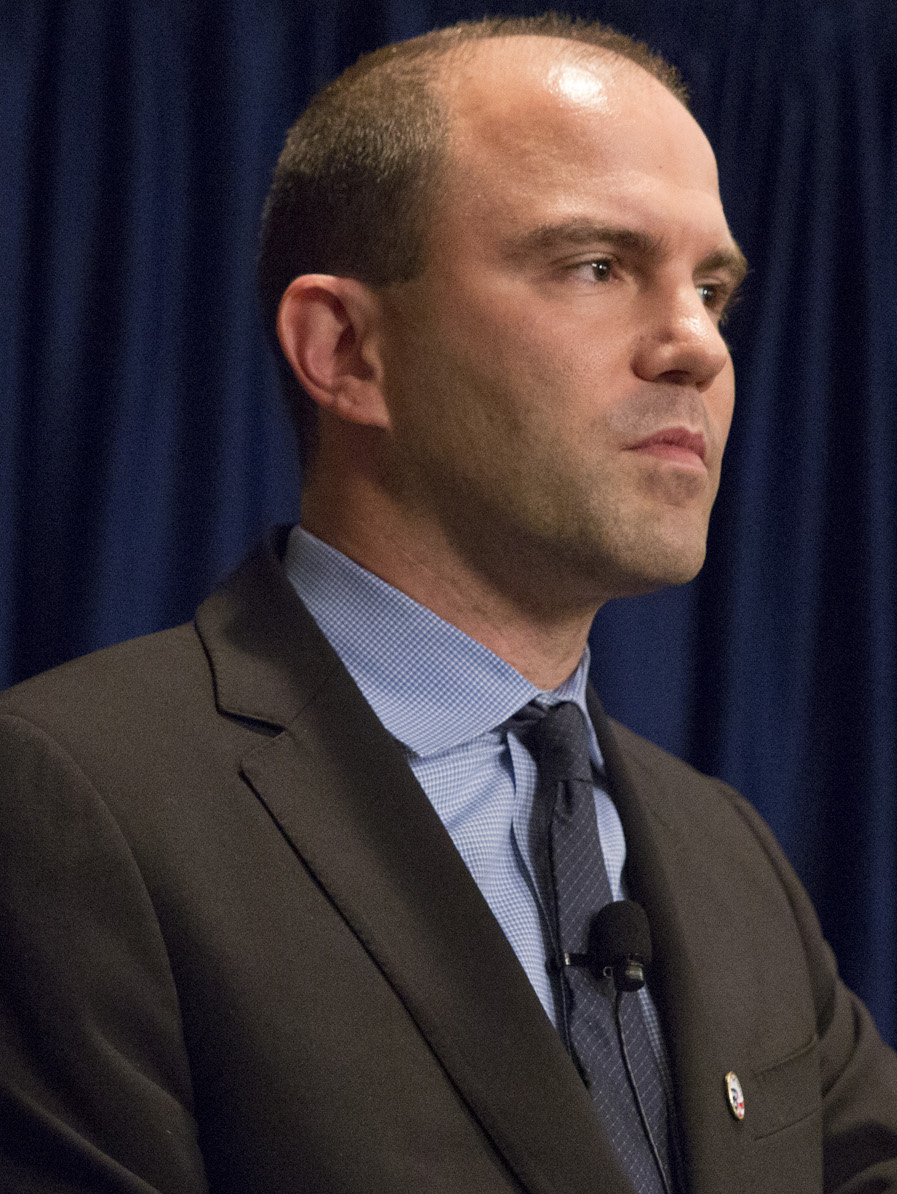
- Rhodes in June 2014

Deputy National Security Advisor for Strategic Communications
- In office January 20, 2009 – January 20, 2017
- President: Barack Obama
- Preceded by: Position established
- Succeeded by: Michael Anton

Personal details
- Born: November 14, 1977 (age 49) New York City, New York, U.S.
- Party: Democratic
- Spouse: Ann Norris
- Children: 2
- Relatives: David Rhodes (brother)
- Education: Rice University (BA); New York University (MFA)

Benjamin J. Rhodes (born November 14, 1977) is an American writer, a political commentator, and a former Deputy National Security Advisor for Strategic Communications and Speechwriting under President Barack Obama.

With Jake Sullivan, Rhodes is the co-chair of National Security Action, a political NGO. He contributes regularly as a political commentator to NBC News and MS NOW. He is also a Crooked Media contributor, and a co-host of the foreign policy podcast Pod Save the World.

== Early life and education ==
Ben Rhodes was born on November 14, 1977 on the Upper East Side of Manhattan, New York. He is the son of an Episcopal father from Texas and a Jewish mother from New York. He attended the Collegiate School in the Upper West Side, graduating in 1996.

Rhodes attended Rice University in Houston, graduating Phi Beta Kappa in 2000 majoring in English and political science. Next, moved back to New York and graduating in 2002 with an MFA degree in creative writing from New York University in Manhattan. His brother, David Rhodes, is a former president of CBS News.

== Career ==
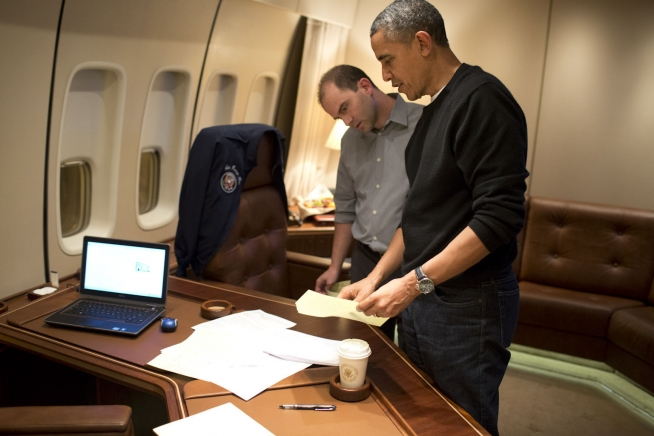
President Barack Obama and Rhodes on board Air Force One, editing the speech for the Mandela memorial service

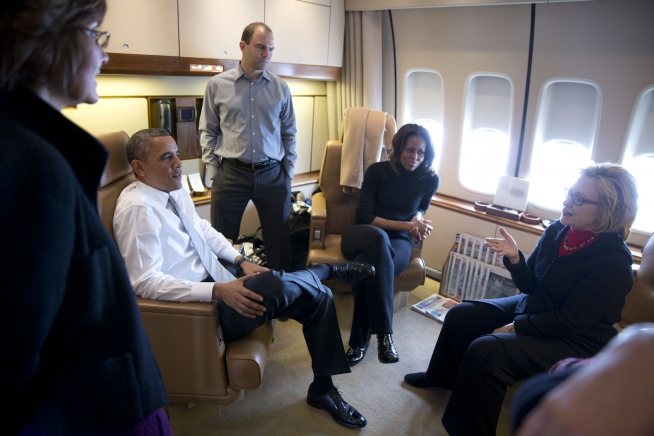
Hillary Clinton talks with the Obamas and Rhodes on board Air Force One.

In the summer of 1997, Ben Rhodes volunteered with the Rudy Giuliani mayoral campaign. In the summer of 2001, Rhodes worked on the New York City Council campaign of Diana Reyna. In 2002, James Gibney, editor of Foreign Policy, introduced Rhodes to Lee Hamilton, former member of the House of Representatives and director of the Woodrow Wilson International Center for Scholars, who was looking for a speechwriter. Rhodes was an assistant to Hamilton for five years, helping to draft the Iraq Study Group Report and the recommendations of the 9/11 Commission.

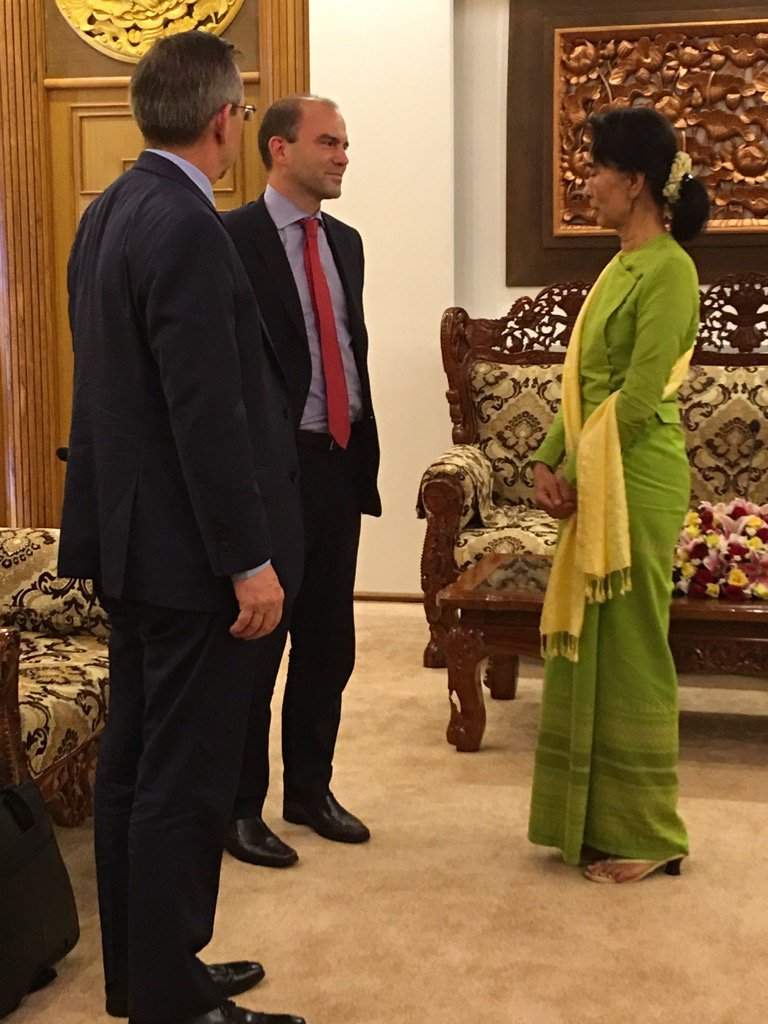
Ben Rhodes (middle) and Aung San Suu Kyi discussing U.S. support for the NLD-led government in Myanmar, July 2016

In 2007, Rhodes began working as a speechwriter for the 2008 Obama presidential campaign. He wrote Obama's 2009 Cairo speech "A New Beginning." Rhodes was the adviser who counseled Obama to withdraw support from the president of Egypt, Hosni Mubarak, becoming a key adviser during the 2011 Arab Spring. Rhodes supported Israel in the 2012 Israel–Gaza conflict.

Rhodes was instrumental in conversations which led to Obama reestablishing the United States' diplomatic relations with Cuba, which had been cut off since 1961. The New York Times reported that for "more than a year (Rhodes was) sneaking off to secret negotiations in Canada and finally at the Vatican" in advance of the official announcement in December 2014.

In a 2016 The New York Times Magazine profile, Rhodes was quoted "deriding the D.C. press corps and boasting of how he created an 'echo chamber' to market the administration's foreign policy", including the international nuclear agreement with Iran. The piece resulted in a wave of criticism, with numerous news organizations calling out Rhodes' apparent flippancy and cynicism in "pushing a 'narrative to media to sell the Iran nuclear deal".

After leaving the Obama administration, Rhodes began working as a commentator. He began contributing to Crooked Media, NBC News, and MSNBC news coverage. In 2018, he co-founded National Security Action. In 2018 he criticized the Trump administration's involvement in the Saudi Arabian-led intervention in Yemen. Speaking about the actions of the Obama administration he wrote of the war in Yemen, "Looking back, I wonder what we might have done differently, particularly if we'd somehow known that Obama was going to be succeeded by a President Trump." After the publication of the article he was criticized for his inaction while working for the Obama administration.

Rhodes said the Obama's administration was too worried about offending Turkey. He said Obama should have recognized the Armenian genocide. In 2018, Random House published Rhodes's memoir, The World as It Is, a behind-the-scenes account of Barack Obama's presidency and a New York Times bestseller. In 2021, Random House published his book After the Fall: Being American in the World We've Made, which examines the state of democracy around the world and was a New York Times bestseller.

Rhodes has written opinion articles for newspapers and magazines including The New York Times and The Atlantic. He was featured in the HBO documentary The Final Year, along with John Kerry, Samantha Power, and Susan Rice. Obama's final year in office is discussed in the documentary and the foreign policy team is profiled. In the spring of 2020, Rhodes was a fellow at the USC Center for the Political Future.

== Opinion on Netanyahu government ==
Rhodes took a relatively critical stance toward Israel during his experience working in the Obama White House, for which he was nicknamed "Hamas" by Chief of Staff Rahm Emanuel. After leaving the White House, Rhodes made public statements criticizing Benjamin Netanyahu and his government for failing to engage in good faith toward a diplomatic resolution of the Israeli–Palestinian conflict. Rhodes said it had become clear to the Obama administration that the Netanyahu government was not interested in working in earnest toward a peace treaty based on a two-state solution. According to Rhodes, "nevertheless we act like somehow Bibi Netanyahu believed in the two-state solution. We pretended to my shame at times in the Obama administration that he was interested in that. When I don't think he was, ever." In a 2021 podcast discussion with Peter Beinart, Rhodes expressed his concern that the Biden administration was making the same mistake.

== Personal attack ==
In 2017, it was alleged that Israeli private intelligence agency Black Cube attempted to manufacture incriminating or embarrassing information about Rhodes and his wife, as well as about fellow former National Security Council staffer Colin Kahl, in an apparent effort to undermine supporters of the Iran nuclear deal. Rhodes said of the incident, "This just eviscerates any norm of how governments should operate or treat their predecessors and their families. It crosses a dangerous line." The effort continued well after the Obama administration ended.

== Awards and honors ==
In 2011, Rhodes was named to Time's "40 Under 40" list of powerful and prominent young professionals. He was No. 13 on Fortune magazine's "40 Under 40" list of the most influential young people in business in 2014. In 2015, he was named one of Foreign Policy magazine's top 100 global thinkers.

== Books ==
- Kean, Thomas H.; Hamilton, Lee H.; Rhodes, Benjamin D. (2007). Without Precedent: The Inside Story of the 9/11 Commission. London: Vintage Books. ISBN 978-0-30727-663-6.
- Rhodes, Ben (2018). The World as It Is: A Memoir of the Obama White House. New York: Random House. ISBN 978-0525509356.
- Rhodes, Ben (2021). After the Fall: Being American in the World We Made. New York: Random House. ISBN 9781984856050.
- Rhodes, Ben (2026). All We Say: The Battle for American Identity: A History in 15 Speeches. New York: Random House. ISBN 9780593595121.

== Articles ==
- Rhodes, Ben, "An American Reckoning" (review of Philip Taubman and William Taubman; McNamara at War: A New History; Norton, 2025; ISBN 978-1-324-00716-6, 498 pp.); The New York Review of Books, vol. LXXIII, no. 3 (February 26, 2026), pp. 43–45; "The Vietnam War... betrayed a fatal blind spot within American liberalism, a devaluation of human life itself: the belief that a cohort of enlightened people could manage an empire while casting themselves as democrats. [Robert] McNamara... mistook strength for wisdom; he experienced power as legitimizing, even righteous." (p. 45)
- Rhodes, Ben, "Biden's Choice" (review of Akbar Shahid Ahmed, Crossing the Red Line: Biden, His Advisors, and Israel's War In Gaza, Norton, 356 pp.), The New York Review of Books, vol. LXXIII, no. 18 (19 November 2026), pp. 42–45. "Something is shifting in our culture. The fever of self-censorship is breaking. The cost of complicity is rising. The plight of Palestinians is at last being seen. An awareness is building that there is an alternative: a moral awakening out of the ashes of moral abomination." (p. 45.)

== Personal life ==
Rhodes and Ann Norris are married. Norris was the chief foreign policy adviser to former U.S. Senator Barbara Boxer. They have two daughters.
