= The World as I See It =

The World as I See It may refer to:

- The World as I See It (book), by Albert Einstein
- "The World as I See It" (song), by Jason Mraz

== See also ==
- The World as It Is (disambiguation)
