= Mark Campbell (political consultant) =

American political consultant

- Born: Camden, New Jersey
- Education: University of Tennessee (BA); Southern Methodist University (MPA); University of Pennsylvania (Ed.D)
- Occupation: Republican Campaign Strategist
- Spouse: Kathy Campbell

Mark Campbell is a Republican political strategist, and former college administrator.

Campbell was Deputy Commerce Secretary in the Commonwealth of Pennsylvania serving as Director of Small Business from 1986 to 1987, before striking out as a consultant. He immediately became "a key Republican player in the 1991 New Jersey legislative campaign that won for the GOP veto-proof majorities, the greatest GOP victory in modern New Jersey political history." Subsequently, he was the general consultant for Bret Schundler's first campaign for Mayor of Jersey City in 1992, and consequently was the subject of a profile story by Campaigns & Elections magazine in 1993.

He worked on numerous campaigns, including those for George H. W. Bush and George W. Bush, the Republican National Committee, and the National Republican Congressional Committee. He hired Republican campaign consultant Michael DuHaime to his first job out of college.

From 2000 to 2005 he served as Senior Vice President for Strategic, International and Government Affairs (initially Senior Vice President for Government and Community Affairs) and Executive Associate Dean of Petrocelli College of Continuing Studies at Fairleigh Dickinson University, located in New Jersey, Wroxton, England, and Vancouver, British Columbia, Canada., performing duties as diverse as resolving problems with students' and faculty immigration status and securing Congressional earmarks. He also co-founded the university's prominent PublicMind poll in 2000–2001, but withdrew from its operation and subsequent development to shield it from concerns about his successful partisan background. The poll went on to become nationally prominent, breaking new ground in public opinion research.

He returned to consulting in 2005, working for numerous corporate, university and national trade association clients, before becoming National Political Director of Rudy Giuliani's campaign for the Republican presidential nomination (2007–2008), He also worked as the top adviser to Congressman Jim Gerlach (R-PA) during several difficult re-election campaigns.

In 2010 he became Vice President of Learning Counts for CAEL – The Council for Adult and Experiential Learning. According to its own Website, CAEL is a national non-profit organization which creates and manages effective learning strategies for working adults through partnerships with employers, higher education, the public sector, and labor."

Campbell left CAEL in 2012 to return to political consulting as CEO of Intellz Inc. and was selected to be the executive director and spokesperson for the Committee for Legislative Reform and Term Limits which collected nearly 600,000 signatures. Other clients include New Jersey's Bergen County Executive, Kathy Dovovan, running for re-election in 2014 in New Jersey's most populous county. In 2015, he became political director for the presidential campaign of Sen. Ted Cruz. The Cruz campaign was widely viewed as having the most effective political operation. In a year when the Reagan Democrats once again drove the narrative of the political season, the Cruz campaign proved effective in pulling those voters away from the front runner Donald Trump, as Campbell's built on his years of expertise in reaching out to swing voters in traditional Democratic strongholds in New Jersey and Pennsylvania. According to Chris Cillizza, a political writer for the Washington Post, "Cruz for President" is "the best campaign of any of the 19 people seeking the presidency." In 2021, he became the campaign manager of Glenn Youngkin's bid for governor of Virginia.

In the spring of 2026, Campbell served as a Fellow at the USC Center for the Political Future where he led a study group on American democracy in the modern era.

According to LinkedIn , Campbell earned a BA from the University of Tennessee, a Master of Public Administration from Southern Methodist University, and a Doctorate of Education from the University of Pennsylvania.
