= Ben-Zion Gold =

American rabbi

Personal life
- Born: c. 1923 Radom, Poland
- Died: April 18, 2016
- Notable work: The Life of Jews in Poland before the Holocaust: A Memoir
- Education: Jewish Theological Seminary

Religious life
- Religion: Judaism
- Denomination: Conservative Judaism
- Position: Rabbi
- Organisation: Hillel at Harvard University
- Began: 1958
- Ended: 1990

Ben-Zion Gold (c. 1923 – April 18, 2016) was an American rabbi who was the Rabbi of the Hillel at Harvard University from 1958 until he became Rabbi Emeritus in 1990. Gold was born in 1923 in Radom, Poland, and is the only member of his family to have survived the Holocaust. He immigrated to the United States in 1947. He was a graduate of the Jewish Theological Seminary.

Rabbi Gold's memoir of his childhood in pre-war Poland was widely admired.

== Books ==
- Tradition and Contemporary Reality (sermons and speeches), Puritan Press (Cambridge, MA), 1990
- Rosh Hashanah: The Holiday of Creation. Messianic Delusions and Their Distortion of Our Tradition: Yom Kippur, 1994
- The Life of Jews in Poland before the Holocaust: A Memoir by Ben-Zion Gold, University of Nebraska Press (Lincoln, NE), 2007
- Cisza przed burzą. Życie polskich Żydów przed Holokaustem (Polish edition), wyd. Austeria, Kraków - Budapeszt, 2011
