= David Rhodes (media executive) =

American media executive (born 1973)

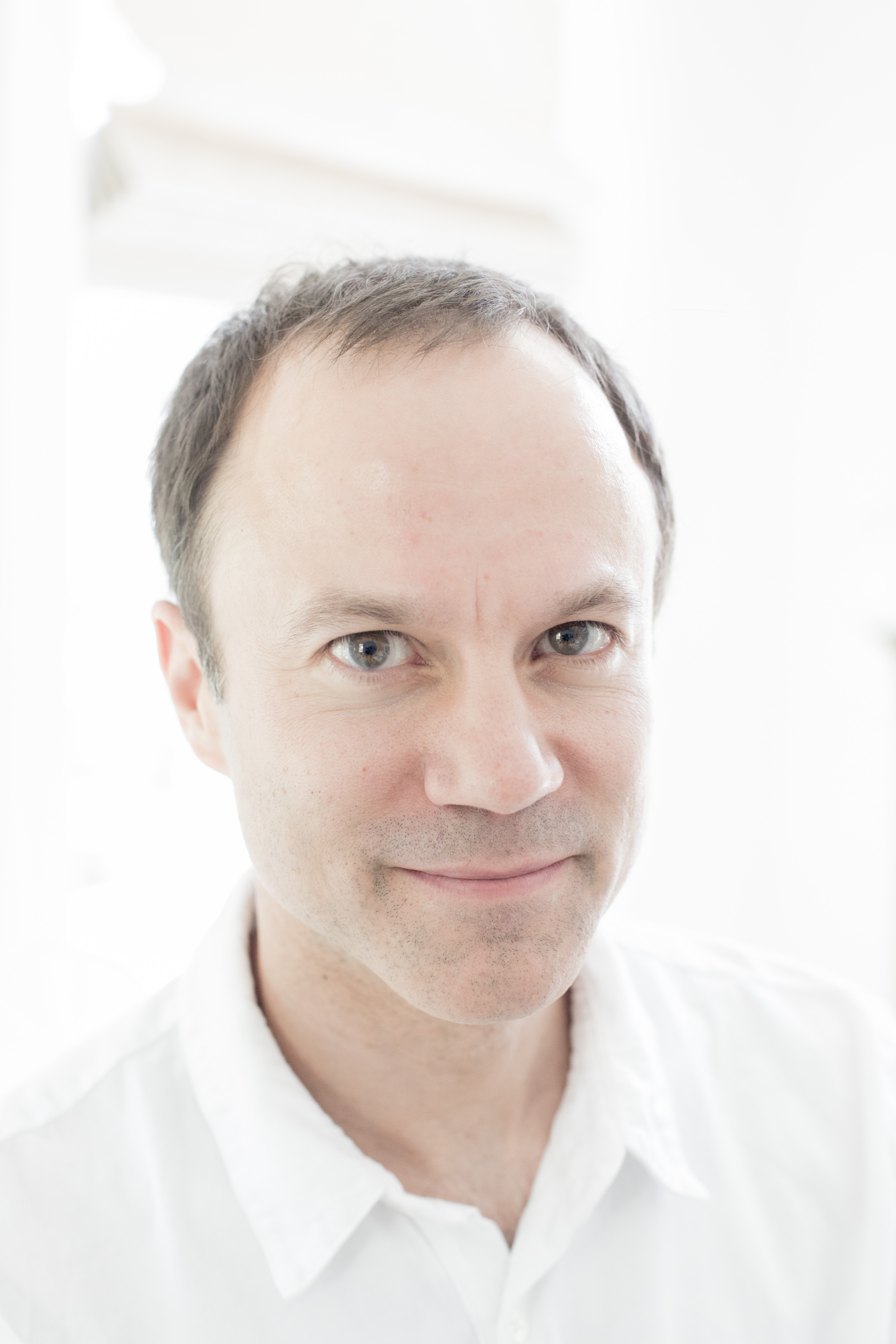
- Rhodes in 2017
- Born: December 1973 (age 52); New York City, New York, U.S.
- Education: Rice University (BA)
- Spouse: Emma Kahn (m. 2005)
- Children: 2
- Relatives: Ben Rhodes (brother)

David Rhodes (born December 1973) is an American media executive. He was named executive chairman of the Sky News Group in February 2023. In July 2021, he was hired to lead international business development at Sky, a subsidiary of US cable company Comcast Corp. He served as the president of CBS News from 2011 until 2019. He was the youngest network news president in the history of American television.

== Early life and education ==
Rhodes was born and raised in New York City. He is the son of an Episcopalian father from Texas and a Jewish mother from New York. He graduated from Rice University in Houston in 1996 with majors in economics and political science. He is the brother of Ben Rhodes, the former deputy national security adviser for strategic communications for President Barack Obama.

== Career ==
Rhodes began his career in television journalism with Fox News Channel, where he joined as a production assistant before the channel launched in October 1996. He eventually became vice president of News and stayed at FNC for 12 years. In 2008, Rhodes moved to Bloomberg L.P. as Head of U.S. Television. Bloomberg's cable channel underwent a major re-design in 2009.

In February 2011 Rhodes became president of CBS News, replacing Sean McManus. At age 37, he was the youngest network news president in the history of American television.

He was responsible for CBS News broadcasts and the division's news-gathering across all platforms including television, CBS News Radio, CBSNews.com and CBSN, the first live-anchored streaming news network.

Beginning in 2015 he took over the CBS News unit of the network. In addition, he was responsible for the supervision of the CBS Evening News, CBS This Morning and more.

Rhodes promoted "Real News" and put an emphasis on CBS News' journalistic traditions. The division began programming CBS This Morning in 2012 —emphasizing harder news coverage and bringing the morning show back to the CBS Broadcast Center from a remote studio. CBS News' Face the Nation with Bob Schieffer was expanded to one hour and emerged as the #1 Sunday morning public affairs show.

On January 6, 2019, Susan Zirinsky was named president of CBS News, replacing David Rhodes. Rhodes stepped down on March 1, 2019, "after overseeing Zirinsky’s transition and having an advisory role after that." According to Variety, with Rhodes at the helm, "CBS News expanded into new digital territories and placed more emphasis on its roots as a trusted hard-news outlet, refashioning the network’s morning show and launching streaming-news outlet CBSN."

In September 2019 he began work as a consultant for Spotify's original podcast development, and he has also worked for the Los Angeles Times since leaving CBS.

In May 2020 he began to work for News UK, the British division of Rupert Murdoch's News Corp. He is developing several current affairs and entertainment programs, but the project was discontinued when Rhodes' team concluded it was unwise to launch a traditional cable news business in the present market.

In July 2021, Rhodes was hired to lead international business development at Sky, a Comcast subsidiary. Under Rhodes' leadership, Sky News entered into a licensing agreement with ProRata.ai, a U.S.-based artificial intelligence startup, to ensure fair compensation for the use of its content in AI-generated outputs. The partnership reflects Sky News' commitment to protecting its intellectual property and supporting sustainable journalism in the evolving digital landscape. When the deal was announced, Rhodes said "we’re securing our company’s massive investment in fair and accurate news reporting – now, and well into the future." Sky News' agreement with ProRata.ai positions them as trailblazers at the intersection of journalism and technology, driving innovation to better serve audiences with cutting-edge solutions, and it is a model that "aims to address the concerns in the media industry over AI start-ups stealing their content to train and provide up-to-date responses to users."

Since joining Sky News, Rhodes has spearheaded the launch of several new initiatives, including the Electoral Dysfunction political podcast, designed to "explain what's really going on" and provide audiences with an insider's view of Westminster from veteran political voices. He has also introduced fresh ideas and new faces to Sky News programming, such as welcoming new talent like former BBC News' chief presenter Yalda Hakim to Sky; Hakim joined in 2023 to anchor a groundbreaking primetime program focused on international news. According to The Hollywood Reporter, Rhodes' investment in political coverage and "impartial, high-quality journalism" that spans the globe has been a trademark of his tenure leading the Comcast-owned European media and technology giant.

== Boards ==
Rhodes was chairman of the advisory board of The Edward R. Murrow Center for a Digital World at the Fletcher School at Tufts University. He also serves on the Rice University Board of Trustees, the Baker Institute Board of Advisors, the advisory board for Rice University's Doerr Institute for New Leaders, and the advisory board of the Scripps Howard School of Journalism and Communications.

== Awards and recognition ==
Rhodes became a Young Global Leader of the World Economic Forum at the group's 2013 gathering in Yangon, Myanmar, and participates in the forum's annual meeting in Davos, Switzerland. Rhodes reached the top 10 of Fortune Magazine’s 40 Under 40 in 2012 and has been named to a number of media and business lists, including The Hollywood Reporter's 35 Most Powerful People in Media, 2012 Crain's New York Business 40 Under 40, and GQ's 50 Most Powerful People in Washington. He is the Radio Television Digital News Foundation's 2018 First Amendment Service Award recipient.

== Personal life ==
In 2005, Rhodes married Emma Kahn. He currently splits his time between London and New York with his spouse and two sons.
