= Marc Campbell =

American baseball player (1884–1946)

- Shortstop
- Born: November 29, 1884; Punxsutawney, Pennsylvania, U.S.
- Died: February 13, 1946 (aged 61); New Bethlehem, Pennsylvania, U.S.
- Batted: Left Threw: Right

MLB debut
- September 30, 1907, for the Pittsburgh Pirates

Last MLB appearance
- October 1, 1907, for the Pittsburgh Pirates

MLB statistics
- Games played: 2
- At bats: 4
- Hits: 1
- Stats at Baseball Reference

Teams
- Pittsburgh Pirates (1907)

Marc Thaddeus Campbell (November 29, 1884 – February 13, 1946) was an American shortstop in Major League Baseball. He played for the Pittsburgh Pirates in 1907.
