= The World as It Is (book) =

2018 book by Ben Rhodes

- Author: Ben Rhodes
- Language: English
- Subject: Presidency of Barack Obama
- Genre: Memoir
- Published: June 5, 2018
- Publisher: Random House
- Publication place: United States
- Pages: 480
- ISBN: 978-0-5255-0935-6

The World as It Is is a memoir by Ben Rhodes, a former White House staffer and longtime adviser to former U.S. president Barack Obama. The book was released by Random House on June 5, 2018. It includes a recounting of many important events during Obama's two terms as president. It also includes reactions of world leaders, including Obama and German chancellor Angela Merkel, to the election of President Donald Trump as the 45th President of the United States.
