= Zee Live =

Entertainment company

- Industry: Live Entertainment
- Headquarters: Mumbai, Maharashtra, India
- Key people: Swaroop Banerjee (COO & Business Head)
- Products: Arth - A Culture Fest, Supermoon, Zee Educare

Zee Live is an IP division of Zee Entertainment Enterprises that aims to create programming for all age groups in India. Currently under its umbrella are 3 productions – Arth – A Culture Fest in culture, Supermoon in music and comic, and Zee Educare in education. Swaroop Banerjee now heads Zee Live.

== Divisions ==
=== Arth – A Culture Fest ===
The first season of Arth was held on 1 and 2 December 2018, at P C Chandra Garden, Kolkata and on 8, 9 & 10 December 2018, at IGNCA, New Delhi, and the second season was held on 4 & 5 January 2020, at Swabhumi, Kolkata and 21, 22 and 23 February, at Jawaharlal Nehru Stadium, Delhi.

=== Supermoon ===
Supermoon brings entertainment acts from around the world to India.

=== Zee Educare ===
Zee Educare is an alternate career festival for students.

Season 1 of the festival took place on 20 and 21 April 2019, and Season 2 on 23 and 24 November 2019.

Zee Educare also hosts a nation-wide talent hunt titled "Big Break" where the top 5 entries are given an opportunity to perform live at the festival. The winner of the Big Break wins Rs 50,000 and the top 5 are given the opportunity to open for the headliner.
