= Janson Design Group =

The Janson + Tsai Design Associates is an American architecture, acoustic and audio video design firm that specializes in the design of media and entertainment facilities that include television studios, film sound stages, music recording studios, post production suites, audio mixing/color correction and editing, screening rooms and theaters. The firm has worked in 27 countries in the past 15 years and maintains a global practice in all practice areas.

== Practice ==
Founded by Dennis Janson in 1997, the firm is a medium-sized specialty firm. Mr. Janson has practiced in these specialty areas since 1979.

The firm specializes in the design of television studios/facilities, film and sound stages, music recording studios, post production suites, screening rooms, production facilities, mixing rooms and specialty interactive and media design for networks, corporations, governments, private individuals and has even worked for the US Broadcast Board of Governors. They are also acoustical and audio video consultants to outside clients and other design firms.

The firm is in Miami and Shenyang, China and works both in the United States and abroad. Work abroad has included locations in the United Kingdom, Eastern and Western Europe, Southeast Asia, India, the Middle East China and the far East.

The firm and their projects have been published numerous times both in the US and abroad. Their clients include most major broadcasting companies in the US, the Middle East and Europe.

== Awards ==
- 2002 - 2 Mix Magazine TEC Awards - Right Track Studio A509, for best studio design and best acoustic designNew York City.
- 2004 - AIA Connecticut Design Award - Wesleyan University Center for Film Studies (Janson were the cinema consultants).
- 2017 Mix Magazine for Bowling Green State University recording studio
- 2017 Broadcast technology Magazine for Bowling Green State University television studio production facility
