= HMS Splendid =

Two ships and two submarines of the Royal Navy have been named HMS Splendid.

- HMS Splendid (1597) was listed in 1597, with an unknown fate.
- HMS Splendid (1918) was an S-class destroyer, launched in 1918, and sold in 1931.
- HMS Splendid (P228) was a S-class submarine, launched in 1942 and sunk in 1943 by a German destroyer.
- HMS Splendid (S106) was a Swiftsure-class nuclear-powered hunter killer submarine.

== Battle honours ==
Ships named Splendid have earned the following battle honours:

- Mediterranean, 1942
- North Africa, 1942
- Falkland Islands, 1982
