= List of The Opposition with Jordan Klepper episodes =

This is a list of episodes for the late-night Comedy Central series The Opposition with Jordan Klepper.

== Episodes ==
=== 2017 ===
==== September ====
No.	Original release date	Guest(s)	US viewers (millions)
1	September 25, 2017	Kurt Andersen	0.532
Jordan discusses the alternative media's unique viewpoints, introduces his team of Citizen Journalists and sits down with author Kurt Andersen. Theme: Mental Nationalism
2	September 26, 2017	Neal Katyal	0.432
Jordan offers tips for reclaiming football, discusses what liberals don't get about humor with Josh Sharp and Aaron Jackson, and sits down with attorney Neal Katyal. Theme: America First, Americans Second
3	September 27, 2017	Ruth Marcus	0.515
Jordan examines the results of the Alabama Senate primary, determines which numbers can be trusted and chats with journalist Ruth Marcus.
4	September 28, 2017	DeRay Mckesson	0.446
Jordan gets a huge scoop about the Russian hacking scandal, breaks down higher education with Citizen Journalist Kobi Libii and sits down with activist DeRay Mckesson.

==== October ====
No.	Original release date	Guest(s)	US viewers (millions)
5	October 2, 2017	Asha Rangappa	0.358
Jordan dissects Tom Price's resignation, expands on Donald Trump's Hurricane Maria efforts and discusses the Russian hacking scandal with former FBI agent Asha Rangappa. Note: Klepper opens the show by speaking out of character about the 2017 Las Vegas shooting.
6	October 3, 2017	Richard Painter	0.376
Jordan offers tips to avoid discussing gun control, confronts former EPA administrator Gina McCarthy about climate change and chats with lawyer Richard Painter.
7	October 4, 2017	Michael Crowley	0.368
Jordan calls out the FDA's heartless practices, predicts the outcome of President Trump's first space council meeting and chats with Politico correspondent Michael Crowley.
8	October 5, 2017	Jane Mayer	0.301
Jordan honors the internet's brave truth tellers, sends Citizen Journalists Josh Sharp and Aaron Jackson to the March for Racial Justice and chats with author Jane Mayer.
9	October 16, 2017	David Litt	0.414
Jordan recaps the president's visit to the Values Voter Summit, dissects Donald Trump's growing list of frenemies and sits down with author David Litt.
10	October 17, 2017	Bill Kristol	0.355
Jordan reveals the truth about coal, sends Citizen Journalist Laura Grey to investigate Oklahoma's oil-funded school systems and chats with editor Bill Kristol.
11	October 18, 2017	Nate Silver	0.355
Jordan dissects Donald Trump's emoluments case, exposes Amazon's hold on small town America and chats with FiveThirtyEight founder Nate Silver.
12	October 19, 2017	Carol Anderson	0.294
Jordan introduces Steve Bannon's team of anti-establishment candidates, breaks down the Melania Trump body double conspiracy and sits down with author Carol Anderson.
13	October 23, 2017	Matt Taibbi	0.305
Jordan celebrates the upcoming release of classified JFK files, sends Kobi Libii to infiltrate Antifa and chats with author Matt Taibbi.
14	October 24, 2017	Bill Nye	0.353
Jordan decodes a cryptic tweet from James Comey, breaks down EPA Chief Scott Pruitt's business approach to the environment and chats with legendary science guy Bill Nye.
15	October 25, 2017	Maura Healey	0.362
Jordan discusses the DNC's alleged funding of the Trump-Russia dossier, spreads the word about gun-related threats and chats with Massachusetts Attorney General Maura Healey.
16	October 26, 2017	Bruce Bartlett	0.338
Jordan dissects President Trump's tax reform plan, talks climate change with globalist Richard Branson and sits down with author of The Truth Matters Bruce Bartlett.
17	October 30, 2017	Rob Reiner	0.341
Jordan exposes the distracting news of Rick Gates and Paul Manafort's indictments, creates a safe space for powerful men to chat and sits down with LBJ director Rob Reiner.
18	October 31, 2017	Erin Gloria Ryan	0.301
Jordan calls on the Citizen Journalists to tell scary stories, sends Laura Grey to investigate an anti-Trump coven and chats with Daily Beast editor Erin Gloria Ryan.

==== November ====
No.	Original release date	Guest(s)	US viewers (millions)
19	November 1, 2017	Clint Watts	0.296
Jordan breaks down Congress's investigation into Russian-linked Facebook ads, compiles a list of America's worst enemies and sits down with security analyst Clint Watts.
20	November 2, 2017	Bassem Youssef	0.301
Jordan defends President Trump's questionable remarks, consults Josh Sharp and Aaron Jackson about which leftist movies to avoid, and chats with comedian Bassem Youssef.
21	November 6, 2017	Nikole Hannah-Jones	0.312
Jordan reacts to recent gun violence, praises Trump's "Americanness" abroad and talks to Nikole Hannah-Jones about school segregation.
22	November 7, 2017	David Daley	0.396
Jordan discusses the future of Betsy DeVos's role as Secretary of Education, sends Citizen Journalist Tim Baltz to investigate voter fraud and chats with author David Daley.
23	November 8, 2017	Jon Lovett	0.413
Jordan celebrates the anniversary of Donald Trump's presidential win, sings the praises of Donna Brazile and sits down with Lovett or Leave It host Jon Lovett.
24	November 9, 2017	Jen Psaki	0.319
Jordan makes a harsh discovery about Trump's visit to China, uncovers Puerto Rico's plan to infiltrate swing states and chats with former White House staffer Jen Psaki.
25	November 13, 2017	Jose Calderon	0.347
Jordan discusses the allegations against Roy Moore, checks in on the hurricane recovery effort in Puerto Rico and sits down with Hispanic Federation president Jose Calderon.
26	November 14, 2017	Jeff Ross	0.301
Jordan examines Donald Trump Jr.'s supposed collusion with WikiLeaks, introduces a sale for his fellow freethinkers and talks immigration with Roastmaster General Jeff Ross.
27	November 15, 2017	Sarah Lacy	0.390
Jordan breaks down Trump's judicial picks with Citizen Journalist Niccole Thurman, talks to a member of Trump's voter fraud commission and chats with author Sarah Lacy.
28	November 16, 2017	Molly Ball	0.278
Jordan reunites with Jon Stewart to promote Night of Too Many Stars, celebrates Thanksgiving with the Citizen Journalists and sits down with TIME magazine political correspondent Molly Ball.
29	November 27, 2017	Bill Browder	0.325
Jordan gives President Trump the thanks he deserves, sends Citizen Journalist Tim Baltz to investigate sexism in Silicon Valley and chats with author Bill Browder.
30	November 28, 2017	D. L. Hughley	0.417
Jordan takes a closer look at Project Veritas, ponders the shape of the earth with Citizen Journalist Kobi Libii and sits down with How Not to Get Shot author D.L. Hughley.
31	November 29, 2017	Danica Roem	0.446
Jordan addresses a nuclear threat to America, breaks down President Trump's plans to repeal net neutrality and sits down with Virginia Delegate-elect Danica Roem.
32	November 30, 2017	Paul Scheer	0.333
Jordan enlists his team of Citizen Journalists to create campaign ads for Roy Moore, discovers the latest threat to Christmas and chats with comedian Paul Scheer.

==== December ====
No.	Original release date	Guest(s)	US viewers (millions)
33	December 4, 2017	Kwame Alexander	0.359
Jordan celebrates the Republican tax plan victory, breaks down the proposed changes to concealed carry laws and sits down with poet Kwame Alexander.
34	December 5, 2017	Daniel Ellsberg	0.451
Jordan details Donald Trump's plans to shrink Utah's monuments, sends Josh Sharp and Aaron Jackson to investigate campus free speech and sits down with author Daniel Ellsberg.
35	December 6, 2017	Jennifer Egan	0.341
Jordan unpacks the IOC's decision to ban Russia from the 2018 Winter Games, browses the Alt-Bible with Citizen Journalist Laura Grey and sits down with author Jennifer Egan.
36	December 7, 2017	Scott Kelly	0.340
Jordan discusses Donald Trump Jr.'s genius courtroom tactics with Niccole Thurman, takes the #MAGAMealChallenge and sits down with astronaut Scott Kelly.
37	December 11, 2017	John Della Volpe	0.313
Jordan defends Trump's soda habit, celebrates the rejection of fact-based smears against Roy Moore and talks with John Della Volpe about millennials' political futures.
38	December 12, 2017	Jessica Rosenworcel	0.258
Jordan predicts the results of the Alabama Senate race, discusses the sexual misconduct allegations against Donald Trump and chats with FCC Commissioner Jessica Rosenworcel.
39	December 13, 2017	Chris Matthews	0.382
Jordan finds a scapegoat for Roy Moore's loss in Alabama, visits Donald Trump's final rally of the year and sits down with MSNBC's Chris Matthews.
40	December 14, 2017	Lauren Duca	0.313
Jordan describes the impact of voter suppression on the Trump family, looks back on the year's biggest stories and chats with Teen Vogue columnist Lauren Duca.

=== 2018 ===
==== January ====
No.	Original release date	Guest(s)	US viewers (millions)
41	January 2, 2018	Natasha Bertrand	0.285
Jordan honors American hero Guy Fieri, imagines the possibilities for a MAGA Football League with Tim Baltz and chats with journalist Natasha Bertrand.
42	January 3, 2018	Jeff Goodell	0.363
Jordan breaks down President Trump and Steve Bannon's public feud, talks to Laura Grey about the U.S.'s mean girl tactics and sits down with author Jeff Goodell.
43	January 4, 2018	David Miliband	0.290
Jordan details the White House infighting over Michael Wolff's tell-all, dissects the editing of Milo Yiannopoulos's controversial book and sits down with David Miliband.
44	January 8, 2018	Ty Segall	0.276
Jordan warns of a liberal threat to President Trump in 2020, appoints a special agent to take down Robert Mueller and musician Ty Segall performs My Lady's on Fire.
45	January 9, 2018	Brian Stelter	0.301
Jordan reveals unverified dirt on Special Counsel Robert Mueller, sends Kobi Libii to investigate the Syrian refugee presence in Idaho and sits down with CNN's Brian Stelter.
46	January 10, 2018	Brian Klaas	0.355
Jordan discovers the dangers of bipartisanship, sends Kobi Libii to Lee Stranahan's citizen journalism school and chats with The Despot's Apprentice author Brian Klaas.
47	January 11, 2018	Jelani Cobb	0.410
Jordan warns of the dangers of the free press, learns the latest conservative trends from Niccole Thurman and Laura Grey and chats with The New Yorker's Jelani Cobb.
48	January 15, 2018	Rob Riggle	0.371
Jordan makes sense of President Trump's comments about Haitian and African immigrants, sheds light on the "raw water" trend and sits down with 12 Strong star Rob Riggle.
49	January 16, 2018	Jessica Valenti	0.287
Jordan uncovers President Trump's most boring political scandal, warns of the insidious war on men and chats with author Jessica Valenti.
50	January 17, 2018	Matt Gertz	0.308
Jordan sends Josh Sharp and Aaron Jackson to meet nominees for the Fake News Awards, learns a workout routine from Tim Baltz and chats with Media Matters fellow Matt Gertz.
51	January 18, 2018	David Cay Johnston	0.367
Jordan learns about America's metaphorical border wall, sends Niccole Thurman to investigate artwork by Guantanamo Bay detainees and chats with author David Cay Johnston.
52	January 22, 2018	Jason Kander	0.337
Jordan reveals the details of a secret government shutdown, explores Donald Trump's approach to female voters and sits down with Let America Vote president Jason Kander.
53	January 23, 2018	Vicente Fox	0.255
Jordan breaks down Hollywood's liberal Oscar nominees, discovers a solution for conservatives in California and chats with former Mexican President Vicente Fox.
54	January 24, 2018	Stephanie Schriock	0.291
Jordan calls for an end to the gun violence debate, sends Kobi Libii to investigate Muslim extremism in Michigan and chats with Emily's List president Stephanie Schriock.
55	January 25, 2018	Ted Lieu	0.325
Jordan drafts a classified memo about the FBI, puts a new spin on politically correct words with Tim Baltz and sits down with Congressman Ted Lieu.
56	January 29, 2018	Roy Wood Jr.	0.394
Jordan welcomes Sean Hannity to the fringe, dissects the decline of LGBTQ acceptance with Josh Sharp and Aaron Jackson and chats with This Is Not Happening host Roy Wood Jr.
57	January 30, 2018	Lauren Duca, Charlamagne tha God	0.380
In this live post-State of the Union episode, Jordan clarifies Trump's message of unity, sends Kobi Libii to a boycott and sits down with Charlamagne Tha God and Lauren Duca.
58	January 31, 2018	Catherine Rampell	0.322
Jordan weighs in on the left's plus-ones at the State of the Union, investigates the Department of Education and chats with The Washington Post's Catherine Rampell.

==== February ====
No.	Original release date	Guest(s)	US viewers (millions)
59	February 1, 2018	Michael Arceneaux	0.316
Jordan examines Donald Trump's unfilled cabinet, passes holy judgment on public figures and chats with I Can't Date Jesus author Michael Arceneaux.
60	February 5, 2018	Ijeoma Oluo	0.287
Jordan defends a controversial pickup truck ad, celebrates the Nunes memo and chats with author Ijeoma Oluo about her book So You Want to Talk About Race.
61	February 6, 2018	Adam Serwer	0.305
Jordan adds new enemies to his list, frets over an alarming new version of Monopoly and sits down with The Atlantic's Adam Serwer.
62	February 7, 2018	Robin Thede	0.349
Jordan defends President Trump's desire for a military parade, discusses Black History Month with Kobi Libii and chats with host of The Rundown Robin Thede.
63	February 8, 2018	Tarana Burke	0.361
Jordan creates a manlier national anthem, sends Tim Baltz to interrogate former FBI official Frank Montoya Jr. and chats with founder of the #MeToo movement Tarana Burke.
64	February 20, 2018	Lacey Schwartz Delgado, Mat Johnson	0.308
Jordan offers advice to civic-minded teens, discusses the #NeverAgain movement with student activists and chats with Lacey Schwartz Delgado and Mat Johnson of The Loving Generation.
65	February 21, 2018	Clint Smith	0.236
Jordan unpacks the fringe media's theory about the Parkland mass shooting, grills former U.S. diplomats and sits down with author Clint Smith.
66	February 22, 2018	Ali Siddiq	0.323
Jordan applauds NRA spokesperson Dana Loesch's historical expertise, discovers the Trumpian themes in Black Panther and sits down with comedian Ali Siddiq.
67	February 26, 2018	Baratunde Thurston	0.360
Jordan discusses a major loss for NRA members and chats with How to Be Black author Baratunde Thurston, and Laura Grey talks to teen gun control advocates in Florida.
68	February 27, 2018	Wesley Lowery	0.346
Jordan fantasizes about authoritarian rule in America, uncovers the narc trying to take down Alex Jones and sits down with The Washington Post's Wesley Lowery.
69	February 28, 2018	Anthea Butler	0.317
Jordan praises Donald Trump's impeccable cabinet, breaks down the major changes happening in American culture and sits down with religious studies professor Anthea Butler.

==== March ====
No.	Original release date	Guest(s)	US viewers (millions)
70	March 1, 2018	Bakari Sellers	0.317
Jordan heads to CPAC with Kobi Libii and Tim Baltz, chats with educators about Trump's plan to bring guns into the classroom and sits down with CNN's Bakari Sellers.
71	March 5, 2018	Nikki Glaser	0.326
The Florida Senate walks back a ban on AR-15 rifles, Tim Baltz gets amped up for President Trump's trade war, and Nikki Glaser discusses her Comedy Central Radio show, You Up.
72	March 6, 2018	Cass Sunstein	0.295
Jordan unpacks Sam Nunberg's media blitz, salutes lawmakers' righteous attempts to end gun violence and sits down with Can It Happen Here? author Cass Sunstein.
73	March 7, 2018	Christian Picciolini	0.391
Jordan unveils a theory about President Trump's alter ego, gripes about online dating with Niccole Thurman and chats with White American Youth author and co-founder of Life After Hate Christian Picciolini.
74	March 8, 2018	Jesse Eisinger	0.355
Jordan gets Tim Baltz's take on International Women's Day, sends Josh Sharp and Aaron Jackson on a mission in Kentucky and sits down with author Jesse Eisinger.
75	March 12, 2018	Jamali Maddix	0.311
Jordan breaks down the MSM's attack on Betsy DeVos, ponders what's wrong with America's youth and sits down with Hate Thy Neighbor host Jamali Maddix.
76	March 13, 2018	Tom Nichols	0.318
Jordan celebrates the House Intelligence Committee's Russian collusion decision, learns the fundamentals of conservative comedy and chats with author Tom Nichols.
77	March 14, 2018	Maya Wiley	0.326
Jordan breaks down the Pennsylvania special election results, introduces an alternative to government-funded education and sits down with Professor Maya Wiley.
78	March 15, 2018	Andrew Marantz	0.290
Jordan exposes CNN anchor Chris Cuomo's illicit breakfast behavior, sits down with former Trump adviser Carter Page and chats with The New Yorker's Andrew Marantz.
79	March 19, 2018	Julia Ioffe	0.328
Jordan marvels at Russia's impressive election results, warns Americans about the dangerous war on men and chats with Atlantic contributor Julia Ioffe.
80	March 20, 2018	of Montreal	0.300
Jordan discusses President Trump's strategy for solving America's opioid crisis, Kobi Libii investigates an online conspiracy and of Montreal performs Soft Music.
81	March 21, 2018	Kate Folmar	0.301
Jordan questions who's really behind the March for Our Lives protests, reveals what the left doesn't know about guns and chats with Everytown for Gun Safety's Kate Folmar.
82	March 22, 2018	Cory Booker	0.307
Jordan talks to the organizers of DC Teens Action, sends Kobi Libii to meet with a group of Baltimore students protesting gun violence and chats with Senator Cory Booker.
83	March 26, 2018	Michael Ian Black	0.427
Jordan confronts teens at the March For Our Lives, finds out how Trump's base feels about his alleged affair with Stormy Daniels and chats with comedian Michael Ian Black.
84	March 27, 2018	Amy Siskind	0.284
Jordan warns of the possibility of space debris falling to Earth, passes holy judgment on public figures and chats with The List author Amy Siskind.
85	March 28, 2018	Kay Cannon	0.323
Jordan suggests innocuous questions to add to the 2020 census, gives props to Fox News host Jeanine Pirro and chats with Blockers director Kay Cannon.
86	March 29, 2018	Alan Dershowitz	0.305
Jordan salutes the defenders of the Second Amendment, leads a gun-friendly yoga class and sits down with attorney Alan Dershowitz.

==== April ====
No.	Original release date	Guest(s)	US viewers (millions)
87	April 9, 2018	Aparna Nancherla	0.334
Jordan breaks down President Trump's relationship with Fox News, sends Niccole Thurman to investigate drag queen storytellers and sits down with comedian Aparna Nancherla.
88	April 10, 2018	Gregory T. Angelo	0.350
Jordan warns America about the FBI's attacks, offers Mark Zuckerberg tips for his congressional hearing and chats with Log Cabin Republicans President Gregory T. Angelo.
89	April 11, 2018	Alan Dershowitz & Sally Kohn	0.250
Jordan breaks the shocking news about Paul Ryan's spinelessness, dines with attorney Alan Dershowitz and sits down with The Opposite of Hate author Sally Kohn.
90	April 12, 2018	Bari A. Williams	0.296
Jordan breaks down Scott Pruitt's EPA challenge coin redesign, sends Kobi Libii to confront a crisis actor posing as Alex Jones, and chats with tech exec Bari A. Williams.
91	April 16, 2018	Rick Tyler	0.347
Jordan dissects Infowars host Alex Jones's emotional reaction to Trump's Syrian missile strike, ponders America's ongoing changes and chats with MSNBC's Rick Tyler.
92	April 17, 2018	David Corn & Michael Isikoff	0.322
Jordan reveals Sean Hannity's ties to Michael Cohen, Tim Baltz dives into a conservative punk movement, and authors David Corn and Michael Isikoff discuss Russian Roulette.
93	April 18, 2018	Alicia Menendez	0.356
Jordan puts the blame for recent political blunders on Nikki Haley, gets to know conservative YouTube dynamos Diamond and Silk, and chats with Bustle's Alicia Menendez.
94	April 19, 2018	Jay Chandrasekhar & Steve Lemme	0.271
Josh Sharp and Aaron Jackson investigate global warming, Jordan takes calls from fans seeking advice, and Jay Chandrasekhar and Steve Lemme talk Super Troopers 2.
95	April 23, 2018	Ross Douthat	0.285
Jordan and Kobi Libii wrongly assume that the hero of a shooting in Nashville was armed, the war on men continues, and author Ross Douthat talks To Change the Church.
96	April 24, 2018	Justin Simien	0.309
Jordan welcomes Kanye West to the right, honors the brave defenders of the Second Amendment and chats with Dear White People director Justin Simien.
97	April 25, 2018	Annie Waldman	0.346
Jordan offers career advice to White House physician Ronny Jackson, makes a plea to Hillary Clinton on behalf of Republicans and chats with ProPublica reporter Annie Waldman.
98	April 26, 2018	Adam Pally	0.287
Jordan dissects President Trump's Fox & Friends interview, Niccole Thurman meets the teens running for governor of Kansas, and Adam Pally discusses Most Likely to Murder.
99	April 30, 2018	Cecile Richards	0.337
Jordan praises Donald Trump's insult diplomacy, Josh Sharp and Aaron Jackson attend a Trump rally in Michigan, and Planned Parenthood's Cecile Richards talks Make Trouble.

==== May ====
No.	Original release date	Guest(s)	US viewers (millions)
100	May 1, 2018	Garry Kasparov	0.240
Jordan dissects Robert Mueller's questions for President Trump, breaks down the Trump administration's divine plans for sex education and chats with Garry Kasparov.
101	May 2, 2018	Cenk Uygur	0.303
Jordan introduces West Virginia's fringe candidate Don Blankenship, recognizes MAGA-ism as a religion and sits down with The Young Turks host Cenk Uygur.
102	May 3, 2018	Ron Livingston	0.322
Jordan sheds light on Rudy Giuliani's legal expertise, Josh Sharp and Aaron Jackson bring conservatism back to the Boy Scouts of America, and Ron Livingston discusses Tully.
103	May 7, 2018	Jonah Goldberg	0.286
Jordan gives Devin Nunes advice, Tim Baltz meets with former Consumer Financial Protection Bureau Director Richard Cordray, and Jonah Goldberg discusses Suicide of the West.
104	May 8, 2018	Mark Duplass & Jay Duplass	0.388
Jordan prepares for Trump's showdown with Robert Mueller, Laura Grey and Niccole Thurman investigate an island for women, and Mark and Jay Duplass discuss Like Brothers.
105	May 9, 2018	Nell Scovell	0.321
Jordan dissects President Trump's Iran deal decision, Laura Grey tries to reach teachers protesting in Colorado, and Nell Scovell discusses Just the Funny Parts.
106	May 10, 2018	Amy Chozick	0.289
Jordan finds a handsome new lawyer for President Trump, Josh Sharp and Aaron Jackson critique the liberal summer movie sequels, and Amy Chozick discusses Chasing Hillary.
107	May 14, 2018	Anthony Scaramucci	0.309
Jordan praises President Trump for keeping his promises, breaks down America's immigration policy and chats with former White House Communications Director Anthony Scaramucci.
108	May 15, 2018	Jonathan Capehart	0.276
Jordan addresses North Carolina's congressional diversity concerns, helps Tim Baltz fix President Trump's problems and chats with The Washington Post's Jonathan Capehart.
109	May 16, 2018	Lizz Winstead	0.291
Jordan breaks down the boring details of the British royal wedding, gripes about the latest changes in America and chats with Lady Parts Justice League founder Lizz Winstead.
110	May 29, 2018	Liz Garbus	0.328
Jordan uses his gaslight to shed light on Trump's immigration policy, answers questions from callers with Tim Baltz and chats with The Fourth Estate director Liz Garbus.
111	May 30, 2018	U-God	0.381
Jordan breaks down Ted Cruz's questionable campaign tactics, gets to know the latest freethinkers running for office and chats with Raw author Lamont "U-God" Hawkins.
112	May 31, 2018	Bernie Sanders	0.374
Jordan praises President Trump's decision to pardon Dinesh D'Souza, gripes about the latest changes in America and sits down with Vermont Senator Bernie Sanders.

==== June ====
No.	Original release date	Guest(s)	US viewers (millions)
113	June 4, 2018	Yamiche Alcindor	0.388
Jordan celebrates 500 days of the Trump presidency, takes on the NBA with Citizen Journalist Tim Baltz and sits down with PBS NewsHour correspondent Yamiche Alcindor.
114	June 5, 2018	Sheri Fink	0.286
Jordan discusses Trump's canceled Philadelphia Eagles celebration, sends Kobi Libii to investigate the sanctuary movement and chats with The New York Times's Sheri Fink.
115	June 6, 2018	Franchesca Ramsey	0.316
Jordan calls on the Citizen Journalists to decode IHOP's bizarre name change, exposes the latest battlefronts of the war on men and sits down with comedian Franchesca Ramsey.
116	June 7, 2018	Will Sommer	0.309
Jordan weighs in on the NRA's loyalty questionnaire, finds a new way to grant clemency to low-level offenders and chats with The Daily Beast's Will Sommer.
117	June 11, 2018	Shannon Watts	0.355
Jordan recaps President Trump's visit to the G7 summit, celebrates America's brave Second Amendment defenders and chats with gun safety advocate Shannon Watts.
118	June 12, 2018	Mike Pesca	0.287
Jordan celebrates the success of President Trump's meeting with Kim Jong-un, breaks down Dennis Rodman's role in the North Korean summit and chats with author Mike Pesca.
119	June 13, 2018	Hari Kondabolu	0.339
Jordan savors Trump's historic peace summit win, commissions a piece of art for the president's birthday and chats with comedian Hari Kondabolu.
120	June 14, 2018	Clint Watts	0.342
Jordan salutes the latest freethinkers running for office, helps America understand who Michael Cohen really is and chats with Messing with the Enemy author Clint Watts.
121	June 18, 2018	Dan Pfeiffer	0.274
Jordan breaks down President Trump's zero-tolerance immigration policy, Laura Grey chats with Senator Jeff Merkley, and Dan Pfeiffer discusses "Yes We (Still) Can."
122	June 19, 2018	Park Yeon-mi	0.220
Jordan questions his trust in Fox News, answers questions from callers with Kobi Libii and sits down with human rights activist and In Order to Live author Yeonmi Park.
123	June 20, 2018	Karamo Brown	0.333
Jordan adds new foes to his lengthy list of enemies, Josh Sharp and Aaron Jackson take down everything in their path, and Karamo Brown discusses Queer Eye.
124	June 21, 2018	Cameron Esposito	0.250
Jordan recognizes America's small-town heroes, applauds Fox News pundit Jeanine Pirro's support for President Trump and sits down with comedian Cameron Esposito.
125	June 25, 2018	Richard Painter	0.335
Jordan questions the future of civil discourse, grapples with the ongoing changes in America and sits down with former White House ethics lawyer Richard Painter.
126	June 26, 2018	Lauren Duca	0.333
Jordan questions President Trump's honesty, sends Laura Grey and Niccole Thurman to investigate Mississippi's sole abortion clinic and chats with Teen Vogue's Lauren Duca.
127	June 27, 2018	Kim Gordon	0.313
Jordan sells products to help freethinkers fight the MSM without him, finds out why Niccole Thurman is leaving the Trump train and chats with musician and actress Kim Gordon.
128	June 28, 2018	None	0.286
On the final show, Jordan finds himself alone since all of his citizen journalists have abandoned him in his time of need. In "Just Between Us", Jordan confides that the conservatives may actually not be the good guys after all. In the final segment, Jordan escapes his studio bunker and has an imaginary sword fight with his liberal enemies. The final shot while the credits roll is Jordan's gaslight being taken away.
