= List of Lambda Theta Alpha chapters =

Lambda Theta Alpha is an American Latina-based college sorority. It was established in 1975 at Kean University. The sorority has both collegiate and alumnae chapters.

== Collegiate chapters ==
In the following list, active chapters are noted in bold and inactive chapters and institutions are in italics.

Chapter	Charter date and range	Institution	Location	Status	Ref.
**Alpha**	December 1975	Kean University	Union Township, New Jersey	Active	
**Beta**	1980	Bloomfield College	Bloomfield, New Jersey	Active	
**Gamma**	1981	The College of New Jersey	Ewing Township, New Jersey	Active	
**Delta**	1986	Seton Hall University	South Orange, New Jersey	Active	
**Epsilon**	1987	Rutgers University–New Brunswick	New Brunswick, New Jersey	Active	
**Zeta**	1987	Stockton University	Galloway Township, New Jersey	Active	
**Eta**	1990	Caldwell College	Caldwell, New Jersey	Active	
**Eta**	1990	Fairleigh Dickinson University	Madison, New Jersey	Active	
**Theta**	1991	Rowan University	Glassboro, New Jersey	Active	
**Iota**	November 3, 1991	Rider University	Lawrence Township, New Jersey	Active	
**Kappa**	1992	University of Connecticut	Storrs, Connecticut	Active	
**Lambda**	1992	Pontifical Catholic University of Puerto Rico	Ponce, Puerto Rico	Active	
Mu	1992–2019	Ramapo College	Mahwah, New Jersey	Inactive	
**Nu**	1992	Montclair State University	Montclair, New Jersey	Inactive	
**Xi**	1992	Manhattan University	The Bronx, New York	Active	(Note: Chapter previously included the College of New Rochelle, which closed in 2019, after the school's bankruptcy.)
**Xi**	1992	Iona University	New Rochelle, New York	Active	(Note: Chapter previously included the College of New Rochelle, which closed in 2019, after the school's bankruptcy.)
Omicron	1992–2001	Upsala College	East Orange, New Jersey	Inactive	(Note: The college closed in 1995.)
**Pi**	1993	West Chester University	West Chester, Pennsylvania	Active	
**Rho**	1993	Rutgers University–Camden	Camden, New Jersey	Active	
Sigma	1993–20xx ?	William Paterson University	Wayne, New Jersey	Inactive	
**Tau**	1994	Monmouth University	West Long Branch, New Jersey	Active	
**Upsilon**	1995	University of Maryland, College Park	College Park, Maryland	Active	
Phi	1995–201x ?	New Jersey Institute of Technology	Newark, New Jersey	Inactive	
Phi	1995–201x ?	Rutgers University–Newark	Newark, New Jersey	Inactive	
**Chi**	1996	University of Florida	Gainesville, Florida	Active	
**Psi**	1996	Central Connecticut State University	New Britain, Connecticut	Active	
Omega				Memorial	
**Beta Alpha**	1996 – 20xx ?	University of Hartford	West Hartford, Connecticut	Inactive	
**Beta Alpha**	1996 – 20xx ?	Trinity College	Hartford, Connecticut	Inactive	
**Beta Beta**	1998	Le Moyne College	DeWitt, New York	Active	
**Beta Gamma**	April 5, 1998	University of South Florida	Tampa, Florida	Active	
**Beta Delta**	1998	California State University, Long Beach	Long Beach, California	Active	
**Beta Epsilon**	1998	Temple University	Philadelphia, Pennsylvania	Active	
**Beta Epsilon**	1998	University of Pennsylvania	Philadelphia, Pennsylvania	Active	
Beta Zeta	1998–20xx ?	Loyola Marymount University	Los Angeles, California	Inactive	
**Beta Eta**	1998	Texas A&M University	College Station, Texas	Active	
**Beta Theta**	1999	University of Central Florida	Orlando, Florida	Active	
Beta Iota	1999–20xx ?	Arizona State University	Tempe, Arizona	Inactive	
**Beta Kappa**	1999	University of Maryland, Baltimore County	Catonsville, Maryland	Active	
**Beta Lambda**	1999	Pennsylvania State University	University Park, Pennsylvania	Active	
**Beta Mu**	January 12, 2000	University of North Texas	Denton, Texas	Active	
**Beta Nu**	2000	University of Texas at Arlington	Arlington, Texas	Active	
**Beta Xi**	2000	San Jose State University	San Jose, California	Active	
**Beta Omicron**	2000	University of Michigan	Ann Arbor, Michigan	Active	
Beta Pi	2000–20xx ?	Eastern Michigan University	Ypsilanti, Michigan	Inactive	
Beta Rho	2000–20xx ?	New Jersey City University	Jersey City, New Jersey	Inactive	
Beta Rho	2000–20xx ?	Saint Peter's University	Jersey City, New Jersey	Inactive	
**Beta Sigma**	2000	University of Miami	Coral Gables, Florida	Active	
Beta Tau	2000–20xx ?	University at Buffalo	Buffalo, New York	Inactive	
Beta Tau	2000–20xx ?	Buffalo State University	Buffalo, New York	Inactive	
Beta Upsilon	2001–20xx ?	Western Connecticut State University	Danbury, Connecticut	Inactive	
**Beta Phi**	2001	University of Illinois Urbana-Champaign	Champaign, Illinois	Active	
Beta Chi	2001–20xx ?	Eastern Illinois University	Charleston, Illinois	Inactive	
**Beta Psi**	2001	Northwestern University	Evanston, Illinois	Active	
**Beta Omega**	2001	Wayne State University	Detroit, Michigan	Active	
**Gamma Alpha**	April 2001	University of Virginia	Charlottesville, Virginia	Active	
Gamma Beta	April 2001 – 20xx ?	Vanderbilt University	Nashville, Tennessee	Inactive	
**Gamma Gamma**	April 28, 2001	University of Tennessee	Knoxville, Tennessee	Active	
**Gamma Delta**	2001	Nova Southeastern University	Davie, Florida	Active	
**Gamma Epsilon**	2001	Florida State University	Tallahassee, Florida	Active	
**Gamma Zeta**	2001	University of California, Riverside	Riverside, California	Active	
**Gamma Eta**	2001	University of Houston	Houston, Texas	Active	
Gamma Theta	2002–2019	Texas A&M University–Corpus Christi	Corpus Christi, Texas	Inactive	
**Gamma Iota**	2002	Florida Atlantic University	Boca Raton, Florida	Active	
**Gamma Kappa**	2002	University of New Mexico	Albuquerque, New Mexico	Active	
**Gamma Lambda**	2002	California State University, Fullerton	Fullerton, California	Active	
**Gamma Mu**	2003	University of Wisconsin–Madison	Madison, Wisconsin	Active	
**Gamma Nu**	2003	Emory University	Atlanta, Georgia	Active	
**Gamma Xi**	2003	Sam Houston State University	Huntsville, Texas	Active	
**Gamma Omicron**	August 23, 2003	University of Washington	Seattle, Washington	Active	
**Gamma Pi**	2003	Florida International University	University Park, Florida	Active	
Gamma Rho	2003–20xx ?	Texas Tech University	Lubbock, Texas	Inactive	
**Gamma Sigma**	2004	California State University, San Bernardino	San Bernardino, California	Active	
Gamma Tau	April 10, 2004 – 20xx ?	California State University, Los Angeles	Los Angeles, California	Inactive	
**Gamma Upsilon**	2004	California State Polytechnic University, Pomona	Pomona, California	Active	
Gamma Phi	2004–20xx ?	Cornell University	Ithaca, New York	Inactive	
**Gamma Chi**	2004	University of Texas at Austin	Austin, Texas	Active	
**Gamma Psi**	2004	San Diego State University	San Diego, California	Active	
**Gamma Omega**	2005	Georgia Tech	Atlanta, Georgia	Active	
**Delta Alpha**	April 10, 2005	University of Georgia	Athens, Georgia	Active	
**Delta Beta**	2005	Georgia State University	Atlanta, Georgia	Active	
Delta Gamma	2005–20xx ?	University of North Carolina at Pembroke	Pembroke, North Carolina	Inactive	
Delta Delta	2005–20xx ?	University of North Carolina Wilmington	Wilmington, North Carolina	Inactive	
**Delta Epsilon**	2005	George Mason University	Fairfax, Virginia	Active	
**Delta Zeta**	2006	Stony Brook University	Stony Brook, New York	Active	
**Delta Eta**	2006	University of Idaho	Moscow, Idaho	Active	
**Delta Theta**	2006	University of California, Santa Barbara	Santa Barbara, California	Active	
Delta Iota	2006–20xx ?	Middle Tennessee State University	Murfreesboro, Tennessee	Inactive	
**Delta Kappa**	2007	St. John's University	Queens, New York City, New York	Active	
**Delta Lambda**	2007	West Virginia University	Morgantown, West Virginia	Active	
**Delta Mu**	2007	Western Illinois University	Macomb, Illinois	Active	
**Delta Nu**	2007	Loyola University Chicago	Chicago, Illinois	Active	
**Delta Xi**	2007	Lewis–Clark State College	Lewiston, Idaho	Active	
**Delta Omicron**	2007	University of California, Berkeley	Berkeley, California	Active	
**Delta Pi**	2007	University of Delaware	Newark, Delaware	Active	
**Delta Rho**	2008	University of California, Los Angeles	Los Angeles, California	Active	
**Delta Sigma**	2008	Texas Wesleyan University	Fort Worth, Texas	Active	
**Delta Tau**	2008	San Francisco State University	San Francisco, California	Active	
**Delta Upsilon**	2008	Lehigh University	Bethlehem, Pennsylvania	Active	
**Delta Phi**	2008	University of Southern California	Los Angeles, California	Active	
**Delta Chi**	2008	California Polytechnic State University, San Luis Obispo	San Luis Obispo, California	Active	
**Delta Psi**	2009	Towson University	Towson, Maryland	Active	
Delta Omega	2009–20xx	California State University, Northridge	Northridge, Los Angeles, California	Inactive	
**Epsilon Alpha**	April 12, 2009	Kennesaw State University	Kennesaw, Georgia	Active	
**Epsilon Beta**	2009	University of Chicago	Chicago, Illinois	Active	
**Epsilon Gamma**	2009	University of Illinois Chicago	Chicago, Illinois	Active	
**Epsilon Delta**	2009	DePaul University	Chicago, Illinois	Active	
**Epsilon Epsilon**	2009	Eastern Washington University	Cheney, Washington	Active	
Epsilon Zeta	2009–2011	University of Vermont	Burlington, Vermont	Inactive	
**Epsilon Eta**	November 21, 2009	Villanova University	Villanova, Pennsylvania	Active	
**Epsilon Theta**	2010	East Carolina University	Greenville, North Carolina	Active	
**Epsilon Iota**	2010	California State Polytechnic University, Humboldt	Arcata, California	Active	
**Epsilon Kappa**	2010	University of Arizona	Tucson, Arizona	Active	
**Epsilon Lambda**	2010	Embry–Riddle Aeronautical University, Daytona Beach	Daytona Beach, Florida	Active	
Epsilon Mu	2010–20xx ?	State University of New York at Oneonta	Oneonta, New York	Inactive	
Epsilon Nu	2011–2018	North Carolina State University	Raleigh, North Carolina	Inactive	
**Epsilon Xi**	2011	California State University, Fresno	Fresno, California	Active	
Epsilon Omicron	2011–20xx ?	Binghamton University	Binghamton, New York	Inactive	
**Epsilon Pi**	2011	Michigan State University	East Lansing, Michigan	Active	
**Epsilon Rho**	2011	Texas Christian University	Fort Worth, Texas	Active	
Epsilon Sigma	May 24, 2012 – 20xx ?	University of California, Irvine	Irvine, California	Inactive	
**Epsilon Tau**	2012	Lewis University	Romeoville, Illinois	Active	
**Epsilon Upsilon**	2012	University of California, Davis	Davis, California	Active	
**Epsilon Phi**	October 20, 2012	University of North Carolina at Charlotte	Charlotte, North Carolina	Active	
Epsilon Chi	2012–20xx ?	University of California, Santa Cruz	Santa Cruz, California	Inactive	
**Epsilon Psi**	2012	University at Albany, SUNY	Albany, New York	Active	
**Epsilon Omega**	2013	University of Memphis	Memphis, Tennessee	Active	
**Zeta Alpha**	2013	Virginia Commonwealth University	Richmond, Virginia	Active	
**Zeta Beta**	2013	University of West Georgia	Carrollton, Georgia	Active	
**Zeta Gamma**	2014	Iowa State University	Ames, Iowa	Active	
**Zeta Delta**	2014	Boise State University	Boise, Idaho	Active	
**Zeta Epsilon**	2014	Syracuse University	Syracuse, New York	Active	
**Zeta Zeta**	2014	California State University, East Bay	Hayward, California	Active	
**Zeta Eta**	2015	Idaho State University	Pocatello, Idaho	Active	
**Zeta Theta**	2015	Johnson C. Smith University	Charlotte, North Carolina	Active	
**Zeta Iota**	2015	Heritage University	Toppenish, Washington	Active	
**Zeta Kappa**	2015	State University of New York at Plattsburgh	Plattsburgh, New York	Active	
**Zeta Lambda**	2015	Western Michigan University	Kalamazoo, Michigan	Active	
**Zeta Mu**	2015	Duke University	Durham, North Carolina	Active	
**Zeta Nu**	2015	Hofstra University	Hempstead, New York	Active	
Zeta Xi	2016–2020	University of Missouri	Columbia, Missouri	Inactive	
**Zeta Omicron**	2016	Southern Illinois University Carbondale	Carbondale, Illinois	Active	
**Zeta Pi**	2016	Salisbury University	Salisbury, Maryland	Active	
**Zeta Rho**	2016	University of Texas Rio Grande Valley	Edinburg, Texas	Active	
**Zeta Sigma**	2016	Washington State University	Pullman, Washington	Active	
**Zeta Tau**	2017	Aurora University	Aurora, Illinois	Active	
**Zeta Upsilon**	2017	Northern Illinois University	DeKalb, Illinois	Active	
**Zeta Phi**	2017	Denison University	Granville, Ohio	Active	
**Zeta Chi**	2017	University of Northern Colorado	Greeley, Colorado	Active	
**Zeta Psi**	April 29, 2017	California State University, Dominguez Hills	Carson, California	Active	
**Zeta Omega**	April 7, 2018	University of North Carolina at Greensboro	Greensboro, North Carolina	Active	
Eta Alpha	2018–2023	University of Northern Iowa	Cedar Falls, Iowa	Inactive	
**Eta Beta**	2018	State University of New York at Cortland	Cortland, New York	Active	
**Eta Gamma**	May 11, 2019	University of California, San Diego	San Diego, California	Active	
**Eta Delta**	2019	California State University, Sacramento	Sacramento, California	Active	
**Eta Epsilon**	October 31, 2020	California State University, Chico	Chico, California	Active	
**Eta Zeta**	November 13, 2020	Stephen F. Austin State University	Nacogdoches, Texas	Active	
**Eta Eta**	November 28, 2021	George Washington University	Washington, D.C.	Active	
**Eta Theta**	November 4, 2022	Ohio State University	Columbus, Ohio	Active	
**Eta Iota**	November 2, 2024	Louisiana State University	Baton Rouge, Louisiana	Active	
**Eta Kappa**	March 28, 2025	University of Tennessee, Chattanooga	Chattanooga, Tennessee	Active	
**Eta Lambda**	April 11, 2025	Bradley University	Peoria, Illinois	Active	
**Eta Mu**	April 12, 2025	Stetson University	DeLand, Florida	Active	
**Eta Nu**	April 18, 2025	University of Colorado, Boulder	Boulder, Colorado	Active	
**Eta Xi**	October 31, 2025	Oglethorpe University	Brookhaven, Georgia	Active	
**Eta Omicron**	March 7, 2026	The University of the District of Columbia	Washington, D.C.	Active	
**Eta Pi**	Spring 2026	Stevens Institute of Technology	Hoboken, New Jersey	Active	
**Eta Rho**	April 4, 2026	Augusta University	Augusta, Georgia	Active	
**Eta Sigma**	Spring 2026	Yale University	New Haven, Connecticut	Active	
**Eta Tau**	Spring 2026	Virginia Polytechnic Institute	Blacksburg, Virginia	Active	
**Eta Upsilon**	Spring 2026	Purdue University	West Lafayette, Indiana	Active	
**Eta Phi**	Spring 2026	Oregon State University	Benton County, Oregon	Active	
**Eta Chi**	Fall 2026	The College of William and Mary	Williamsburg, Virginia	Active	

== Alumnae Chapters ==
Lambda Theta Alpha has designated the Alpha Alpha and Alpha Alpha Alpha series chapter names for alumnae clubs.

Chapter	Location	Status	Ref.
Alpha Alpha	New Brunswick, New Jersey	Active	
Alpha Beta	Hartford, Connecticut	Active	
Alpha Gamma	Austin, Texas	Active	
Alpha Delta	Silver Spring, Maryland	Active	
Alpha Epsilon	New York City, New York	Active	
Alpha Zeta	Fort Lauderdale, Florida	Active	
Alpha Eta	Los Angeles, California	Active	
Alpha Theta	Seattle, Washington	Active	
Alpha Iota	Nashville, Tennessee	Active	
Alpha Kappa	Madison, Wisconsin	Active	
Alpha Lambda	Chicago, Illinois	Active	
Alpha Mu	Detroit, Michigan	Active	
Alpha Nu	Philadelphia, Pennsylvania	Active	
Alpha Xi	Alexandria, Virginia	Active	
Alpha Omicron	Phoenix, Arizona	Active	
Alpha Pi	Boston, Massachusetts	Active	
Alpha Rho	Raleigh, North Carolina	Active	
Alpha Sigma	Atlanta, Georgia	Active	
Alpha Tau	Albuquerque, New Mexico	Active	
Alpha Upsilon	Orlando, Florida	Active	
Alpha Phi	Dallas, Texas	Active	
Alpha Chi	San Francisco, California	Active	
Alpha Psi	Denver, Colorado	Active	
Alpha Omega	Paterson, New Jersey	Active	
Alpha Alpha Alpha	Houston, Texas	Active	
Alpha Alpha Beta	San Diego, California	Active	
Alpha Alpha Gamma	Atlantic City, New Jersey	Active	
Alpha Alpha Delta	Charlotte, North Carolina	Active	
Alpha Alpha Epsilon	Tri-Cities, Washington	Active	
Alpha Alpha Zeta	Richmond, Virginia	Active	
Alpha Alpha Eta	Puerto Rico	Active	
