= Freedom University =

Modern freedom school for undocumented immigrants

- Atlanta, Georgia; Southern United States

Information
- Other name: Freedom U
- Established: 2011
- Director: Dr. Laura Emiko Soltis
- Website: https://freedom-university.org/

Freedom University (Freedom U or FU) is a modern-day Freedom School in Atlanta, Georgia. Freedom U provides tuition-free college preparation classes, college and scholarship application assistance, and social movement leadership training to undocumented youth unable to access higher education in Georgia due to the state's out-of-state tuition requirement. The school formed in 2011 in response to the University System of Georgia's passage of a policy banning undocumented students from the state's top public universities.

Freedom U students attend classes in undisclosed locations throughout Atlanta.

== History ==
Four University of Georgia (UGA) professors and five UGA students founded Freedom U in 2011 after the Jessica Colotl controversy ignited state and national debates over the educational rights of young undocumented people. Many Georgians felt undocumented students threatened the admission of U.S. citizens to its universities. The University System of Georgia Board of Regents (USG BOR) summarized three concerns: "that the University System was being swamped by thousands of undocumented students, that Georgia taxpayers were subsidizing the education of these students through in-state tuition, and that undocumented students were taking seats in college from academically qualified Georgians".

In response to those concerns, during the summer of 2010, a USG BOR committee reviewed all 310,000 students enrolled in University System of Georgia institutions in the fall, and "found only 501 undocumented students enrolled in the system, with all paying out-of-state tuition, which is set at the full cost of instruction". The USG BOR then passed Policies 4.1.6 and 4.3.4 in 2011. Policy 4.1.6 banned undocumented students from the state's top public universities. At the time of passage, this included Georgia Tech, Georgia State University, University of Georgia, Augusta University, and Georgia College & State University. Policy 4.3.4 required institutions to "verify lawful presence," ensuring no undocumented persons received in-state tuition benefits. The USG BOR's ban began the year the University of Georgia celebrated 50 years of an integrated student body.

=== Founding and early years, 2011-2014 ===
Freedom U opened in Athens, Georgia, on October 9, 2011, as a direct response to legislative actions to exclude undocumented students from access to Georgia's public universities. Local undocumented students, community leaders, founding faculty, UGA students, and various local and national activists and organizations, including Atlanta's Georgia Undocumented Youth Alliance and Athens' Economic Justice Coalition began to organize a response to the policy. After hearing from affected youth that they most desired to continue their education, a community leader had the idea to open a school. Professors and students came up with the name Freedom University to honor the history of Southern Freedom Schools and their instrumental role in the civil rights movement.

Classes took place on Sundays in undisclosed donated spaces throughout Athens because the KKK had threatened the fledgling school. Members of the UGA and Athens communities arranged transportation and raised money for textbooks.

Writer Junot Diaz sat on the advisory board of this first incarnation of Freedom University, helping to publicize its existence and mission on the national stage. By spring 2014, all four founding professors ceased being involved with Freedom University, three of the four leaving for posts at Ivy League universities.

=== Move to Atlanta and growth, 2014-present ===
In the summer of 2014, Laura Emiko Soltis, a human rights activist-scholar who had just received her PhD from Emory, became Freedom University's first executive director. That summer Freedom University relocated to Atlanta to be more centrally located to the majority of the state's undocumented population. The move also allowed Freedom U to call on Atlanta's long history and infrastructure of civil rights movement community.

Under Soltis's leadership, Freedom University adopted a human rights framework and student-centered activist direction. Freedom U classes also took on a more formal structure. Soltis expanded the curriculum to include more arts classes and college preparatory instruction as well as mental health counseling. During this time, the school grew from serving 30 to 40 enrolled students.

Freedom University continues to meet for weekend classes in changing, unpublicized locations throughout Atlanta. As of 2020, the school serves a community of 25 undocumented students who emigrated from countries in South America, Asia, and Africa. Most came to the U.S. as young children with families fleeing various forms of economic oppression and violence in their native countries.

As the school's Community Engagement and Volunteer Coordinator, Arizbeth Sanchez became Freedom University's first undocumented staff member. Freedom U employs two full-time staff members who are undocumented.

Three of the founders of Freedom University speak at MIT Media Lab in 2018

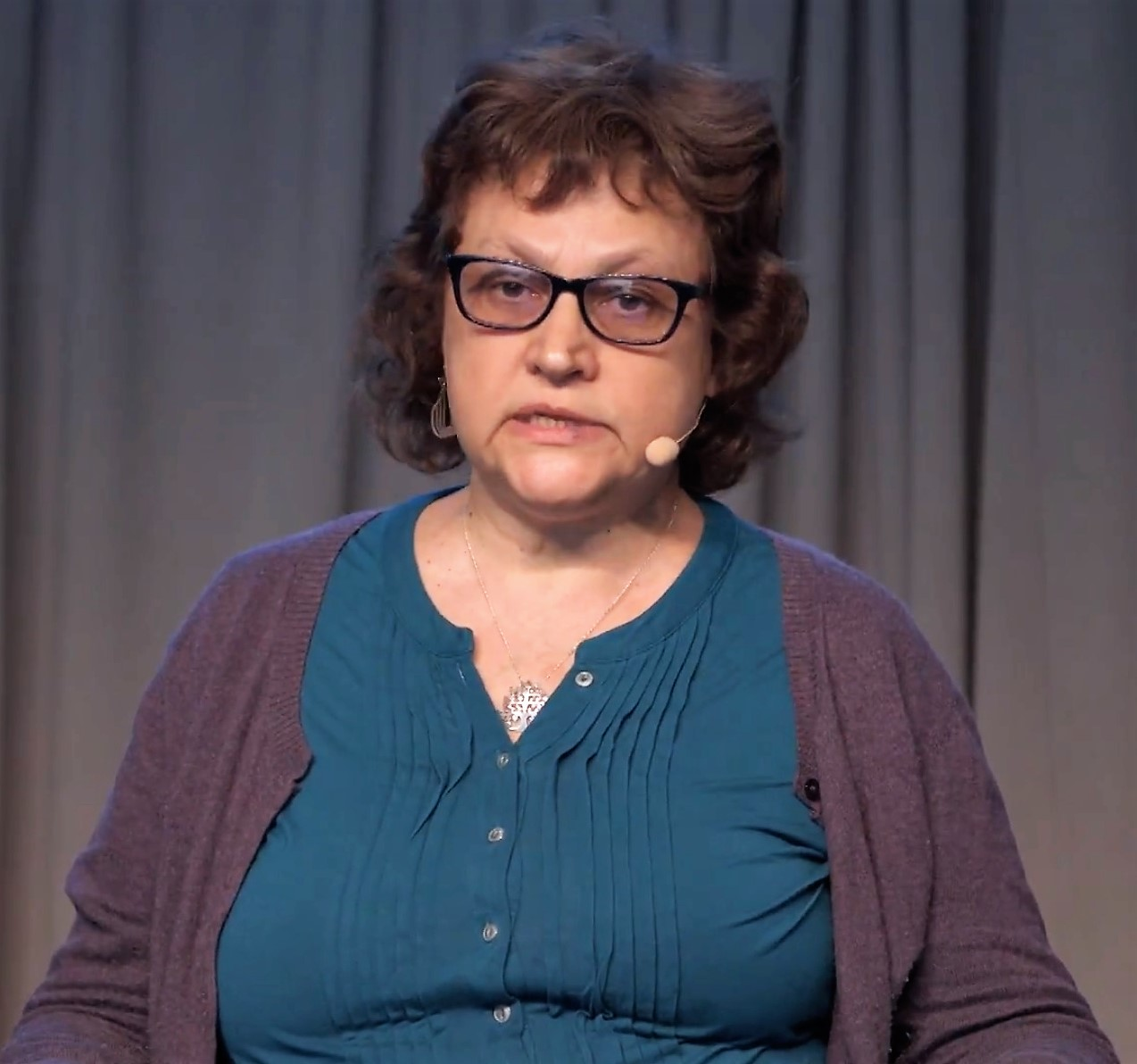
Bettina Kaplan

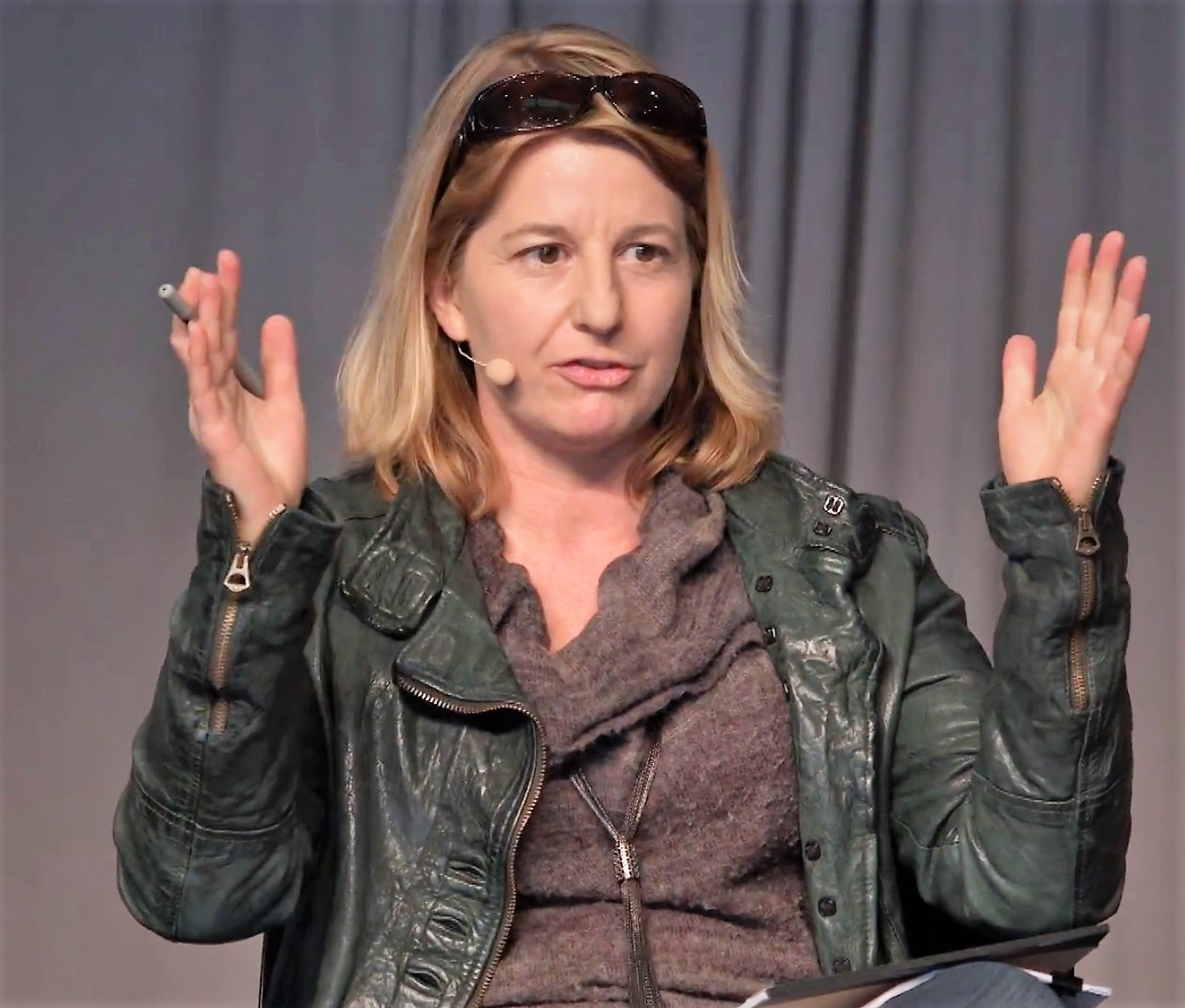
Bethany Moreton

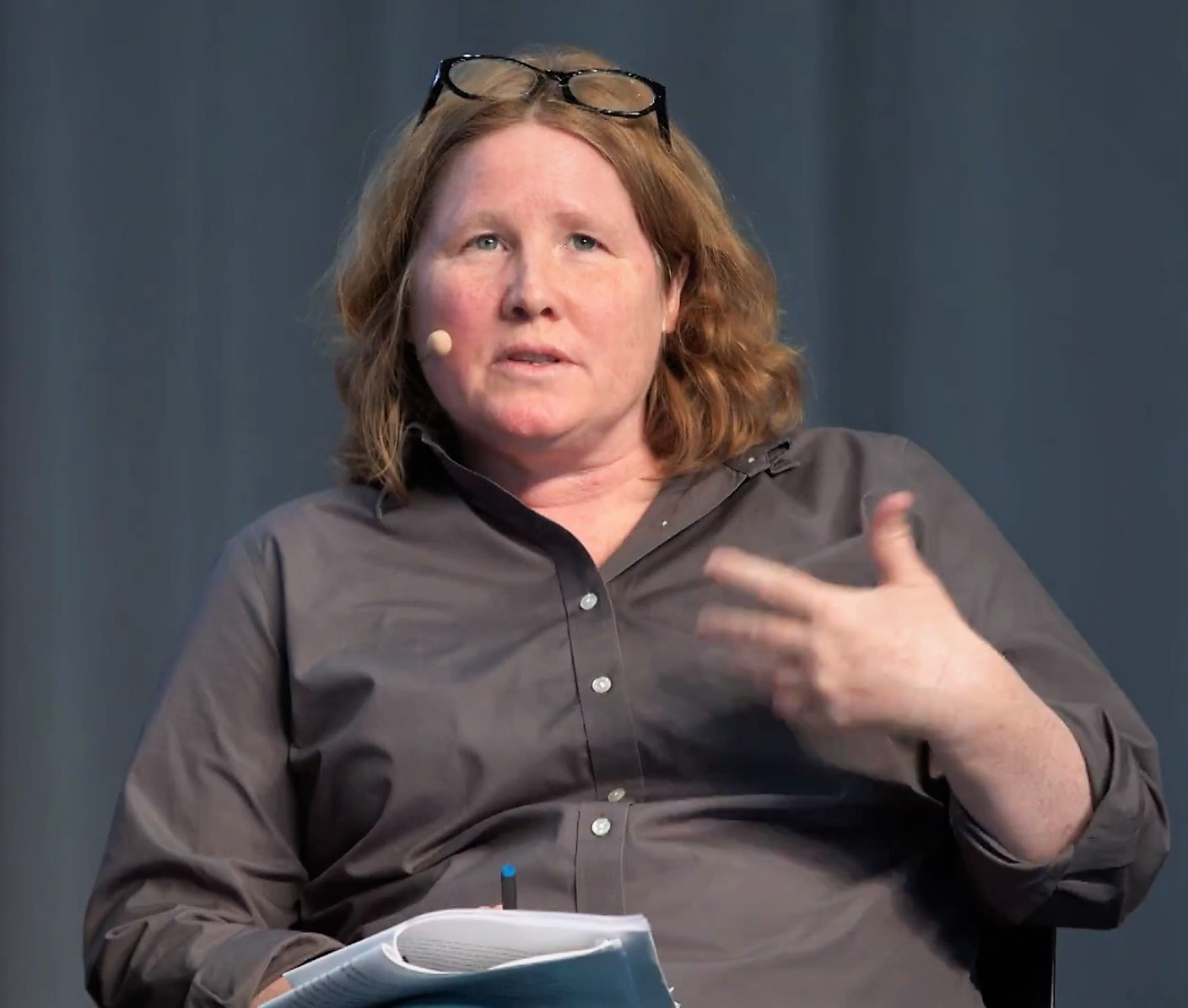
Pamela Voekel

== Pedagogy ==
Since 2014, Freedom U has enacted an experiential, liberatory pedagogy based on dialogue, democratic participation, an intersectional human rights framework, and civil rights movement strategies. In addition to offering science, math, history, art, and music courses, FU teaches its students to become social movement leaders. Learners uncover the significance of their life experiences in the context of the complex sociocultural history of immigration, labor, racism, and segregation. Freedom U enacts the belief that access to education is a basic human right.

Students often cite the school's son jarocho music class and performance group as a favorite aspect of their Freedom U experience.

Freedom U students participate in decisions about their learning trajectory and what classes they would like to take. This participatory model encourages agency and peer learning, disrupting the traditional dynamic of teacher as ultimate authority and dispenser of knowledge.

== Public activism ==
Freedom University engages in advocacy and education around how citizenship is understood, integrating discussion of slavery, apartheid, and labor exploitation in the United States, particularly in the Jim Crow South, and throughout the world.

Freedom U has collaborated with civil rights leaders such as Lonnie King, John Lewis, Rita Schwerner Bender, Roslyn Pope, Loretta Ross, and Charles Black in educating and helping students perform civil disobedience actions. At these public events, students often wear painted monarch butterfly wings to symbolize the naturalness of migration and their experience as immigrants.

In 2015, several Freedom U student activists were arrested for integrating a University of Georgia classroom on the anniversary of the university's desegregation. That same year, Freedom University students debated against the UGA Debate Union over whether college admissions processes should consider an applicant's national origin. Freedom U students argued that colleges should be able to consider national origin while UGA students argued against the practice.

Freedom University students, faculty, and allies continue to attend random University System of Georgia Board of Regent's meetings to protest the discriminatory policies. In 2019, several faith leaders and Comedy Central comedian Jordan Klepper were arrested for joining Freedom U faculty and students at one such demonstration.

== Recognition and social impact ==
On March 4, 2019, Atlanta City Council honored Freedom University's work to educate and empower undocumented youth in the city.

In 2018, one out of three Freedom U students secured a full-ride scholarship to a college or university outside of Georgia. In 2019, half of its graduating students secured full scholarships.

Beyond securing higher education funding and access for its own students, Freedom University's education and advocacy campaigns have resulted in several private universities in the U.S. changing their admissions policies. These changes open doors for all future undocumented applicants.

Freedom U's coalition building efforts at Emory University resulted in Emory's 2015 decision to begin accepting DACA recipients. In 2017, Emory further revised their policy to admit qualified undocumented students, regardless of DACA status.

Activism also influenced the Board of Regents to remove, in 2016, Georgia State University and Augusta University from the list of Georgia public universities banning undocumented students.

Some Georgia lawmakers recognize how its exclusionary policies harm the state's economy and contribute to a "brain drain". After Georgia has invested in the public K-12 educations of undocumented youth, many leave the state to pursue higher education and work elsewhere. Larry Gordon of PBS quoted Freedom U student and activist Jacqueline Delgadillo: "It's a loss for our state. It doesn’t make sense to me how [state officials] are OK with so many students going out of state and then contributing to other states." Since three of the four founding professors have left Georgia for Northeastern states, there is also a concern of a brain drain of academics from Georgia.
