= Tim Baltz =

American comedian, actor, and writer

- Born: Timothée Joseph Baltz; February 28, 1981 (age 45); Joliet, Illinois, U.S.
- Education: Loyola University Chicago
- Occupations: Comedian, actor
- Years active: 2008–present
- Known for: Shrink; The Opposition with Jordan Klepper; The Righteous Gemstones
- Spouse: Lily Sullivan (m. 2022)
- Children: 1

Tim Baltz is an American comedian, actor, and writer. He appeared as a "citizen journalist" on the Comedy Central series The Opposition with Jordan Klepper. He starred on the HBO series The Righteous Gemstones.

== Early life ==
Born Timothée Joseph Baltz in Joliet, Illinois, Baltz graduated from Joliet Central High School in 1999. His mother is French. Baltz graduated from Loyola University Chicago. Before pursuing a career in comedy, Baltz planned on attending graduate school to study French.

== Career ==
Baltz began his training as a comedian at The Second City in Chicago, where he first met Jordan Klepper. In 2011, he performed in the Second City e.t.c.'s 35th revue: Sky's The Limit Weather (Weather Permitting), for which he earned a Joseph Jefferson Award.

He also trained at the iO Theater in Chicago. He regularly appeared on the Comedy Central series Drunk History, and also made appearances on Veep, Better Call Saul, and Parks and Recreation. He played a realtor on the Seeso series Bajillion Dollar Propertie$.

With Ted Tremper, he co-created Shrink, a comedy TV series for which the pilot originally premiered at the New York Television Festival, where it won "Best Comedy Pilot" and the "Critics Award". In 2016, it was ordered to be made into a full series by NBC, and premiered on Seeso in March 2017. Baltz stars in the series as David Tracey, a recent graduate from medical school who, after failing to obtain a residency, decides to become a therapist instead.

Baltz has also appeared on the podcast Comedy Bang! Bang! many times as an improviser, and hosts the call-in advice podcast Hey Randy! on CBB Presents as his character Randy Snutz.

== Personal life ==
Baltz married fellow actress/comedian Lily Sullivan in February 2022.

== Filmography ==
=== Film ===
Year	Title	Role	Notes
2014	Warren	Billy	
2015	Bloomin Mud Shuffle	Bobby	
2016	Mascots	South Dixie Air Ticket Agent	
2024	The American Society of Magical Negroes	Officer Miller	
2025	Driver's Ed	Officer Walsh	

=== Television ===
Year	Title	Role	Notes
2008	Stephen Fry in America	Himself	Episode: "Mississippi"
2013	Tough Season	Brad Blevins	Episode: "Week One Panic"
2014	Chicago P.D.	Peterson	Episode: "A Material Witness"
2014	Veep	Craig Jergensen	Episode: "Clovis"
2014–2016	Drunk History	Various	20 episodes
2015	Parks and Recreation	Zach Harrison	Episode: "William Henry Harrison"
2015	Sirens	Super-Jim	Episode: "Superdick"
2015	Better Call Saul	Roland J. Cox	Episode: "Alpine Shepherd Boy"
2016	Superstore	Indecisive Shopper	Episode: "Color Wars"
2016	Comedy Bang! Bang!	Martin Moreland	Episode: "Ben Folds Wears a Black Button Down and Jeans"
2016	Dumb Prince	Prince Marco	Television film
2016, 2017	Animals.	Traitor Drug Dealer / Scott (voice)	2 episodes
2016–2019	Bajillion Dollar Propertie$	Glenn Bouchard	34 episodes
2017	Shrink	David Tracey	8 episodes; also writer, producer, and creator
2017	Fresh Off the Boat	Ted	Episode: "The Masters"
2017	Will vs. the Future	Camper Darren	Television film
2017–2018	The Opposition with Jordan Klepper	Himself	50 episodes
2019–2025	The Righteous Gemstones	Benjamin Jason "BJ" Barnes	Main cast
2019	The Unicorn	Mr. Kersey	Episode: "No Small Parts"
2019–2020	American Housewife	Dane	3 episodes
2020	The Conners	Wyatt	Episode: "Throwing a Christian to a Bear"
2023	Bob's Burgers	Billy (voice)	Episode: "Cheaty Cheaty Bang Bang"
2023	History of the World, Part II	Lt. Henry Honeybeard	3 episodes
2024	The Great North	Graham (voice)	Episode: "You've Got Sail Adventure"
2024–2025	Big City Greens	Ernie (voice)	2 episodes
2025	Deli Boys	Director Simpson	6 episodes
2025	I Love LA	Antoine	2 episodes
2025	St. Denis Medical	Husband	Episode: "Aloha, Everyone"
2026	High Potential	Glen Gannick	Episode: "In the Driver's Seat"
2026	Strip Law	(voice)	Episode: "Finale: A Show About Lawyers"
2026	Widow's Bay	William	Episode: "Lodging"
TBA	The People v. Gorilla Grodd	TBA	Filming
