= Klepper (TV series) =

American documentary television series

- Genre: Documentary; Comedy
- Created by: Jordan Klepper
- Presented by: Jordan Klepper
- Country of origin: United States
- Original language: English
- No. of seasons: 1
- No. of episodes: 8

Production
- Executive producers: Jordan Klepper; Trevor Noah; Stuart Miller; Kim Gamble; Kirsten Ames
- Running time: 21 minutes

Original release
- Network: Comedy Central
- Release: May 9 – June 20, 2019

Related
- The Daily Show; The Opposition with Jordan Klepper

Klepper is an American television docuseries hosted by Jordan Klepper. It is his second series for Comedy Central following the end of The Opposition with Jordan Klepper in 2018. Klepper premiered on May 9, 2019.

== Premise ==
Klepper follows Jordan Klepper operating outside of the studio in the field. He travels across the United States and shares conversations with real people.

== Production ==
On June 15, 2018, Comedy Central announced that it was canceling The Opposition with Jordan Klepper after one season, but that Klepper would be hosting a new primetime weekly talk show. Klepper would be stepping away from the traditional late-night desk and out exploring various communities in the United States to learn about various issues that are impacting the country. Each episode will be accompanied by a filmed podcast in which Klepper and the series producers discuss behind the scenes, and how their perspectives have changed as a result.

During filming of the series, Klepper was arrested during a Board of Regents meeting at the Georgia State Capitol at a protest about undocumented students. Shortly after he was released on bail, Klepper released the following statement on his social media, "Yesterday I learned many things. Police cars are not built for lanky giraffe bodies was one. Another, there are good people fighting good fights across this land. In Georgia they are denying college admission and tuition benefits to undocumented students. These are students who pay taxes, grew up here and want to learn and give back to their community. We need more thoughtful, curious, educated young adults dedicated to making this place better. Education is a human right. Places like Freedom University are fighting the good fight. I was honored to stand with them and the other community faith leaders, teachers and protestors. Education not segregation. Sounds like a smart idea. If you think so, let the Georgia Board of Regents know."

== Episodes ==
No.	Title	Original release date	U.S. viewers (millions)
1	"Wrestling PTSD"	May 9, 2019	0.218
Jordan jumps in the ring with Valhalla, a group of military veterans who use professional wrestling to deal with PTSD. In Killeen, Texas, home to America’s largest military base, he learns that veterans struggle to get the care they need to deal with the transition of returning home from war. For the guys in Valhalla, wrestling is more than a physical outlet, it is a rally point for all veterans to come together and slam their trauma–and potentially Jordan–through a table.
2	"Battle in the Bayou"	May 16, 2019	0.196
Jordan goes overboard in Louisiana when he joins a direct action protest of a major oil pipeline. Camping out with environmentalist group L’eau La Vie, Jordan meets the brave activists who chain themselves to bulldozers to protect the swamp. However, he soon learns that not everyone in the bayou supports these illegal protests and that most locals would prefer a job.
3	"Underground University"	May 23, 2019	0.221
Jordan goes back to school with undocumented immigrant students banned from enrolling in colleges in Georgia. At Freedom U, young Latinx immigrants attend class in secret and fight the state’s Board of Regents for their right to an education. After spending time with the kids in Atlanta, Jordan joins an act of civil disobedience that ends with a TMZ mugshot and a new perspective on privilege.
4	"Deported Fucking Vets"	May 27, 2019	0.331
Jordan crosses the border into Tijuana to meet US military veterans who have been deported. From a cinder block bunker, the exiled vets fight to appeal to America’s supposedly limitless support for the troops but issues of immigration, criminal records and old-fashioned politics block their path home. Jordan learns that the vets' only advocate might be a 70-year-old Marine driving across the country in an RV.
5	"Invisible Nation"	May 30, 2019	0.211
Jordan follows Representative Deb Haaland as she makes history as one of the first Native American women elected to Congress. Inspired by a study that exposed staggering inequality experienced by indigenous populations, Jordan heads to Michigan, Wisconsin and New Mexico to understand modern Native American invisibility and his own role in a damaging stereotype.
6	"This is My Gun, These Are My Rights"	June 6, 2019	0.255
Jordan and Kobi Libii head to Texas to join two different groups of activists who use guns to get their message across. In Gonzales, Jordan meets Second Amendment die hards who see themselves as civil rights activists just like Martin Luther King Jr. Meanwhile, Kobi embeds with Guerilla Mainframe, an African-American group that uses guns and provocative tactics to draw attention to police violence against minorities.
7	"America First, Mars Next"	June 13, 2019	0.197
Jordan visits the front lines of America’s new space race and is sad to see how far we have fallen. As a kid, he idolized NASA in all its glory, from Apollo to shuttle launches at Cape Canaveral to freeze-dried ice cream. Today’s program is defined by clunky bureaucracy, private billionaire spaceports, and begging Russia for a ride into orbit. However, there is hope: an IG-friendly teen in Florida and a grumpy old astronaut in Houston are taking a new moonshot, and Jordan’s biggest ally might be none other than the President of the United States.
8	"The New Weed War"	June 20, 2019	0.220
Jordan heads to the home of The Chronic to meet African-American entrepreneurs trying to break into the marijuana industry. While the west coast’s current reputation for liberal drug laws and progressive politics makes headlines, the reality of legalization–and who benefits–more closely resembles America’s discriminatory past. In anti-pot Compton and bud-loving Oakland, Jordan tries to square the chronic of his youth with the inequality of today.

== See also ==
- The Opposition with Jordan Klepper
