= The Opposition with Jordan Klepper =

- Genre: Comedy; News satire; Talk show
- Created by: Jordan Klepper; Trevor Noah
- Directed by: Chuck O'Neil
- Presented by: Jordan Klepper
- Theme music composer: Ty Segall
- Country of origin: United States
- Original language: English
- No. of seasons: 1
- No. of episodes: 128 (list of episodes)

Production
- Executive producers: Jordan Klepper; Stuart Miller; Trevor Noah
- Production locations: Hotel Pennsylvania, New York City
- Running time: 21 minutes
- Production companies: Ark Angel; Comedy Partners

Original release
- Network: Comedy Central
- Release: September 25, 2017 – June 28, 2018

Related
- The Daily Show; Klepper

The Opposition with Jordan Klepper is an American late-night talk and news satire program that aired on Comedy Central from September 25, 2017, to June 28, 2018. The show was hosted by comedian Jordan Klepper, a former correspondent on The Daily Show, and satirized right-wing politics. It aired each Monday through Thursday at 11:30 pm (EST), following The Daily Show.

On June 15, 2018, Comedy Central announced that it was canceling the show after one season, but that Klepper would be hosting a new primetime weekly talk show, Klepper.

== Production ==
Jordan Klepper served as a correspondent on The Daily Show for three years. Klepper's segments on the show received positive reviews. During his time on the show, he substituted for Trevor Noah in October 2016. In April 2017, Comedy Central announced that Klepper would host a new show, debuting in the fall, that would follow The Daily Show. In July 2017, the title of the show was revealed to be The Opposition with Jordan Klepper, and had a premiere scheduled for September 25, 2017.

On June 15, 2018, Comedy Central announced the show would be ending after its June 28 episode.

=== Cast ===
Klepper served as host. The show had "citizen journalists", which is a concept similar to The Daily Show's correspondents: Josh Sharp, Aaron Jackson, Laura Grey, Kobi Libii, Niccole Thurman and Tim Baltz.

=== Writers ===
The show was written by Jordan Klepper, Ian Berger, Owen Parsons, Russ Armstrong, Kristen Acimovic, River Clegg, Chelsea Davison, Chelsea Devantez, Pia Glenn, Asher Perlman, Justin Tyler, Steve Waltien, Seth Weitberg, and Keisha Zollar.

== Reception ==
On Metacritic, season one of The Opposition with Jordan Klepper has an average weighted score of 56 out of 100, based on four critics, indicating "mixed or average reviews" from critics. On review aggregator website Rotten Tomatoes, the first season has an approval rating of 71% based on seven reviews, with an average rating of 6.2/10.

=== Awards and nominations ===
Year	Award	Category	Nominees	Result	Ref.
2018	GLAAD Media Award	Outstanding Talk Show Episode (for "Danica Roem")	Jordan Klepper, Stuart Miller, Trevor Noah	Nominated	

== See also ==
- Lights Out with David Spade, successor in timeslot
- The Nightly Show with Larry Wilmore, predecessor in timeslot
- The Colbert Report, predecessor in timeslot
