= The American Society of Magical Negroes =

2024 film by Kobi Libii

- Theatrical release poster
- Directed by: Kobi Libii
- Written by: Kobi Libii
- Produced by: Julia Lebedev; Eddie Vaisman; Angel Lopez; Kobi Libii
- Starring: Justice Smith; David Alan Grier; An-Li Bogan
- Cinematography: Doug Emmett
- Edited by: Brian Olds
- Music by: Michael Abels
- Production companies: Sight Unseen; Juba Lane
- Distributed by: Focus Features (US); Universal Pictures (outside US)
- Release dates: January 19, 2024 (Sundance); March 15, 2024 (United States)
- Running time: 105 minutes
- Country: United States
- Language: English
- Box office: $2.5 million

The American Society of Magical Negroes is a 2024 American comedy film that satirizes the Magical Negro trope in featuring a young man who joins a clandestine group of magical African Americans committed to enhancing the lives of white people. It was written and directed by Kobi Libii in his feature-film debut, and it stars Justice Smith, David Alan Grier, and An-Li Bogan.

The film was a production by Sight Unseen and Juba Lane, with Kobi Libii serving as one of its four producers. The collaboration involved production designer Laura Fox, cinematographer Doug Emmett, editor Brian Olds, and composer Michael Abels. Filming primarily took place in the Arts District of Los Angeles, with the Los Angeles Theater serving as a key location for the secretive Institute's scenes. The production design juxtaposed the Institute's historic and magical atmosphere with the high-tech, satirical environment of MeetBox. Cinematography drew inspiration from classic "Magical Negro" films, blending Afro-centric visual elements with modern techniques.

It premiered on January 19, 2024 at the 2024 Sundance Film Festival, and Focus Features released it in theaters in the United States on March 15, 2024. The film grossed $2.5 million at the box office. It received mixed reviews from critics. Rotten Tomatoes reported that critics noted that while it presented an intriguing concept, it fell short of thoroughly exploring its most challenging notions.

== Plot ==
Aren, a young biracial African-American man, displays his yarn sculpture at an art gallery, facing rejection; no one buys his work. Advised by the white gallery owner to approach a specific patron, Aren is mistaken for a waiter and handed an empty glass. At the bar, African-American bartender Roger empathizes with Aren's experience.

Discouraged, Aren discards his sculpture and heads home. On the way, he encounters a drunk white woman struggling with an ATM. She asks him for help, but he's falsely accused of theft, leading to a physical confrontation with two white men. Roger intervenes, deftly defusing the situation with a barbecue-restaurant recommendation and prompting one of the men to say, "No hard feelings, okay?"

Roger introduces Aren to The American Society of Magical Negroes, a group aiming to safeguard African Americans by appeasing white people. Aren witnesses historical acts of reassurance by Black men towards whites, embodying the Society's mission. Under Roger's mentorship, Aren helps a shy white police officer gain confidence at a dance club.

A chance encounter with Lizzie, a woman with a multiethnic background, at a coffee shop leads Aren to develop feelings for her, even as he's called away for Society duties. The society arranges a job for him at MeetBox, a social media platform, where he's assigned to reassure Jason, a depressed white colleague. Aren discovers that they collaborate with Lizzie, who also works there.

Amidst his growing friendship with Lizzie, Aren learns of MeetBox's racial recognition flaws, and the company's superficial response highlights systemic issues. Noting Aren's feelings for Lizzie—whom Jason also likes—Roger tells Aren he must focus on boosting Jason's career and love life, sacrificing his own happiness.

MeetBox prepares a global broadcast to its staff to outline its new diversity-embracing policies. Jason is appointed a co-presenter, and invites Aren to join him. However, as the presentation begins, Aren learns that he was invited so the company would appear more diversity-conscious. He interrupts the live presentation, challenging the company's woke façade, and asserting that he has the right to belong to society without apology or special treatment. His defiance shocks his colleagues and disrupts the Society's magic. Aren is transported back to Society headquarters, where its president, DeDe, tells him he is to be expelled and his memory of them erased.

Despite Roger's attempt to erase Aren's memories, the magic weakens, signaling a broader rebellion within the Society against their subservient roles. Aren reunites with Lizzie in Los Angeles, where they reconcile and happily walk off together—while Lizzie, apparently joking, tells him she belongs to a magical society of her own. In a coda, she enters a hair salon and accesses a secret entrance to the Society of Supportive Wives and Girlfriends (SOSWAG).

== Cast ==
- Justice Smith as Aren
- David Alan Grier as Roger
- An-Li Bogan as Lizzie
- Drew Tarver as Jason
- Michaela Watkins as Masterson
- Aisha Hinds as Gabbard
- Tim Baltz as Officer Miller
- Rupert Friend as Mick
- Nicole Byer as DeDe

== Production ==
=== Overview ===
The American Society of Magical Negroes is written and directed by Kobi Libii in his feature-film debut. Libii began writing the concept in 2016 as a two-and-a-half-minute comedy sketch. He developed the concept as a potential film in 2019 as part of the Sundance Institute's Screenwriters and Directors Labs. Libii saw the trope of the Magical Negro as a stock character that lacked "an inner life" and was "relentlessly focused on helping this white character grow in most cases". Libii said, "I found it so absurd and incorrect and funny that I wanted to blow it out and criticize it, but also use it as a way to talk about other stuff." Libii met Justice Smith at the labs and eventually cast him as the film's protagonist. He also cast David Alan Grier as the guide to the protagonist, seeing him as iconic from his upbringing and wanting him in a central role. Libii said 90% of the film was filmed in Arts District, Los Angeles.

The film was a production by Sight Unseen and Juba Lane, and Libii was one of the film's four producers. Among the crew members were cinematographer Doug Emmett, editor Brian Olds, composer Michael Abels, and production designer Laura Fox.

=== Cinematography ===
Doug Emmett, known for his work on The Edge of Seventeen and Sorry to Bother You, collaborated closely with director Kobi Libii to craft a visual style that blended elements of classic "Black savior" films with a modern aesthetic. The film’s look was characterized by its distinctive lighting and photographic techniques, particularly in contrasting the Society scenes, colorful with Afro-centric color, bolder compositions, and playful camera movement, against the more conventional, subdued lighting of the MeetBox office.

Emmett's primary goal was to visually narrate the protagonist Aren's journey, using cinematography to reflect his emotional states. This approach drew inspiration from films such as The Legend of Bagger Vance and The Green Mile, incorporating nods to these classic "Magical Negro" films. Emmett's choice of the Sony Venice camera and Tribe7 Blackwing lenses provided strong dynamic range as a starting point for color grading, while the camera's internal NDs and high ISO enabled quick creative decisions on location.

One of the most challenging aspects of the production was filming in the Los Angeles Theater, a location three floors underground without elevators. Emmett's team utilized wireless, battery-operated lights to illuminate the expansive spaces. The most difficult scene to realize was the great hall of the society, which required building scaffolding three floors underground to access an oval array of irreplaceable glass panels thirty feet overhead, illuminated by forty Astera tubes. The crew faced significant technical challenges, including wireless interference, but successfully navigated these issues.

The film was shot in raw format, with significant color grading performed in the DI by Natasha Leonnet, who designed a show LUT that referenced 1970s Kodak Ektachrome. The final look incorporated Invizigrain technology to emulate film grain and halation.

=== Production design ===
The production design was led by Laura Fox, whose previous work includes the 2021 film The Eyes of Tammy Faye and the TV series The White Lotus (2021–present). The film's design reflects the contrast between the old-world charm of the secretive Institute and the contemporary, high-tech workspace of MeetBox. To create the Institute, the team selected the Los Angeles Theater, incorporating its existing architecture and adding magical elements, such as a series of pocket doors that could open between spaces. Inspired by historical photographs of Black life by James Van Der Zee, which were used as artwork within the Institute, the space was designed to evoke depth and history.

In contrast, MeetBox was styled as a parody of modern tech office spaces, drawing on research into workplaces like Google’s Spruce Goose hangar. The office included exaggerated features such as uncomfortable furniture, motivational posters that always ended with the word "work", and a nautical theme drawn from the company head's character. The design highlighted the superficiality of such environments. Other notable locations include a barber shop in Pacoima, the first Black-owned barber shop in the San Fernando Valley, whose length allowed a set to be built behind it, creating a magical entrance to the Institute.

== Release ==
The film premiered at the 2024 Sundance Film Festival on January 19, 2024. Focus Features originally planned to release the film in theaters in the United States and Canada on March 22, 2024, but ultimately moved the release date a week earlier. The film was released in 1,146 theaters, and Variety said its million-dollar projection was "for low single digits". It made $1.3 million on its opening weekend, ranking ninth among other films. The demographic breakdown of the opening-weekend audience was 50% male, 75% aged 25 years and older, and 52% African American, 31% Caucasian, 10% Hispanic, and 4% Asian. Audiences polled by PostTrak gave the film a 70% overall positive score, with 51% saying they would definitely recommend it. By the end of its US theatrical run, it grossed $2.5 million.

Universal Pictures released the film in theaters in the United Kingdom on April 26, 2024, where it grossed $15,558 from 111 screens in one week. The film became available for premium digital sale and rental on April 2, 2024. It became available on the streaming service Peacock on May 3, 2024. It was released on DVD and Blu-ray on May 14, 2024.

== Reception ==
Film review website Metacritic surveyed 23 critics and assessed 16 reviews as mixed, 5 as positive, and 2 as negative. It gave an aggregate score of 50 out of 100, indicating "mixed or average" reviews. Website Rotten Tomatoes, which categorizes reviews as positive or negative, surveyed 74 critics and assessed 55 reviews as negative and 19 as positive, for a 26% approval rating. The average rating calculated was 4.8 out of 10. After 47 reviews, it summarized the critical consensus: "[It] has a promising premise, but is too timid to fully engage with its most provocative ideas."

The Washington Post's Michael O'Sullivan critiqued the film as a satire with a novel concept that ultimately fell short, turning a potentially sharp commentary on racial tropes into a mix of superhero and romantic comedy elements that lacked depth and failed to challenge audiences. He said that despite its creative premise, its execution was overly cautious and pandering, and that it missed the opportunity to make a more impactful statement on race and representation in cinema.

Entertainment Weekly's Devan Coggan expressed disappointment with the film, noting that while it introduced a compelling concept that challenged a long-standing cinematic stereotype, it ultimately struggled to maintain momentum, getting lost in a conventional romantic comedy subplot that diluted its satirical potential. She felt that by failing to deeply explore its own themes, or to fully develop its magical society's world, it neither satisfied as a critique of racial representation nor as a romantic comedy, leaving much of its promise unfulfilled.

At the NAACP Image Awards, the film was nominated for Outstanding Original Score for Television/Motion Picture and for Outstanding Supporting Actor in a Motion Picture (David Alan Grier).

== Social commentary ==
=== Pre-release ===
When The American Society of Magical Negroes was first announced, The Root wrote that many anticipated the film to depict Black individuals performing magic and teleportation, similar to the style of Harry Potter. Variety reported that online discussions commenced with an educational phase where film enthusiasts clarified to general audiences that the film was not a Black version of Harry Potter but rather addressed a trope highlighted by Spike Lee in 2001, where Black characters are stereotypically portrayed to serve the narrative of white protagonists.

When Focus Features released the trailer, Variety reported that it "inflamed the Fox News crowd" for the line "white people are the most dangerous animal", referring to a scene in which a society member explains to a recruit, "White people feeling uncomfortable preambles a lot of bad stuff for us, which is why we fight white discomfort every day. The happier they are, the safer we are." Mashable observed that following the release of the trailer, opinions on X (formerly Twitter) diverged into three groups: "1) Those disappointed because they expected a film about Black people doing magic without the Black trauma; 2) Those let down that the film is a satirical romantic comedy employing a problematic trope; 3) Bad-faith actors trying to portray the film as anti-white racism."

Before the film's release, The Root's Stephanie Holland discouraged comparing The American Society of Magical Negroes to the 2023 film American Fiction, asserting that the comparison is unnecessary as both films offer unique approaches to addressing race. She highlighted the issue of limited space for Black narratives to present diverse perspectives on the same topic.

=== Post-release ===
Lovia Gyarkye, writing in The Hollywood Reporter Critic's Notebook, said The American Society of Magical Negroes "starts on a promising note" but ultimately "falls short of expectations". She characterized the film as part of a "recent trend of lukewarm Black satires" that remain "stuck responding to Obama-era post-racial delusions". Although the film "positions itself to skewer 'magical negroes' and lampoon liberal sentimentalism about interracial bonds", it "offers mostly benign observations that might have landed more forcefully a decade ago". Gyarkye contrasted the film with Spike Lee's Bamboozled (2000), Ivan Dixon's The Spook Who Sat by the Door (1973), and Melvin Van Peebles's Watermelon Man (1970), works she described as "adventuring dangerously", and argued that The American Society of Magical Negroes "lacks that kind of nerve", losing "its satirical teeth the harder Aren falls for Lizzie". She added that the 2023 series Swarm and Boots Riley's I'm a Virgo more effectively integrate absurdity and political critique, while the film "struggl[es] to fulfill the political possibilities of satire".

In The New York Times, arts and culture critic Maya Phillips wrote that the recent releases American Fiction, The American Society of Magical Negroes, and The Blackening have "failed to represent Blackness with all its due complexity — as sometimes messy, sometimes contradictory". She argued that these films "flatten and simplify Blackness to serve a more singular, and thus digestible, form of satirical storytelling". While noting that earlier works like Get Out (2017) and Sorry to Bother You (2018) used absurdist elements to explore the effects of whiteness and consumer culture, Phillips described The American Society of Magical Negroes as offering "a three-dimensional depiction of Blackness" only in premise, writing that its "fantastical central idea…is more show than substance". She added that "for most of a film that's supposed to mock a racist character trope, it's ironic that we don't see much of these characters beyond their acting in this trope", and observed that Aren’s biracial identity "is thrown out as a brief aside" in a story that otherwise treats race as incidental.

In a 2026 article in Ethnic and Racial Studies, sociologists Elizabeth Hordge-Freeman and Angelica Loblack draw on The American Society of Magical Negroes to develop their concept of "affective capital", which they describe as "a racialized resource", arguing that systems of power sustain racial hierarchies "by extending emotional legitimacy and ease to some while demanding silence and sacrifice from others". The film's fictional secret society, whose Black members are tasked with managing white anxieties, is cited as pointing to "a tacit system where emotions are extracted and redistributed to preserve racism". The authors quote one lead character's account of needing to be "Black... but palatable", hiding "the sadness behind your eyes every time you smile" and "the lump in your throat from everything you didn't say", and observe that Black society members "sacrifice their sense of self to keep the (racial) peace, but at the cost of pieces of themselves".
