= Immigration and Nationality Act Section 287(g) =

Section of a US law

Section 287(g) of the U.S. Immigration and Nationality Act authorizes the Department of Homeland Security (DHS) to deputize selected state and local law enforcement officers to enforce federal immigration law. Section 287(g) allows the DHS and law enforcement agencies to make agreements, which require the state and local officers to receive training and work under the supervision of U.S. Immigration and Customs Enforcement. ICE provides the officers with authorization to identify, process, and—when appropriate—detain immigration offenders they encounter during their regular, daily law-enforcement activity.

Section 287(g), codified at 8 U.S.C. § 1357(g), was added by section 133 of the Illegal Immigration Reform and Immigrant Responsibility Act of 1996.

== Statutory authority ==
=== Purpose and scope ===
Section 287(g) was established to increase the federal government's ability to enforce immigration law by leveraging the resources of state and local law-enforcement agencies. The program allows trained officers to assist in identifying, questioning, and processing noncitizens who may be removable under federal law. Originally conceived as a way to target individuals involved in serious crimes, the program has evolved across administrations and jurisdictions to support a variety of enforcement strategies. The scope of each agreement depends on what is included in the memorandum of agreement (MOA). Some agencies use a jail-based model, where trained officers screen people already in local custody. Others have used a task-force model, where officers with delegated authority work in the field. DHS has adjusted the program over time, expanding or narrowing how these authorities are used depending on federal priorities.

=== Delegation and limits ===
Delegation under 287(g) applies only to individual officers who are selected by their agency, trained by the federal government, and approved by United States Immigration and Customs Enforcement (ICE).

== Implementation ==
ICE requires participating officers to undergo a four-week training process. Of 15,338 local police and sheriff offices in the United States, only 37 participated in 287(g) as of March 2017. Local officials who have chosen not to participate or discontinued the program cite as their reasons program costs, disruptions to their relationship with local residents, bad publicity, and a desire to focus on criminal law enforcement as opposed to federal civil laws including immigration laws. Between 2006 and 2015, over 402,000 immigrants were identified for deportation through § 287(g). The three models of collaboration are jail enforcement model with questioning immigration status in jails, warrant service model, and task force model with immigration-related arrests. Florida state leaders have warned officials who refuse to cooperate they may be removed from office.

=== Task force model ===
Under the task force model, officers with 287(g) authority use their federal training in the field. These officers can question individuals about immigration status during traffic stops, investigations, or other encounters. This model allows local agencies to apply immigration enforcement authority outside the jail setting. It was used more widely in the early years of the program but became less common after DHS shifted its focus toward jail-based screening. The task force model has been controversial because it gives officers broad contact with the public and has raised concerns about targeting and inconsistent enforcement practices.

=== Jail model ===
Under the jail model, trained officers screen people who are already in local custody. These officers review booking information, interview individuals, and check immigration databases. If they identify someone who may be removable, they can begin the immigration processing and issue an immigration detainer. DHS has promoted the jail model because it focuses on individuals who are already detained for separate criminal or civil violations rather than on community policing activities. Most 287(g) agreements now operate exclusively under this jail-based structure.

== History ==
287(g) programs were originally used to deport criminals who were screened while in jail. Then, in 2006, officers under the sheriff of Charlotte, North Carolina, Jim Pendergraph, began screening the public for violations of civil immigration law. This began the "task force model" of 287(g) in addition to the original jail-based model. Pendergraph was later appointed chief of ICE's Office of State and Local Coordination, and in this position he expanded the task force model to other communities. At the close of 2012, ICE reported that it had decided to discontinue its agreements under the task force model, saying that "other enforcement programs, including Secure Communities, are a more efficient use of resources." Participation of localities in the 287(g) program reduced from a peak of 72 localities in 2011 to 37 in March 2017. Chris Newman, National Day Laborer Organizing Network's legal director, reported in early 2017 that he thought the 287(g) program was coming to a close.

Donald Trump asked the Department of Homeland Security to build more 287(g) partnerships in a January 2017 executive order. Commentators speculate that his planned expansion includes a return to the "task force" model. Subsequently, a number of sheriffs requested to join the 287(g) program in the early months of the Trump administration. 287(g) agreements increased from 135 in January 2025 to 649 in June 2025.

In June 2025, the Texas Legislature passed Senate Bill 8, which requires sheriff's offices that operate or contract for a county jail to request and enter into a 287(g) agreement with ICE by December 1, 2026; as of mid-September 2026, 202 of the 232 sheriff's offices covered by the law had an agreement. By October 2026, Texas had 527 agreements, about one-fifth of the national total, most of them signed after January 2025; federal data showed that 68% of people arrested under the program in Texas had no criminal history.

A report by the immigration advocacy group FWD.us found that the number of state and local officers deputized under the program had doubled in eight months to more than 29,000, outnumbering ICE's roughly 11,600 deportation officers.

== Legal issues ==
Legal discussions surrounding 287(g) agreements focus on the limits of delegated authority, the proper handling of detainers, and compliance with federal immigration procedures. Courts have ruled that immigration enforcement remains primarily a federal responsibility, and that local officers must stay within the powers outlined in their agreements. Several lawsuits have challenged agencies for alleged overreach, including detaining U.S. citizens or holding individuals without a valid immigration basis. Questions about liability, due process, and the Fourth Amendment appear frequently in litigation.

The program raises federalism concerns because immigration is a federal domain, but the program relies on local officers for operational support. Supporters argue that 287(g) fits within constitutional limits because the federal government directs the program and retains final authority. Critics argue that the program blurs the line between federal and local powers, especially when local agencies use immigration authority in ways that differ from federal priorities. The voluntary nature of the program and the variation among agreements contribute to ongoing debates about the proper balance between national policy and local discretion.

=== Civil rights violations ===
The US Justice Department has found that some localities participating in the 287(g) program have used their authority to commit large scale pattern or practice constitutional violations. Maricopa County, Arizona Sheriff Joe Arpaio used his authority under § 287(g) to justify sweeps during which Latinos were illegally racially profiled. Muzaffar Chishti of the Migration Policy Institute described the situation there by saying, "there were people in yellow suits running around catching Hispanics." In Alamance County, NC, sheriff's deputies established checkpoints at entrances to Latino neighborhoods where Latino drivers were ten times more likely to be stopped than non-Latino drivers. It was also found that for the same traffic violations, Latino drivers were frequently arrested, whereas non-Latino drivers merely received citations. In February 2017, the ACLU cited numerous instances of civil rights violations, patterns of racial discrimination, and patterns of improper behavior among § 287(g) participating localities, and urged ICE to discontinue the program on the grounds that these localities could not be trusted to attend to constitutional and civil rights.

== Reception ==
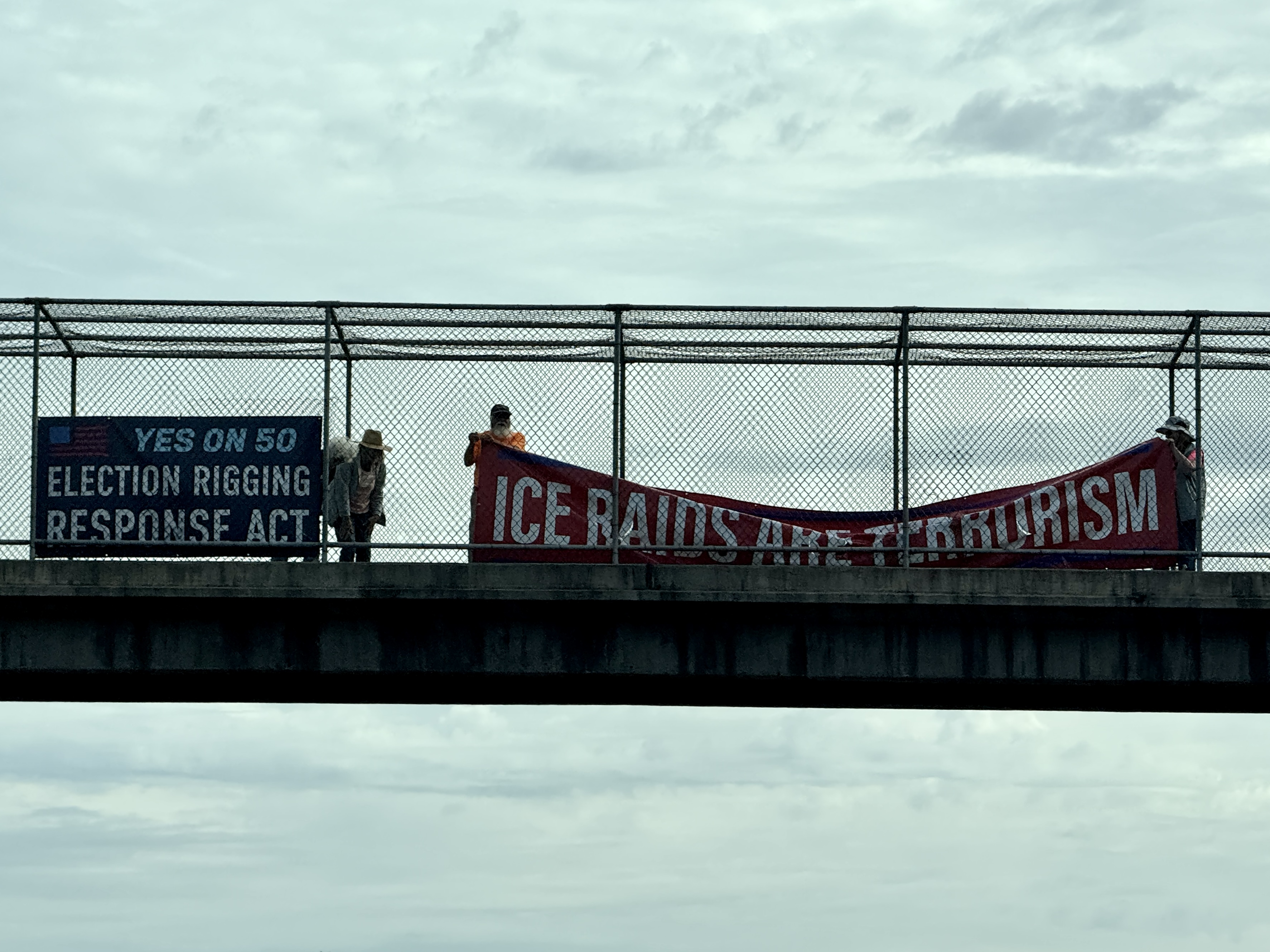
People stand on an overpass in Santa Rosa, California, holding a banner that reads “ICE Raids Are Terrorism.”

The 287(g) program has received mixed responses from policymakers, scholars, law enforcement, and community groups.

Supporters argue that the program enhances public safety by allowing local officers to assist federal authorities in identifying and processing noncitizens who may be removable under immigration law. Federal training and supervision are intended to standardize enforcement practices and reduce local errors. The jail-based model is often highlighted for focusing on individuals already in custody for criminal or civil offenses, allowing for more controlled enforcement and oversight. Proponents assert that participation can improve coordination between federal and local agencies and facilitate the removal of individuals with criminal convictions. The National Sheriffs' Association has issued a position paper supporting the expansion of the 287(g) program, stating: "It is critical that local law enforcement maintain and build upon the partnerships with federal law enforcement to ensure that collectively we can promote, protect, and preserve the public safety and homeland security."

Critics contend that the program can contribute to racial profiling and unequal treatment of immigrant communities. Investigations by civil-rights organizations and the Department of Justice have documented instances in which enforcement actions under 287(g) disproportionately affected Latino populations and occasionally resulted in the detention of U.S. citizens or lawful residents. Critics also cite concerns about community trust, noting that involvement in immigration enforcement can discourage individuals from reporting crimes or cooperating with local law enforcement. The International Association of Chiefs of Police and the Major Cities Chiefs Association have both issued statements opposing police participation in immigration enforcement on the grounds that it interferes with the "trust, communication, and cooperation" between police and the immigrant community that are necessary for police to maintain public order. (Note: See also Hoffmaster, Debra A.; Murphy, Gerard; McFadden, Shannon; Griswold, Molly (2010), Police and Immigration: How Chiefs Are Leading their Communities through the Challenges (PDF), Police Executive Research Forum; Theodore, Nik (1 May 2013), Insecure Communities: Latino Perceptions of Police Involvement in Immigration Enforcement, Chicago, IL: University of Illinois at Chicago) The Law Enforcement Immigration Task Force, composed of 63 sheriffs and police chiefs signed a letter asserting that they don't want their officers acting as immigration enforcement agents. 287(g) has also been strongly opposed by the ACLU, the American Immigration Council, and the Southern Center for Human Rights.

== See also ==
- Illegal immigration to the United States
- Immigration policy of Donald Trump
- Office of Victims of Immigration Crime Engagement
- Jessica Colotl controversy
- Sanctuary city#United States
