= Shrink (TV series) =

- Created by: Tim Baltz; Ted Tremper
- Starring: Tim Baltz; Sue Gillan; Mary Holland; Hans Holsen; Kyle More; Joel Murray; Meagen Fay
- Composer: Joshua Moshier
- Country of origin: United States
- Original language: English
- No. of seasons: 1
- No. of episodes: 8

Production
- Executive producers: Tim Baltz; Ted Tremper; Jean Doumanian; Patrick Daly; Chuck Martin; Jonathan Stern; Evan Shapiro; Kesley Balance; Dan Kerstetter
- Camera setup: Single-camera
- Running time: 30 minutes
- Production companies: Abominable Pictures; Jean Doumanian Pictures

Original release
- Network: Seeso
- Release: March 16, 2017

Shrink is an American comedy series on the Seeso comedy subscription streaming service created by Tim Baltz and Ted Tremper. The story revolves around David Tracey (Baltz), a medical student who has lost his residency and has over half a million dollars in school debt. He discovers that he can become a clinical therapist if he performs 1,920 hours of supervised therapy, and he begins seeing patients for free in his parents' garage.

== Cast ==
- Tim Baltz as David Tracey
- Sue Gillan as Sue
- Mary Holland as Rachel
- Hans Holsen as Doug
- Kyle More as Barry
- Joel Murray as Rollie
- Meagen Fay as Renetta

== Episodes ==
No.	Title	Directed by	Written by	Original release date
1	"1,920 Hours"	Graham Linehan	Tim Baltz, Chuck Martin & Ted Tremper	March 16, 2017
Recent med-school graduate David Tracey just lost his residency. With $584,000 of student loan debt and his dream of being a "real doctor" destroyed, he discovers a loophole: If he can perform 1,920 hours of supervised clinical therapy, he'll still be able to help people for a living. Now all he needs is a supervising therapist, and patients willing to come to his office...in his parents' garage.
2	"Another Stakeout 2"	Graham Linehan	Ted Tremper	March 16, 2017
After misunderstanding a therapy exercise regarding personal letters which are meant to be kept private, David compromises his relationship with two patients, and then has to enlist Doug to help him track down a letter he sent his ex.
3	"Well Sanded"	Ted Tremper	Chuck Martin	March 16, 2017
After an unfulfilling one-night stand, David grapples with the loss of his ex and the loss of potential with someone new. A first-time patient finds something unusual in his Uncle's attic. David's family starts to feel the strain of his debt.
4	"143, 144, 145..."	Chuck Martin	Chuck Martin	March 16, 2017
David uses an unorthodox approach with a new patient who's having trouble fitting in with his college basketball team. Doug's sister, Kendra, insists on becoming one of David's patients and spends her sessions setting David straight on past indiscretions.
5	"Burn Rubber"	Ted Tremper	Emily R. Wilson	March 16, 2017
The garage is being fumigated because of a rat problem, so David resorts to doing therapy in his car. After a happy hour with his former medical school friends, David has an unexpected breakup, only this time with a key patient.
6	"S.O.S."	Ted Tremper	Tim Baltz	March 16, 2017
On the brink of exhaustion from working two jobs, David falls asleep everywhere he goes. He and his mother remember David's father by going to one of his favorite places. David gets advice from an unexpected source.
7	"O.T.T."	Ryan McFaul	Emily R. Wilson	March 16, 2017
Two of David's patients break up and, despite a warning from his supervising therapist, David struggles not to intervene in their lives. Doug discovers his manager, Julia, has a different idea regarding the nature of their relationship.
8	"Cool Ranch"	Ryan McFaul	Tim Baltz, Stephen Lancellotti & Ted Tremper	March 16, 2017
Despite recent successes in therapy, a visit from an old patient forces David to question whether he's made the right career choice. Old feelings resurface when his past and present lives collide.

== Availability ==
Shrink is available to watch in the United States on the Peacock streaming services.
