= Jordan Klepper Solves Guns =

2017 American TV special

- Written by: Laura Grey
- Directed by: Todd G. Bieber
- Starring: Jordan Klepper
- Country of origin: United States
- Original language: English

Production
- Producers: Kirsten Ames; Todd G. Bieber; Steve Bodow; Jordan Klepper
- Cinematography: Joel Sadler
- Running time: 60 min. (with commercials)
- Production company: Strangehouse Studios

Original release
- Network: Comedy Central
- Release: June 11, 2017

Jordan Klepper Solves Guns is an hour-long Comedy Central special starring comedian Jordan Klepper, a correspondent on The Daily Show. It premiered on June 11, 2017. In it, Klepper plays a satirical depiction of a self-righteous liberal journalist seeking to confiscate all guns in America. Klepper, along with the special's writers, spent six months researching guns in America before they finished the special.
