= Jessica Colotl controversy =

American 2010 undocumented immigrant case

Jessica Colotl is an undocumented immigrant to the United States whose 2010 arrest for driving without a license and possible deportation called attention to the issue of illegal immigration. Colotl (born c. 1989) was brought from Mexico by her parents without valid documentation into the US when she was either 10 or 11 years old. Colotl became the center of debate over immigration policy, including the enrollment of non-citizens in state universities and discussion of Immigration and Nationality Act Section 287(g) which allowed police to turn her over to immigration enforcement.

Colotl's arrest took place during debate over immigration law as the state of Arizona had recently passed a law allowing police to ask for proof of legal residency from anyone they have reasonable suspicion against for being an illegal alien (race may explicitly not be a factor in deciding reasonable suspicion), and have already stopped for some other crime. Colotl's case received national attention. Proponents of both sides of the immigration debate rallied around the issue, which became a 'flashpoint' in the intense debate over immigration. Colotl was granted a temporary stay of deportation and was allowed to work, but that status was stripped in May 2017 when she was not allowed to renew her status under the Deferred Action for Childhood Arrivals program (DACA). She is suing the government, arguing that hers is being treated as "a test case to revoke DACA," and that the government is "exceeding its discretionary authority".

== Background ==
Colotl's parents brought her without proper documentation to the US from Puebla in southern Mexico when she was 11 years old. After graduating from Lakeside High School, she enrolled in Kennesaw State University in the fall of 2006, majored in political science, and was set to graduate in fall of 2010. Colotl was one semester away from graduating when she was arrested.

In Cobb County, where Colotl attended Kennesaw, police coordinate with Immigration and Customs Enforcement to enforce immigration law due to the Immigration and Nationality Act Section 287(g). State and local officers are allowed to act on behalf of immigration authorities because of 287(g).

== Arrest and charges ==
Colotl was pulled over by university police on March 29, 2010, for "impeding the flow of traffic," and did not have a driver's license, only an expired Mexican passport.

Colotl was arrested the day after the police pulled her over. She was transferred to a detention center in Alabama and held in custody for 35 days after her arrest because of her immigration situation. She was released on May 1, 2010. At first, Colotl was given 30 days to leave the country, but when she was released, state judge Kathryn J. Tanksley granted her a year-long deferral on her deportation, starting from when she was first arrested in March.

According to the Cobb County Sheriff's office, Colotl gave them a false address on the Sheriff's office immigration form at the time of her arrest; giving false information to police is a felony. Chris Taylor, Colotl's criminal attorney, said her car's registration had an old address, and she gave officials her current address on the form. The Sheriff's office says Colotl never lived at the address she provided.

After Colotl was released from the immigration detention center, the Cobb County Sheriff's office issued a warrant for her re-arrest on Wednesday, May 12. After the warrant for her arrest was issued, the sheriff's office launched a search for her. She turned herself in to the Cobb County Sheriff on Friday, May 14. She paid a $2,500 bond to be released later that day.

== Controversy ==
Colotl's case garnered national attention after members of the sorority Lambda Theta Alpha of which Colotl was a part marched in support of her in a march for immigration reform on May 1, 2010, wearing their Lambda Theta Alpha letters. Colotl has become a "poster child" over the 287(g) law which allows police to turn illegal immigrants over to immigration.

Georgia Latino advocacy groups had pushed the federal government for the stay in Colotl's deportation to allow her to finish college. Daniel Papp, the president of Kennesaw State University, had sent a letter to federal immigration authorities stating that Colotl was a student in good standing and asking that she be given another year in the country to finish college. This act of support for Colotl led to calls for Papp's firing. In 2007, the Board of Regents that makes policy for Georgia state universities instituted a rule that "illegal immigrants" could not receive in-state tuition. Now that she is known to be an illegal immigrant Colotl will be subject to out-of-state tuition. Colotl said she was given a permit to work legally in the US.

The American Civil Liberties Union has asked the Civil Rights Division of the United States Department of Justice to look into the case. Supporters of Colotl were agitating for passage of the DREAM Act, which would have given illegal immigrants who were brought to the US as children a path to citizenship through education; however, the Act did not pass. Colotl supporters are also calling for an end to 287(g). An InsiderAdvantage poll taken on May 17, 2010, for Atlanta's WSB-TV station showed that most Georgians who were aware of the case wanted for Colotl to be deported: 46% wanted her deported, 16% did not want her deported, and 38% were unaware of the case.

Colotl's case sparked concerns in Georgia that illegal immigrants were using up too much of the state's resources, leading to demands that the state university system take more measures to prevent illegal immigrants from enrolling in universities. Editorials appeared in media denouncing the access given to illegal immigrants to scholarships. Eric Johnson, a Georgia Republican gubernatorial candidate, after hearing about Colotl's case called for verification of citizenship to become part of the process of admission to Georgia state universities. At least two other gubernatorial candidates have also called for Georgia state universities to exclude illegal immigrants. Former Secretary of State Karen Handel, another leading Republican gubernatorial candidate, also criticized KSU officials for not verifying prospective students' legal residence, and said she would consider mandating verification of students' legal status through executive order if need be. Georgia governor Sonny Perdue discussed Colotl's case with Bob Hatcher, the chairman of the Board of Regents, and later stated that he supports allowing Colotl to stay and finish college if she pays out-of-state tuition. Republican Georgia Senator Johnny Isakson implied that he did not think Colotl should be allowed to stay and finish college because "the law is the law." State lawmakers tried unsuccessfully to pass a bill barring undocumented students from state colleges.

Colotl's case was viewed as one of the cases that influenced President Barack Obama to issue an executive order against deporting illegal immigrants who were brought into the country illegally as minors. The new policy will allow students like Colotl to stay in the US without risking deportation. Referring to that decision and Colotl's continued prosecution, her lawyer said, "with the recent executive order from the president, this issue is dead."

== Followup ==
Colotl was granted a deferment from deportation for a year so that she could stay and finish college. Days before the deferment was to expire in May 2012, it was extended for another year, and Colotl would be allowed to work during that year. Colotl graduated from college in May 2011.

For the felony charges of false swearing (lying to the police about her address), Colotl completed a pretrial diversion program, logging 150 hours of community service. Superior Court Judge Mary Staley did not dismiss her charges, finding instead that the Sheriff's office "raised legitimate concerns that have not been adequately addressed". She ruled that a 2010 misdemeanor conviction on Colotl's record for driving without a license would preclude her acceptance into the pretrial program. The district attorney and Colotl's lawyer agreed that the charges should be dismissed. In 2012 a judge ordered Colotl back to jail for her misdemeanor charge of driving without a license; she was released later the same day but still faced 11 months of probation and upwards of $1,000 in fines.

It seems the case was settled on May 25, 2018.
