= Lauren Duca =

American journalist

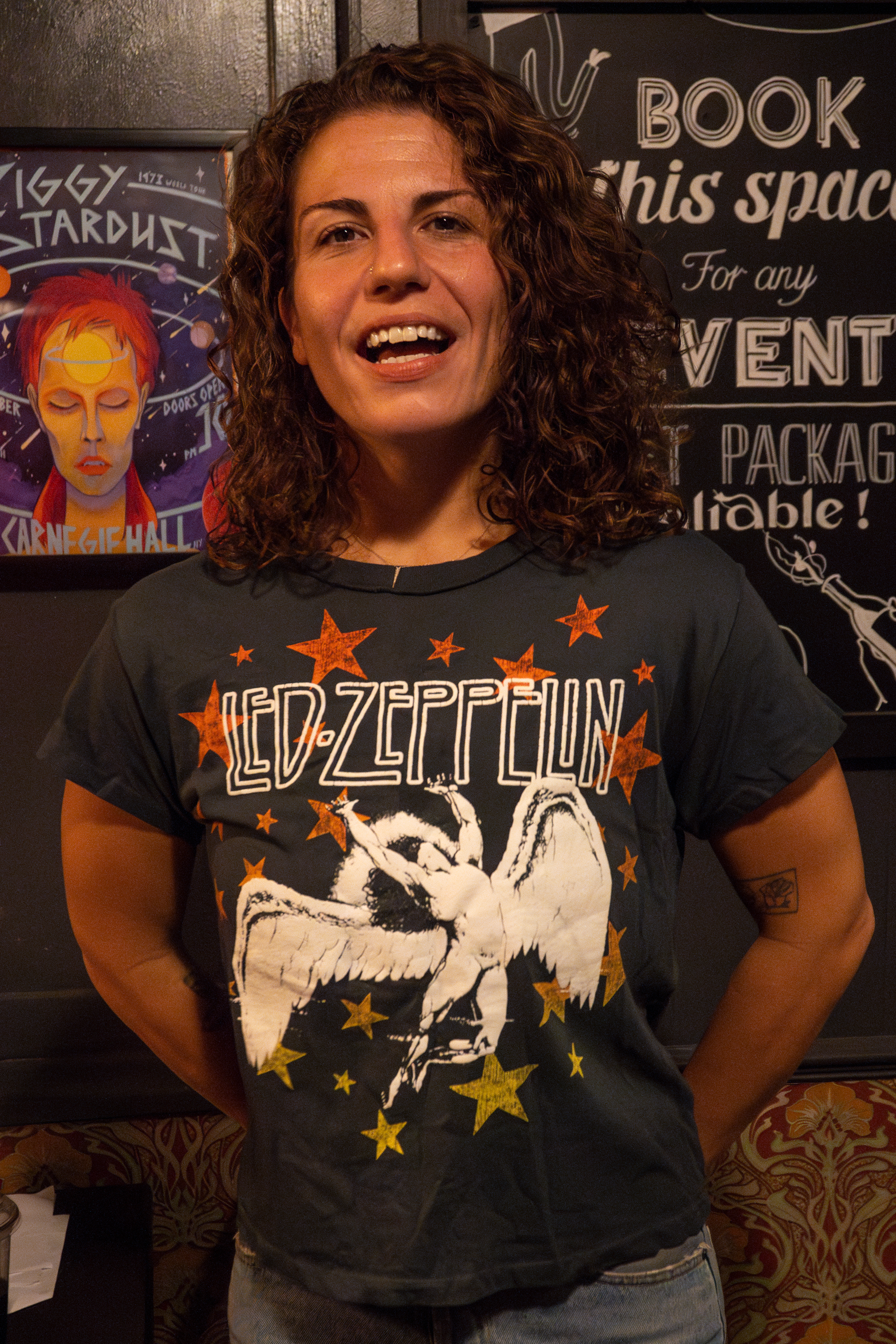
- Duca in 2024
- Born: February 24, 1991 (age 35); New York City, New York, U.S.
- Education: Fordham University; New York University
- Occupation: Journalist
- Years active: 2016–2020

Lauren Duca (born February 24, 1991) is an American former journalist and political columnist. She formerly worked at Teen Vogue, where she had a column from 2017 to 2018 called "Thigh High Politics". Her book How to Start a Revolution (2019) focuses on young people and the future of American politics.

== Early life and education ==
Duca was born in New York City and grew up in an affluent New Jersey suburb. Her parents live in New Jersey, and she has a younger brother.

In 2013, Duca graduated from Fordham University with a bachelor's degree in English and philosophy. During this time, she was editor in chief of the alternative newspaper, the paper. In 2015, Duca received her master's degree in journalism and critical theory from New York University.

== Career ==
In 2013, Duca got her start working as an online editorial intern for New York Magazine. From 2013 to 2015, Duca worked as a reporter at The Huffington Post. In 2015, she began working as a freelance reporter, often writing for Teen Vogue.

In December 2016, Duca drew attention for an op-ed in Teen Vogue titled "Donald Trump is Gaslighting America," which argued that then President-elect Donald Trump relied on deceit to undermine the truth so his critics would question their own judgment. As of December 23, 2016, the essay had been viewed 1.2 million times, becoming the magazine's most-viewed post. Katie Mettler of The Washington Post said, "[T]he Internet lit up with praise for [Duca's] 'scorched-earth' op-ed." The essay was widely cited as a turning point in the fashion magazine's reputation, with a newly recognized political dimension.

Duca appeared on Tucker Carlson Tonight on December 23, 2016, and in the heated exchange over her commentary on Ivanka Trump, Duca criticized host Tucker Carlson for not allowing her to speak and called Carlson a "partisan hack." In response, he told her that instead of political commentary, she "should stick to the thigh-high boots," referring to her earlier articles on pop star Ariana Grande. Online harassment of Duca followed, including threats of sexual assault.

In response, Duca named her new column at Teen Vogue, begun in February 2017, "Thigh-High Politics." According to the magazine, "Thigh High Politics" "[broke] down the news, provides resources for the resistance, and just generally refuses to accept toxic nonsense." She also designed a t-shirt in July 2017 with the phrase "I like my politics thigh-high," and donated all of the proceeds from each $32 shirt to Planned Parenthood in Carlson's name. As of December 2017, over $10,000 were raised.

In 2017, former pharmaceutical executive Martin Shkreli attempted to contact Duca a number of times and referenced her routinely in social media. In early January 2017, Shkreli direct-messaged Duca, tweeted her directly, edited a collage of Duca for his Twitter banner, and superimposed his face on top of an image of Duca and her then-husband to use as his profile photo. Duca posted a screenshot of a direct message from Shkreli inviting her to Donald Trump's inauguration with the caption, “I would rather eat my own organs.” After Duca tweeted about the matter to Twitter CEO Jack Dorsey, Shkreli's Twitter account was suspended for violating the website's rules prohibiting targeted harassment.

In the summer of 2019, Duca taught a six-week course at New York University's Arthur L. Carter Journalism Institute called "The Feminist Journalist." The course, focused on intersections of feminist ideology and the practice of journalism, was taught to a mixed group of high-school and college students. Four weeks after the course ended, students sent a collective formal complaint to the Institute's leadership alleging unprofessionalism in Duca's instruction, writing, "We are disappointed at the department and NYU for hiring a professor with more interest in promoting her book than teaching a group of students eager to learn." Duca disputed the complaint in her statements to a reporter for BuzzFeed News.

In September 2019, Duca released her first book, which was called How to Start a Revolution: Young People and the Future of American Politics.

== Personal life ==
Duca lives in Tucson, Arizona. Duca was married to Kris Fleming, but announced on Twitter on January 13, 2019, that she was getting divorced from her husband. Since her divorce, Duca has identified as queer, and announced her second marriage on September 5, 2020.

== Honors ==
- 2015: Los Angeles Press Club, National Arts and Entertainment Journalism Award, Online – Film/TV/Theater Feature for "The Rise of the Woman-Child"
- 2017: Citizens' Committee for Children, Vanguard Award
- 2017: Shorty Awards, Best in Journalism

== Selected works and publications ==
- Duca, Lauren (17 December 2014). "How Pop Culture Can Change The Way We Talk About Abortion". Huffington Post.
- Duca, Lauren (12 May 2015). "The Rise Of The Woman-Child". Huffington Post.
- Duca, Lauren (6 November 2015). "Wait, What Do You Know Richard Kind From?". Huffington Post.
- Duca, Lauren (28 January 2016). "Donald Trump's Path to Victory, As Told Through Headlines". The New Yorker.
- Duca, Lauren (24 June 2016). "The Depressing Truth About How Sexism Changes Us". The Nation. Archived from the original on 6 April 2018.
- Duca, Lauren (10 December 2016). "Donald Trump Is Gaslighting America". Teen Vogue.
- Duca, Lauren (10 January 2017). "I'm a Professional Woman on the Internet — Here's a Shoutout to My Trolls". Teen Vogue.
- Duca, Lauren (1 December 2017). "Sexual Abusers Must Be Held Accountable — Regardless of Political Party". Teen Vogue.
- Duca, Lauren (23 February 2018). "High Schoolers Have Always Been Political, So Start Paying Attention". Teen Vogue.
- Duca, Lauren (19 March 2018). "In New Books for Kids, Women's Victories Speak Loud and Clear". The New York Times.
- Duca, Lauren (2019). How to Start a Revolution: Young People and the Future of Politics. New York: Simon & Schuster. ISBN 978-0-349-01192-9. OCLC 1108723619.
