= Suicide of the West =

Suicide of the West may refer to:

- Suicide of the West (Burnham book), a 1964 book by James Burnham
- Suicide of the West (Goldberg book), a 2018 book by Jonah Goldberg
