= Lambda Theta Alpha =

American Latina-interest collegiate sorority

- ΛΘΑ
- Founded: December 1, 1975; 50 years ago Kean University
- Type: Social
- Affiliation: Independent
- Former affiliation: NALFO
- Status: Active
- Emphasis: Latina
- Scope: National
- Pillars: Unity, Love, and Respect
- Colors: Burgundy and Grey
- Symbol: La Concha (shell); La Luna (moon)
- Tree: La Palma (Palm Tree)
- Jewel: La Perla (pearl)
- Philanthropy: St. Jude Children's Research Hospital
- Chapters: 150 collegiate 30 alumnae
- Members: 539 active 2,148 lifetime
- Nickname: LTA, Lambda Ladies
- Headquarters: 410 East Upland Road; Ithaca, New York 14850; United States
- Website: www.lambdalady.org

Lambda Theta Alpha Latin Sorority, Inc. (ΛΘΑ) is the first and largest intercollegiate Latina-based sorority. It was established on December 1, 1975 at Kean University. It has expanded to 150 undergraduate chapters and 30 alumnae chapters. The sorority was a member of the National Association of Latino Fraternal Organizations.

== History ==
Lambda Theta Alpha Latin Sorority, Inc. was founded in December 1, 1975, at Kean College in Union Township, New Jersey, by seventeen women who sought to create a sisterhood that would provide support for Latina students in higher education. Kean College introduced bilingual studies, as well as a Latino and Caribbean Studies Department in 1975, allowing women of Latin descent whose first language was not English to attended the college. Recognizing the need for an organization that represented their cultural background and addressed the specific challenges faced by Latina students, the founders established the sorority that was "committed to empowering women, fostering leadership, and advocating for cultural awareness and social justice". It also emphasized keeping its members in college.

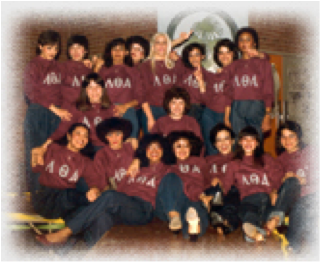
Lambda Theta Alpha Founding Mothers and Line 1

Lambda Theta Alpha was the first Latina-based sorority in the United States. It was established by seventeen women who are recognized as the Founding Mothers of the organization, including Ileana Almaguer, Cecilia Alvarez, Carmen Baez, Karen Capra, Doris Cruz, Arlene Fernandez, Eneida Figueroa, Maria Gautier, Teresa Gonzalez, Dra. Thomasa Gonzalez, Diana Ibarria, Lillian Marrero, Ofelia Oviedo, Linda Perez, Aurora "Dory" Rodriguez, Maria del Carmen Vega, and Marilyn Wyatt.

Kean College recognized the sorority in 1975 alongside fellow fraternity Lambda Theta Phi which was established at the institution that same year. The sorority initiated its first line on December 17, 1979. Over time, Lambda Theta Alpha expanded beyond Kean College, forming chapters across New Jersey.

Lambda Theta Alpha established a board of directors in 1987. It held its first national convention in 1991. In 1992, the sorority established its first chapter outside of New Jersey, becoming a national organization. It established its Alumni Association on November 18, 1995. By 2000, the sorority had expanded to fifty collegiate chapters.

The sorority joined the National Association of Latino Fraternal Organizations in January 2001, although it rescinded its membership in 2014. The National Association of Latino Fraternal Organizations recognized Lambda Theta Alpha as its Sorority of the Year for 2013–2014.

In August 2017, members of the Gamma Alpha chapter of Lambda Theta Alpha at the University of Virginia participated in counter-protest efforts during the Unite the Right rally in Charlottesville, Virginia. In response to the events that took place, the sorority issued a statement supporting racial justice and condemning racism, hate, and intolerance.

As of 2025, Lambda Theta Alpha has 539 active undergraduate members and 1,609 alumnae members, or 2,148 total initiates. Its national headquarters is in Ithaca, New York.

== Symbols ==
Lambda Theta Alpha's principals or pillars are Unity, Love, and Respect. The sorority has a call, hand sign, and salute.

The sorority's colors are burgundy and grey. Its jewel is La Perla (pearl). Its tree is La Palma (Palm Tree). Its symbols are La Concha (shell), and La Luna (moon). Its nicknames are LTA and Lovely Lambda Ladies.

== Philanthropy ==
Lambda Theta Alpha emphasizes academic excellence and community service.

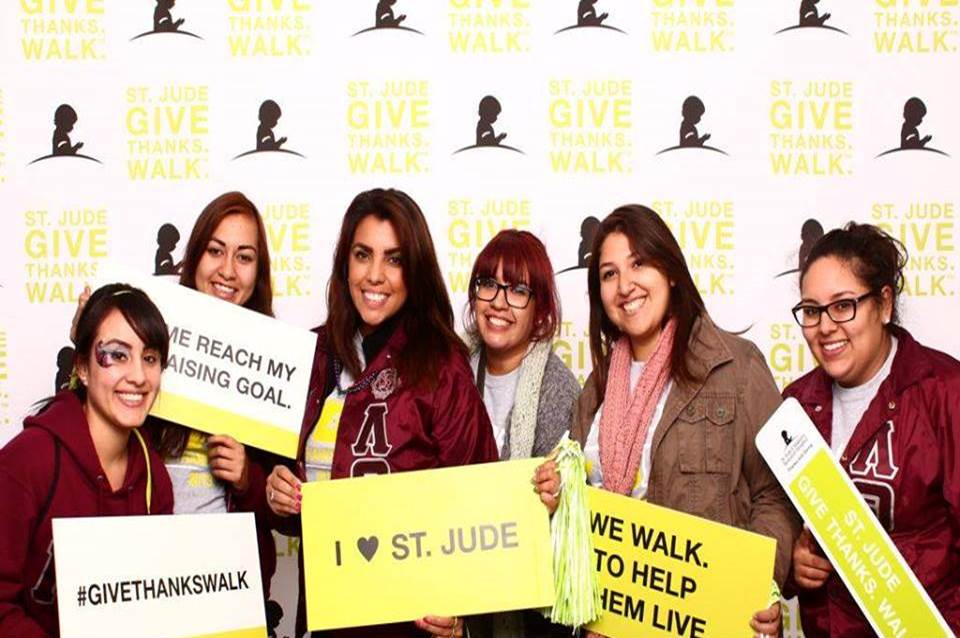
Lambda Theta Alpha sisters at the St. Jude Give Thanks Walk

=== St. Jude Children’s Research Hospital ===
Lambda Theta Alpha's national philanthropy is St. Jude Children's Research Hospital. The sorority became a collegiate partner to St. Jude Children's Research Hospital in 2010 and a partner in the St. Jude Walk/Run to End Childhood Cancer, starting in 2014.

=== Lambda Theta Alpha Foundation ===
The Lambda Theta Alpha Foundation, Inc. was founded on November 24, 2015 to provide funding for educational programming, collegiate scholarships, and humanitarian relief efforts. It was recognized as a 501(c)3 nonprofit corporation by the IRS on July 14, 2016. The foundation's signature fundraising event is the annual 1.975 Run.

=== Chapter philanthropies ===
Most chapters of the organization have a chapter philanthropy in addition to the national philanthropy. For example, the Beta Lambda chapter at Pennsylvania State University sponsors an annual Take Back the Night rally. The Beta Theta chapter at the University of Central Florida raised money to help Puerto Rico hurricane victims, held workshops on domestic violence, and mentored local high school students. The Beta Eta chapter at Texas A&M University holds workshops to help prepare local students for college and also awards a scholarship. The Gamma Delta chapter at Nova Southeastern University holds an annual Coming Out of Darkness Walk to raise funds for the American Foundation for Suicide Prevention.

== Chapters ==
As of 2025, Lambda Theta Alpha has chartered 150 undergraduate chapters and 30 alumnae chapters.

== Notable members ==
- Jessica Colotl (Kennesaw State University), undocumented immigrant to the United States whose 2010 arrest and possible deportation called attention to the issue of illegal immigration
- Naomi Defensor (Buffalo State College), cast member of The Real World: Las Vegas (2011 season)

== Controversies and member misconduct ==
=== Jessica Colotl controversy ===
Lambda Theta Alpha member Jessica Colotl had "become a flashpoint in the immigration debate" in 2010 when she was arrested in Cobb County, Georgia for driving without a license and was found to be an undocumented immigrant to the United States. Her possible deportation garnered national attention after thirty Lambda Theta Alpha members from various chapters marched in support of Coloti at an immigration rally in Atlanta, Georgia, on May 1, 2010, while wearing their Lambda Theta Alpha letters. Colotl became the embodiment of the 287(g) law which allows local police to enforce immigration laws and turn illegal immigrants over to U.S. Immigration and Customs Enforcement.

=== Protests ===
In April 2018, Lambda Theta Alpha participated in the mass boycott of the California Polytechnic State University, San Luis Obispo open house for potential students, in solidarity for minority students after a photo surfaced of a local fraternity member in blackface.

In 2019, Lambda Theta Alpha made national news for their participation in a protest march after neo-Nazi writings were found at Iowa State University.

== See also ==
- Cultural interest fraternities and sororities
- List of Latino fraternities and sororities
- List of social sororities and women's fraternities
