= Kobi Libii =

American comedian and actor

- Born: January 20, 1980 (age 46); United States
- Occupations: Actor, director, producer, writer, comedian

Kobi Libii is an American comedian, actor, writer, and director from Fort Wayne, Indiana.

Libii was a cast member on The Opposition with Jordan Klepper, a news satire television series that aired on Comedy Central. On the show, he was billed as a "citizen journalist". Other television series in which he has appeared include Doubt, Transparent, Girls, and Madam Secretary. Libii made his directorial debut in 2024 with his film The American Society of Magical Negroes. He has also performed in several plays, including the documentary play Boiling Pot, which he co-created with Evan Joiner. The play premiered at New York City's Cherry Lane Theatre in 2007. He later performed in an MCC Theater production of the Paul Downs Colaizzo play Really Really in 2013. Libii also made an appearance on Klepper as himself.

Libii graduated from Fort Wayne's Snider High School. He went on to graduate from Yale University, where he studied theater and was a member of the improv troupe Just Add Water. He studied improvisation at the Second City in Chicago, Illinois.

== Filmography ==
=== Film ===
Year	Title	Role	Notes
2021	We Broke Up	Ari	
2022	The Hater	Reggie	
2024	The American Society of Magical Negroes	—N/a	Writer, director, producer

=== Television ===
Year	Title	Role	Notes
2013	Next Caller	Kyle	
2013–2014	Alpha House	Aaron Stimson	
2014	Girls	Kobi	
2015	Forever	Keith	
2015–2017	Madam Secretary	Oliver Shaw	
2015	Jessica Jones	Zack	
2016	Younger	Rob Olive	
2016	Transparent	Cantor Duvid	
2017	Doubt	Nick Brady	
2017–2018	The Opposition with Jordan Klepper	Himself	
2019	Klepper	Himself	Also writer

=== Theater ===
Year	Title	Role
2007	Boiling Pot	Himself
2007	Ohio State Murders	David Alexander/Val
2010	Perfect Harmony	Phillip Fellows V
2012	CQ/CX	Jay Bennett
2013	Really Really	Johnson
