= Jordan Klepper =

American comedian (born 1979)

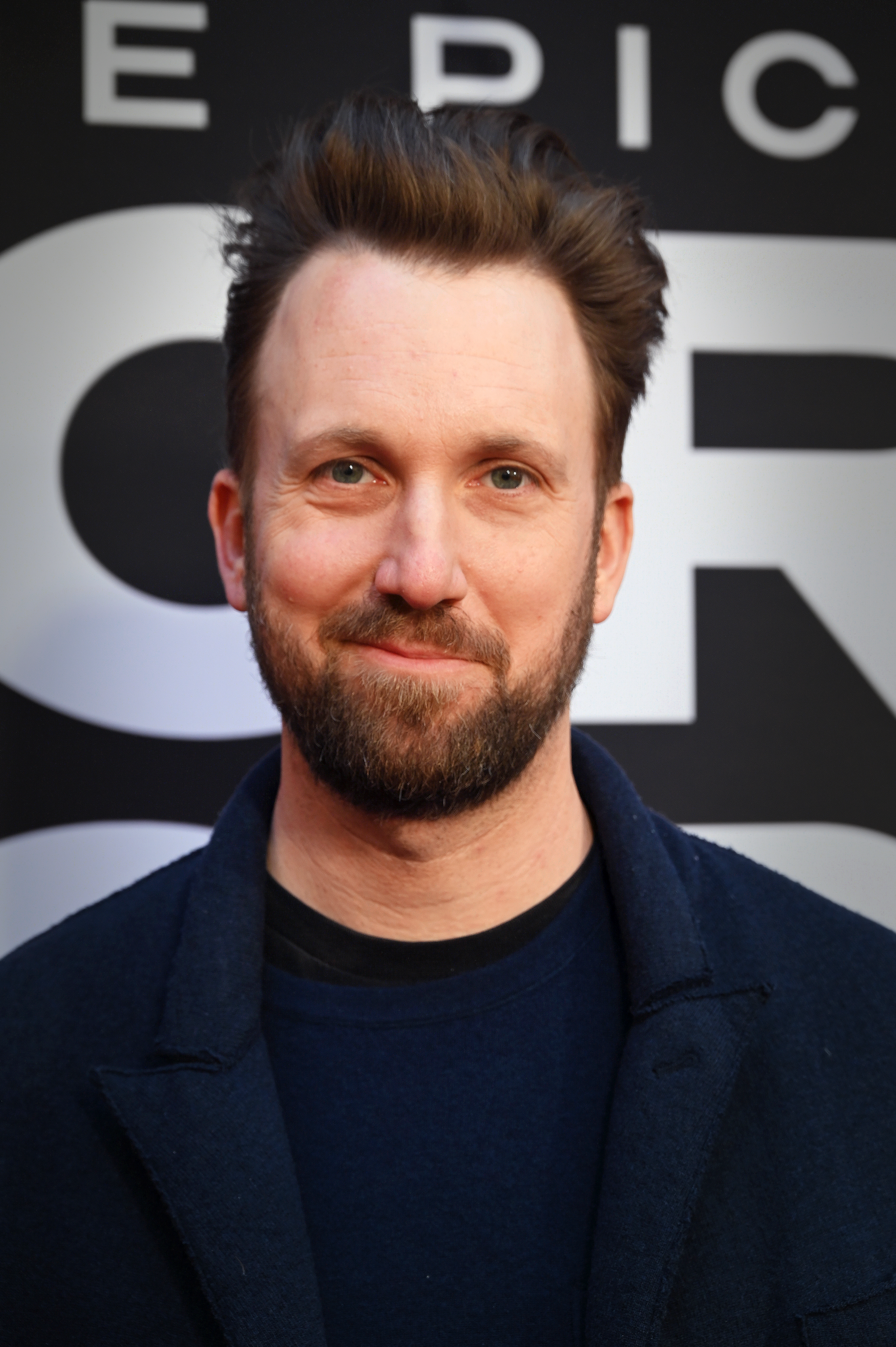
- Klepper in 2025
- Born: March 9, 1979 (age 47); Kalamazoo, Michigan, U.S.
- Education: Kalamazoo College (BA)
- Spouse: Laura Grey (m. 2013)
- Children: 1

Comedy career
- Years active: 2011–present
- Medium: Television; theatre; film; books
- Genres: Satire; improvisational comedy; blue comedy; sarcasm; sketch comedy; surreal humor
- Subjects: American politics; American culture; political punditry; popular culture; civil rights; current events; mass media
- Website: www.officialjordanklepper.com

Jordan Klepper (born March 9, 1979) is an American comedian. He began his career as a member of The Second City and Upright Citizens Brigade. From 2014 to 2017, he was a correspondent on The Daily Show. He started his own satirical program, The Opposition with Jordan Klepper, which was canceled in 2018. He then starred in the 2019 docuseries Klepper, before returning to The Daily Show later that year as a contributor, and eventually a rotating host. He often appears on a segment entitled "Jordan Klepper Fingers the Pulse."

== Early life ==
Jordan Klepper was born in Kalamazoo, Michigan, on March 9, 1979, the son of Betse, a secretary at Loy Norrix High School, and Mark Klepper. He is primarily of Dutch ancestry. Betse and Mark were introduced to each other by Betse's cousin, the actor and comedian Tim Allen, who was Mark's roommate at Western Michigan University. Klepper attended Kalamazoo Central High School and Kalamazoo Area Mathematics and Science Center, where he was a tennis player and a member of the Mock Trial Team that won Nationals.

After graduating from high school, with a Frederick W. Heyl and Elsie L. Heyl Science Scholarship Fund full-tuition scholarship from Kalamazoo College, in 1997, Klepper double-majored in math and theater and received his degree in 2001. He studied abroad in London during his time there. While at Kalamazoo College, his sister befriended aspiring actor Steven Yeun and took him to see Klepper's improv show, which inspired Yeun to attend his first acting class.

== Career ==
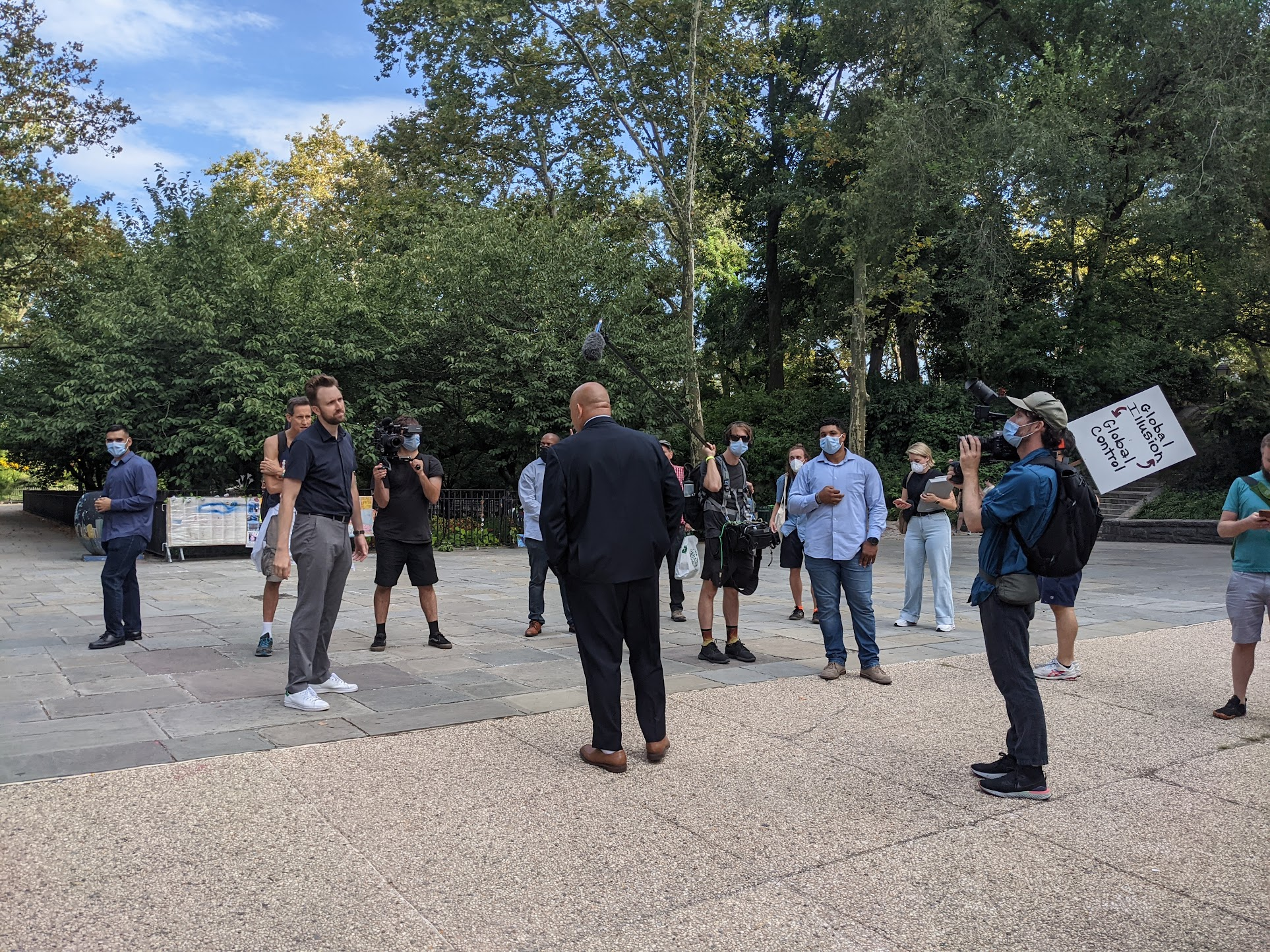
Klepper interviewing protestors against a New York COVID-19 vaccine mandate in August 2021

After graduation, Klepper moved to Chicago, where he performed at The Second City. While there, he also worked for the Big Ten Network as a comedian on the show Big Ten Friday Night Tailgate. He moved to New York City in 2011, where he began performing as a member of the Upright Citizens Brigade.

Klepper debuted on The Daily Show on March 3, 2014, four days after his initial audition. He received consistently positive reviews for his segments on the show, and filled in as the host in October 2016 when Trevor Noah was sick.

In April 2017, Comedy Central announced that Klepper would host a new show in the fall, which would follow The Daily Show. A special titled Jordan Klepper Solves Guns premiered on Comedy Central on June 11, 2017. The new show was titled The Opposition with Jordan Klepper and premiered on September 25. The show was canceled in June 2018, with Klepper starting a new docuseries, Klepper, which aired in 2019. He returned to The Daily Show in December 2019. He also launched a podcast with former Ohio governor John Kasich called Kasich & Klepper.

In October 2021, Klepper appeared in his first role as a voice actor in the Disney Channel animated series The Ghost and Molly McGee, playing Molly's father, Pete McGee.

== Influences ==
Klepper has said that his comedy influences include Trevor Noah, Stephen Colbert, and Jon Stewart.

== Personal life ==
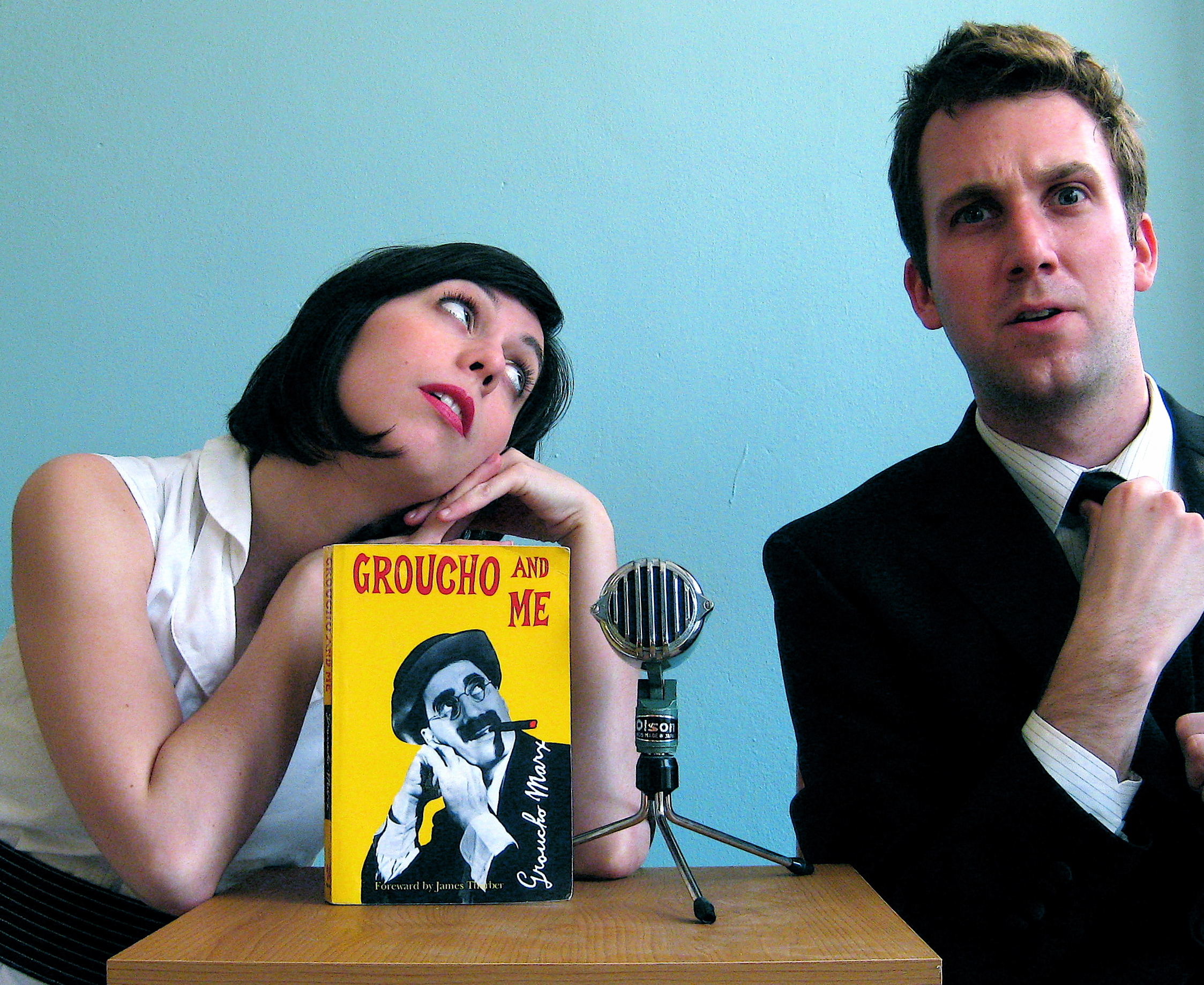
Klepper and his wife, Laura Grey, in March 2009

Klepper married Laura Grey in 2013. The two met as members of The Second City and Upright Citizens Brigade and later wrote, directed, produced, and starred in short films.

Klepper has one child.

== Filmography ==
=== Film ===
| Year | Title | Role | Notes |
|---|---|---|---|
| 2011 | Bone Dry | Jordan | Short film |
| 2011 | TMI | Kelen | Short film |
| 2012 | Poop Brunch | Jordan | Short film |
| 2012 | Engaged | Jordan | Short film |
| 2012 | Ex-Girlfriends | Student | Short film |
| 2012 | Bathroom Party | Jordan | Short film |
| 2013 | Who's On First? | Jeremy | Short film |
| 2014 | Peepers | Todd | Short film |

=== Television ===
| Year | Title | Role | Notes |
|---|---|---|---|
| 2012 | I Just Want My Pants Back | Manager | Episode: "Jerk or Dork" |
| 2014–2017; 2019–present | The Daily Show | Himself | 170 episodes |
| 2015 | Halal in the Family | Wally Thompson | Episode: "Spies Like Us" |
| 2017 | Jordan Klepper Solves Guns | Himself | TV special |
| 2017–2018 | The Opposition with Jordan Klepper | Himself | 128 episodes Host, co-creator, writer, executive producer |
| 2018 | The Who Was? Show | Bob | Episode: "Sacagawea & Blackbeard" |
| 2019 | Klepper | Himself | 8 episodes Host, creator, executive producer |
| 2021–2024 | The Ghost and Molly McGee | Pete McGee (voice) | Main role |
| 2023 | The Daily Show | Guest Host | Week of Apr. 17 |

== Awards ==
| Year | Association | Category | Work | Result |
|---|---|---|---|---|
| 2018 | GLAAD Media Award | Outstanding Talk Show Episode | The Opposition with Jordan Klepper (episode "Danica Roem") | Nominated |
| 2022 | Emmy Awards | Outstanding Writing for a Variety Special | The Daily Show: April 14, 2022 (episode No. 3666: The Daily Show with Trevor Noah Presents: Jordan Klepper Fingers the Globe – Hungary for Democracy) | Nominated |
| 2025 | Emmy Awards | Outstanding Hosted Nonfiction Series or Special | The Daily Show Presents: Jordan Klepper Fingers the Pulse: MAGA: The Next Generation | Nominated |
| 2025 | Emmy Awards | Outstanding Writing for a Nonfiction Program | The Daily Show Presents: Jordan Klepper Fingers the Pulse: MAGA: The Next Generation | Won |
| 2026 | Emmy Awards | Outstanding Hosted Nonfiction Series or Special | The Daily Show Presents: Jordan Klepper Fingers the Pulse: Give the Man a Prize | Nominated |
| 2026 | Emmy Awards | Outstanding Writing for a Nonfiction Program | The Daily Show Presents: Jordan Klepper Fingers the Pulse: Give the Man a Prize | Won |
