= Let Me Finish =

2019 book by Chris Christie

- Author: Chris Christie, Ellis Henican
- Subject: Career of Chris Christie, endorsement of Donald Trump
- Genre: Autobiography, memoir
- Publisher: Hachette Books
- Publication date: 29 January 2019
- Publication place: United States
- Media type: Print, e-book, audiobook
- Pages: 432
- ISBN: 978-0316421799 (Hardcover)
- OCLC: 1055273535

Let Me Finish: Trump, the Kushners, Bannon, New Jersey, and the Power of In-Your-Face Politics is a 2019 autobiography by Chris Christie and Ellis Henican, looking back on Christie's political career, and, in particular, his endorsement of then-presidential candidate Donald Trump.

== Reception ==
The Guardian's Lloyd Green called the book a "self-serving, fascinating and informative read". Dwight Garner of The Independent wrote, "'Let Me Finish' is a superficial and ungainly book that tries to cover so many bases at once – it's a series of attacks and justifications, it's a master class in sucking up and kicking down, it's a potted memoir, it's a stab at political rehabilitation – that reading it is like watching an octopus try to play the bagpipes."
