= Electoral history of Chris Christie =

Elections featuring Governor of New Jersey

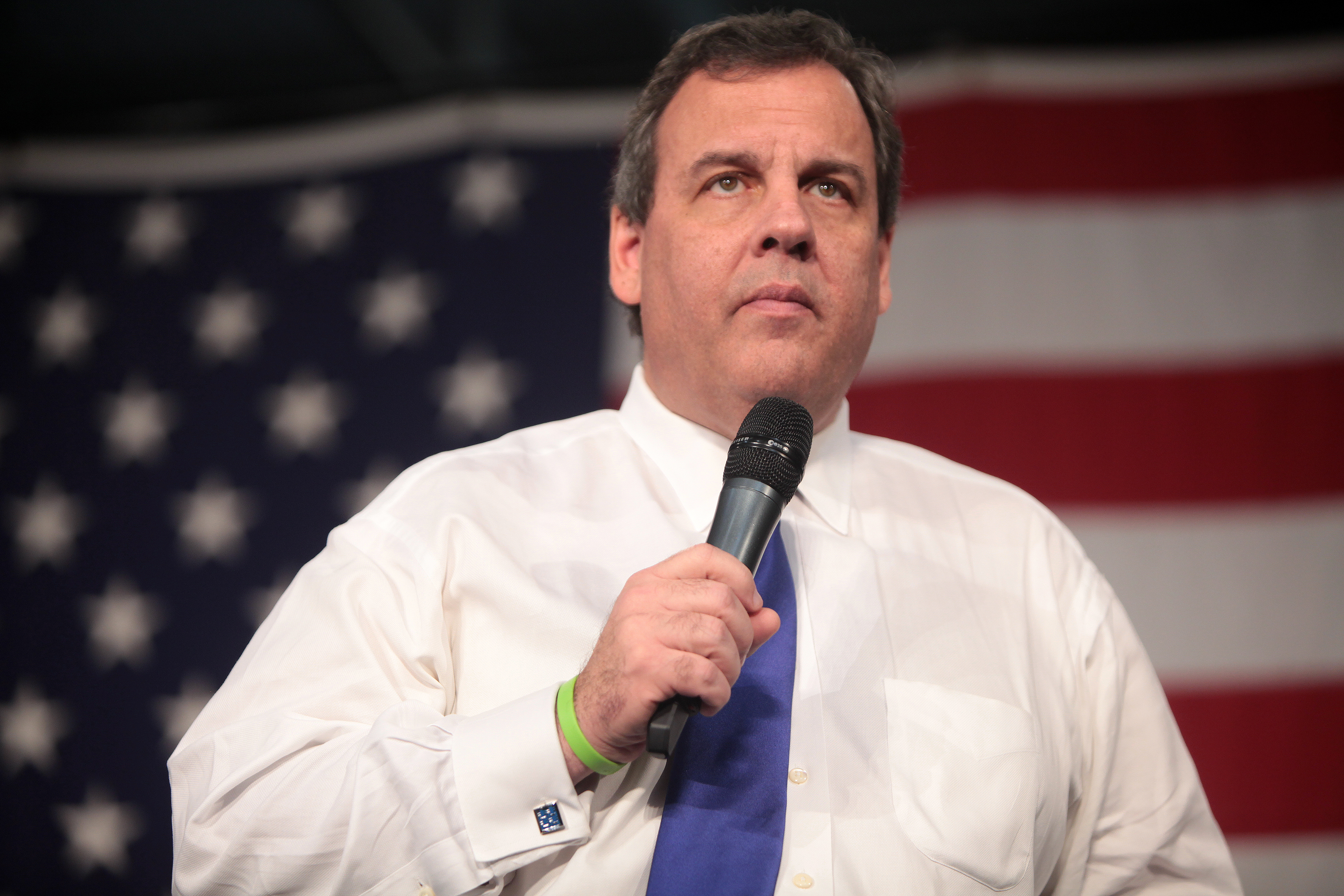
Chris Christie in 2015.

This is the electoral history of Chris Christie, the former Governor of New Jersey.

== Elections ==
=== 2024 ===
Christie received 276 write-in votes in the 2024 United States presidential election.

Republican primary results2024 Republican Party presidential primaries
Party	Candidate	Votes	%
Republican	Donald Trump	17,015,756	76.42%
Republican	Nikki Haley	4,381,799	19.68%
Republican	Ron DeSantis	353,615	1.59%
N/A	Uncommitted	154,815	0.70%
Republican	Chris Christie	139,541	0.63%
Republican	Vivek Ramaswamy	96,954	0.44%
Republican	Asa Hutchinson	22,044	0.10%
Republican	Perry Johnson	4,051	0.02%
Republican	Tim Scott	1,598	0.01%
Republican	Doug Burgum	502	0.00%
Republican	Mike Pence	404	0.00%
N/A	Other candidates	93,796	0.42%
Total votes		22,264,875	100.00%

=== 2016 ===
Christie formally launched his 2016 presidential campaign on June 30, 2015, at his high school in Livingston, New Jersey. He had already laid the groundwork for a presidential run by starting a PAC in 2015. He had already launched his campaign website on June 27. At the announcement he stated that both political parties had "failed our country", and called for more compromise in politics. "I am now ready to fight for the people," Christie said in his announcement speech. "I am proud to announce my candidacy for the Republican nomination for the presidency of the United States of America."

He spent considerable time in Iowa in 2014 laying groundwork. He had little expectation to win the Iowa caucus. He placed 10th in a field of 12 candidates with 1.8% of the ballots cast. Having claimed he would be "number one" of the state governors running, he came in 4th amongst governors.

Christie then shifted the focus of much of his campaign's effort in winning the New Hampshire Republican primary, for which a former Governor's Office staff member and political operative began working in winter 2014. Christie campaigned extensively using a town meeting format, but in polls before the primary he slipped and fell behind. He spent 70 days in the state. In the New Hampshire debate he attacked candidate Marco Rubio. He placed sixth in a field of nine in the New Hampshire primary on February 9.

Christie subsequently endorsed Donald Trump on February 26, 2016 and began campaigning for him.

Cumulative results of the 2016 Republican Party presidential primaries
Party	Candidate	Votes	%
Republican	Donald Trump	14,015,993	44.95%
Republican	Ted Cruz	7,822,100	25.08%
Republican	John Kasich	4,290,448	13.76%
Republican	Marco Rubio	3,515,576	11.27%
Republican	Ben Carson	857,039	2.75%
Republican	Jeb Bush	286,694	0.92%
Republican	Rand Paul	66,788	0.21%
Republican	Mike Huckabee	51,450	0.16%
Republican	Carly Fiorina	40,666	0.13%
Republican	Chris Christie	57,637	0.18%
Republican	Jim Gilmore	18,369	0.06%
Republican	Rick Santorum	16,627	0.05%

=== 2013 ===
Christie easily won the Republican nomination, and he went on to defeat Democrat Buono in a landslide by 22 points after consistently leading in polling. As of 2022, this is the last time a Republican won the governorship of New Jersey or won any statewide election. This is also the last time the counties of Bergen, Burlington, Camden, Middlesex, Mercer, Passaic, and Union voted for the Republican candidate in a statewide election.

Christie was criticized for spending an additional $12–25 million of state money to hold a special election for United States Senator for New Jersey three weeks earlier on October 16, instead of simply holding the special election on November 5, concurrent with the already scheduled gubernatorial election. The Democratic nominee for the U.S. Senate was Newark mayor Cory Booker. Buono said it was hypocritical, speculating that Booker's presence on the ballot would attract more black and other minority voters who would be likely to vote for Buono.

New Jersey gubernatorial election, November 5, 2013
Party	Candidate	Votes	%
Republican	Chris Christie (inc.)	1,278,932	60
Democratic	Barbara Buono	809,978	38
	all others	31,956	2
Majority		468,954	22%
Turnout		2,120,866	38
Republican hold			

Christie defeated Seth Grossman by an overwhelming margin in the Republican primary in June.

New Jersey gubernatorial Republican primary election, June 4, 2013
Party	Candidate	Votes	%
Republican	Chris Christie (incumbent)	205,666	92
Republican	Seth Grossman	18,095	8
Total votes		223,761	100

=== 2009 ===
On January 8, 2009, Christie filed papers to run for governor. He won the primary and received the party's nomination.

On July 20, 2009, Christie announced that he had chosen Kimberly Guadagno, Monmouth County sheriff, to complete his campaign ticket as a candidate for lieutenant governor. Guadagno, who was elected sheriff in 2007, had previously served on the Monmouth Beach Board of Adjustment, and also as an assistant U.S. Attorney for the District of New Jersey.

Christie faced criticism for his acceptance of $23,800 in campaign contributions (and the resulting $47,600 in public finance matching funds) from a law firm that received a federal monitor contract while Christie served as the state's U.S. Attorney. In 2006, Christie approved a deferred prosecution agreement with the University of Medicine and Dentistry of New Jersey after it admitted committing Medicare fraud. He appointed Herbert Stern, a former federal judge and prosecutor, to the $500-per-hour post of federal monitor. Christie's close friend and fundraiser John Inglesino, a partner in Stern's law firm, was paid $325 per hour for his work as counsel on the monitorship. Stern's law firm, Stern and Killcullen, received reported more than $10 million in legal fees from the contract. Stern, Inglesino, a third partner, and their wives have since each made the maximum contribution of $3,400 to Christie's gubernatorial campaign.

On November 3, Christie defeated incumbent Democratic governor Jon Corzine by a margin of 48.5% to 44.9%, with 5.8% of the vote going to independent candidate Chris Daggett.

He chose not to move his family into Drumthwacket, the official governor's mansion and remained in Mendham, New Jersey.

New Jersey gubernatorial election, November 3, 2009
Party	Candidate	Votes	%
Republican	Chris Christie	1,174,445	48
Democratic	Jon Corzine (inc.)	1,087,731	45
Independent	Chris Daggett	139,579	6
	all others	22,037	1
Majority		86,714	4%
Turnout		2,423,684	46
Republican gain from Democratic			

In the primary on June 2, Christie won the Republican nomination with 55% of the vote, defeating conservative opponents Steve Lonegan (42%) and Rick Merkt (3%), the latter of whom was Christie's former running mate.

New Jersey gubernatorial Republican primary election, June 2, 2009
Party	Candidate	Votes	%
Republican	Chris Christie	184,085	55
Republican	Steve Lonegan	140,946	42
Republican	Rick Merkt	9,184	3
Total votes		334,215	100

=== 1997 ===
Christie finished behind John J. Murphy, fellow incumbent Frank J. Druetzler, and Cecilia G. Laureys, whom Christie and John C. O'Keeffe helped upset in 1994.

Morris County Board of Chosen Freeholders Republican Primary election, June 3, 1997
Party	Candidate	Votes	%
Republican	John J. Murphy	18,887	26
Republican	Frank J. Druetzler (incumbent)	15,128	21
Republican	Cecilia G. Laureys	14,092	20
Republican	John C. O'Keeffe	12,876	18
Republican	Chris Christie	11,085	15
Total votes		72,068	100

=== 1995 ===
Christie, along with running mate Rick Merkt, challenged incumbent Anthony Bucco and Michael Carroll in the primary as a pro-choice candidate who supported a ban on assault weapons. Bucco and Carroll, the establishment candidates, defeated Christie and Merkt by a wide margin.

New Jersey General Assembly Republican Primary election, 25th Legislative District, June 6, 1995
Party	Candidate	Votes	%
Republican	Anthony Bucco (incumbent)	8,425	30
Republican	Michael Patrick Carroll	7,219	26
Republican	Rick Merkt	4,548	16
Republican	Chris Christie	4,389	16
Republican	J. Patrick Gilligan	2,074	7
Republican	Frank Zanotti	1,518	5
Total votes		28,173	100

=== 1994 ===
In 1994, Christie was elected as a Republican to the Board of Chosen Freeholders, or legislators, for Morris County, New Jersey, after he and a running mate, John C. O'Keeffe, defeated incumbent freeholders Cecilia G. Laureys and Edward A. Tamm in the Republican party primary.

Morris County Board of Chosen Freeholders General election, November 8, 1994
Party	Candidate	Votes	%
Republican	John C. O'Keeffe	78,301	23
Republican	Chris Christie	78,251	23
Republican	Frank J. Druetzler (incumbent)	76,665	22
Democratic	Daniel L. Grant	37,415	11
Democratic	Robert C. Grant	37,353	11
Democratic	Stephen D. Landfield	35,615	10
Total votes		343,600	100

Morris County Board of Chosen Freeholders Republican Primary election, June 7, 1994
Party	Candidate	Votes	%
Republican	Chris Christie	13,671	16
Republican	John C. O'Keeffe	12,501	14
Republican	Frank J. Druetzler (incumbent)	11,881	14
Republican	Edward A. Tamm (incumbent)	10,635	12
Republican	Cecilia G. Laureys (incumbent)	10,272	12
Republican	Ruth Spellman	8,823	10
Republican	David Scapicchio	8,777	10
Republican	Maria P. Fornaro	5,977	7
Republican	John D. Barat	4,138	5
Total votes		86,675	100
