= 2017 New Jersey state government shutdown =

The 2017 New Jersey state government shutdown was the second shutdown in the history of the U.S. state of New Jersey after an eight-day shutdown in July 2006. The shutdown occurred after the New Jersey Legislature and Governor Chris Christie failed to agree on a state budget by the constitutional deadline. Exercising his constitutional powers as governor, Christie ordered the shutdown as a means of pressuring the Legislature to pass a budget. The shutdown began at midnight on July 1, 2017, when Christie called for an orderly shutdown of non-essential government services.

== The shutdown ==
After the legislature failed to pass a budget by midnight July 1 when the old budget ended, the governor signed an executive order that immediately stopped numerous non-essential government functions. State functions that ceased immediately included state parks and New Jersey Motor Vehicle Commission offices. The New Jersey State Police, psychiatric hospitals, the New Jersey Lottery, casinos in Atlantic City as well as race tracks at the Meadowlands Sports Complex and Monmouth Park Racetrack, and NJ Transit were not affected by the shutdown.

The shutdown was notable for closing several of the Jersey Shore's beaches, a major tourist attraction, for much of the Independence Day weekend. Island Beach State Park and the Liberty Island ferry were closed during what would normally be one of their busiest holidays; planned fireworks at Liberty State Park were cancelled and more than 100,000 people were moved to Exchange Place in Jersey City. Gov. Christie was widely criticized after The Star Ledger published photos of him vacationing with his family at a state-owned beach house at Island Beach State Park while the 10-mile beach was closed to the public due to the shutdown.

The shutdown ended on July 3, 2017.
