= Republican Rescue =

2021 book by Chris Christie

- Author: Chris Christie
- Genre: Political commentary
- Publisher: Threshold Editions
- Publication date: November 16, 2021
- Publication place: United States
- Media type: Print, e-book, audiobook
- Pages: 301

Republican Rescue: Saving the Party from Truth Deniers, Conspiracy Theorists, and the Dangerous Policies of Joe Biden is a 2021 book by American politician Chris Christie. The book focuses on conspiracy theories in the United States, moving on beyond former President Donald Trump, President Joe Biden's policies, and rescuing the Republican Party.

In the book Christie addresses different conspiracy theories, including one Trump often touts: that the 2020 election was "stolen"; Christie stated the 2020 election was in fact not stolen. In an interview, Nicolle Wallace criticized Christie for not including a critique of Fox News in his book.

Christie was interviewed on NPR by host Don Gonyea for its release.

== Reception ==
The book was termed a "colossal flop" by Press Run, having sold 2,289 copies in the first week of its release.

Insider NJ columnist Fred Snowflack stated, "Political junkies in New Jersey will enjoy reading this book, but the key question remains. Do a majority of Republicans really want to move on from Donald Trump? As Christie puts it, look forward, not backward. As of now, that seems doubtful."
