= Chris Christie =

Governor of New Jersey from 2010 to 2018

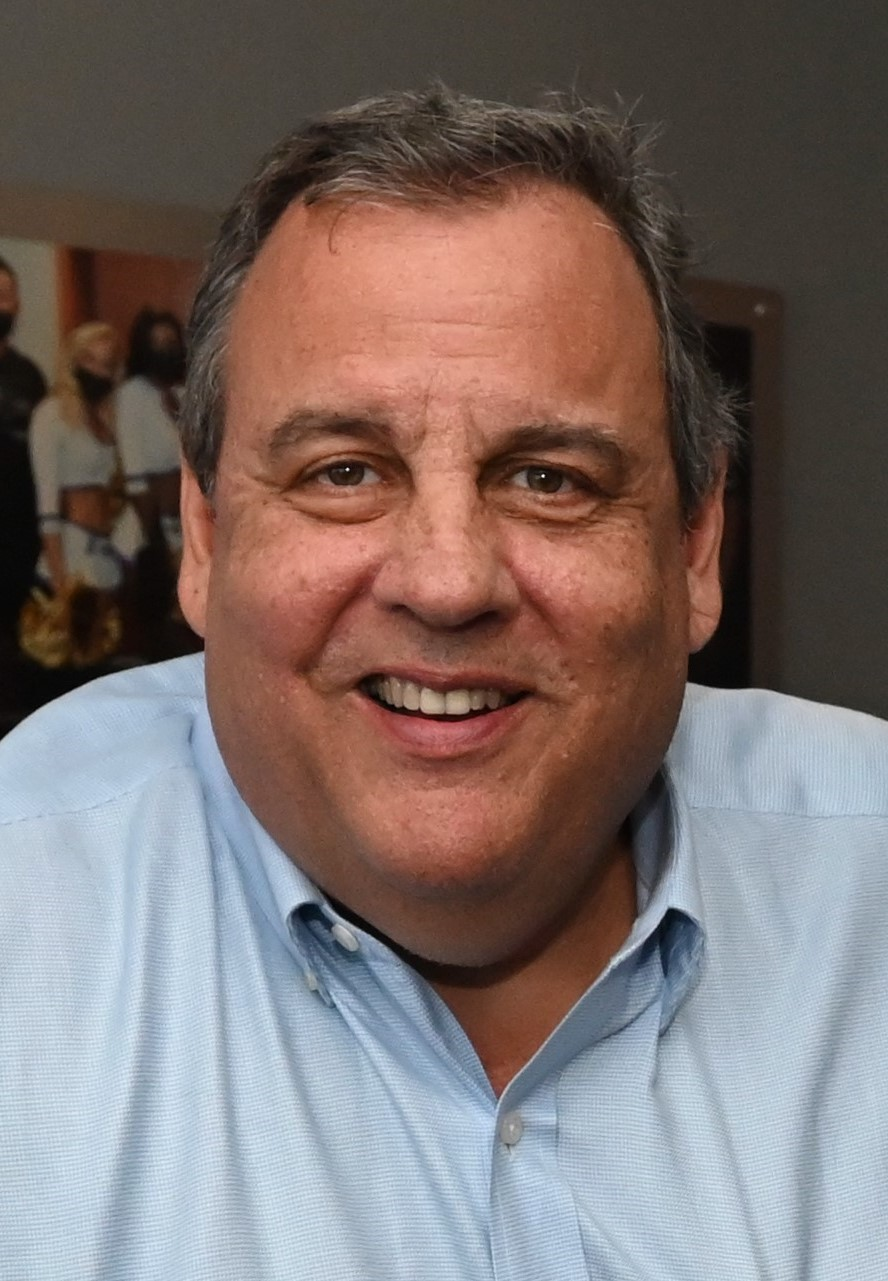
- Christie in 2022

55th Governor of New Jersey
- In office January 19, 2010 – January 16, 2018
- Lieutenant: Kim Guadagno
- Preceded by: Jon Corzine
- Succeeded by: Phil Murphy

Chair of the Opioid and Drug Abuse Commission
- In office March 29, 2017 – November 1, 2017
- President: Donald Trump
- Preceded by: Position established
- Succeeded by: Position abolished

Chair of the Republican Governors Association
- In office November 21, 2013 – November 20, 2014
- Preceded by: Bobby Jindal
- Succeeded by: Bill Haslam

United States Attorney for the District of New Jersey
- In office January 17, 2002 – December 1, 2008
- President: George W. Bush
- Preceded by: Robert J. Cleary
- Succeeded by: Ralph Marra

Member of the Morris County Board of Chosen Freeholders
- In office January 1, 1995 – December 31, 1997
- Preceded by: Edward Tamm
- Succeeded by: John J. Murphy

Personal details
- Born: Christopher James Christie; September 6, 1962 (age 64) Newark, New Jersey, U.S.
- Party: Republican
- Spouse: Mary Pat Foster (m. 1986)
- Children: 4
- Education: University of Delaware (BA); Seton Hall University (JD)

Christopher James Christie (born September 6, 1962) is an American politician and lawyer who served as the 55th governor of New Jersey from 2010 to 2018. A member of the Republican Party, he was the United States attorney for the District of New Jersey from 2002 to 2008 and a Morris County commissioner from 1995 to 1997. He was a candidate for the Republican presidential nomination in 2016 and 2024.

Born and raised in New Jersey, Christie graduated from the University of Delaware in 1984 and later earned a J.D. at Seton Hall University School of Law. He began his political career as a volunteer for Republican Thomas Kean's 1981 gubernatorial campaign. In 1994, Christie was elected as a county freeholder (legislator) for Morris County, New Jersey. His campaign that year was met with criticism as he had made several false statements about his opponent's legal issues. This criticism led to Christie losing his 1996 Republican primary reelection campaign. He later worked for the 2000 presidential campaign of George W. Bush; after Bush became president, he appointed Christie U.S. Attorney for New Jersey, a position he held from January 2002 to December 2008. During his tenure, he oversaw the convictions of 130 public officials from both local and state levels.

Christie won the 2009 Republican primary for Governor of New Jersey and defeated Democratic incumbent Jon Corzine in the general election. In his first term, he was credited with cutting spending, capping property tax growth, and engaging in recovery efforts after Hurricane Sandy. He was re-elected by a wide margin in 2013, defeating State Senate Majority Leader Barbara Buono. Christie's second term saw multiple controversies, namely the Fort Lee lane closure and his various absences from the state. He chaired the Republican Governors Association during the 2014 campaign. His term as governor expired in 2018, and he registered as a lobbyist in 2020.

On June 30, 2015, Christie announced his candidacy for the Republican nomination in the 2016 presidential election. However, he suspended his candidacy six months later following a poor showing in the New Hampshire primary. Later, he endorsed eventual winner Donald Trump and was named head of Trump's transition planning team. He remained a close ally of Trump during his first presidency. However, he later emerged as a critic following Trump's refusal to accept his loss in the 2020 United States presidential election and the subsequent January 6 Capitol attack. On June 6, 2023, Christie announced his second presidential campaign for the Republican nomination in the 2024 presidential election. His campaign was notable in its criticism of Trump compared to the other Republican candidates. He ultimately dropped out of the Republican primary before voting started.

== Early life ==
Christie as a high school senior, 1980

Christie was born on September 6, 1962, in Newark, New Jersey, to Sondra A. (née Grasso), a telephone receptionist, and Wilbur James "Bill" Christie, a certified public accountant who graduated from Rutgers Business School. His mother was of Italian (Sicilian) ancestry, and his father is of German, Scottish, and Irish descent. Christie's family moved to Livingston, New Jersey, after the 1967 Newark riots, and Christie lived there until he graduated from Livingston High School in 1980. At Livingston, Christie served as class president, played catcher for the baseball team, and was selected as a New Jersey Representative to the United States Senate Youth Program.

Christie's father and mother were Republican and Democratic, respectively. He has credited his Democratic-leaning mother for indirectly making him a Republican by encouraging him to volunteer for the gubernatorial candidate who became his role model, Tom Kean. Christie had become interested in Kean after the politician, then a state legislator, spoke to Christie's junior high school class.

Christie graduated from the University of Delaware in 1984 with a Bachelor of Arts in political science; while there, he served as president of the student body. He graduated from Seton Hall University School of Law with a J.D. in 1987. He was admitted to the New Jersey State Bar Association and the Bar of the United States District Court, District of New Jersey, in December 1987. He was awarded honorary doctorate degrees by Rutgers University and Monmouth University in 2010.

== Law practice and local politics ==
=== Lawyer ===
In 1987, Christie joined the law firm of Dughi, Hewit & Palatucci of Cranford, New Jersey. In 1993, he was named a partner in the firm. Christie specialized in securities law, appellate practice, election law, and government affairs. He is a member of the American Bar Association and the New Jersey State Bar Association and was a member of the Election Law Committee of the New Jersey State Bar Association. From 1999 to 2001, Christie was registered statehouse lobbyist for Dughi and Hewit.

=== Morris County freeholder ===
Christie volunteered for the 1992 re-election campaign of President George H. W. Bush in New Jersey and became close to Bush's state director, Bill Palatucci. Following the campaign, Christie decided to run for office and moved to Mendham Township, New Jersey. In 1993, Christie launched a primary challenge against the New Jersey Senate Majority Leader, John H. Dorsey. However, Christie's campaign ended after Dorsey successfully challenged the validity of Christie's petition to appear on the ballot.

In 1994, Christie was elected as a Republican to the Board of Chosen Freeholders, or legislators, for Morris County, New Jersey, after he and a running mate defeated incumbents in the party primary. Following the election, the defeated incumbents filed a defamation lawsuit against Christie based on statements made during the primary campaign. Christie had incorrectly stated that the incumbents were under "investigation" for violating certain local laws. The lawsuit was settled out of court, with Christie acknowledging that the prosecutor had convened an "inquiry" instead of an "investigation", and apologizing for the error, which he said was unintentional.

As a county commissioner, Christie required the county government to obtain three quotes from qualified firms for all contracts. He led a successful effort to bar county officials from accepting gifts from people and firms doing business with the county. He voted to raise the county's open space tax for land preservation; however, county taxes, on the whole, were decreased by 6.6% during his tenure. He successfully pushed for the dismissal of an architect hired to design a new jail, saying that the architect was costing taxpayers too much money. The architect then sued Christie for defamation over remarks he made about the dismissal, eventually dropping the suit without explanation.

In 1995, Christie announced a bid for a seat in the New Jersey General Assembly. He and attorney Rick Merkt ran on a ticket against incumbent Assemblyman Anthony Bucco and attorney Michael Patrick Carroll in the Republican primary. Christie ran as a pro-choice candidate and supporter of the ban on assault weapons. Bucco and Carroll, the establishment candidates, defeated the up-and-comers by a wide margin. After this loss, Christie's bid for re-nomination to the freeholder board was unlikely, as unhappy Republicans recruited John J. Murphy to run against Christie in 1997. Murphy defeated Christie in the primary. Murphy, who had falsely accused Christie of having the county pay his legal bills in the architect's lawsuit, was sued by Christie after the election. They settled out of court with the freeholders admitting wrongdoing and apologizing. Christie's career in Morris County politics was over by 1998.

=== Lobbyist ===
When Christie's part-time position as a chosen freeholder lapsed, he returned full attention to his law firm Dughi, Hewit & Palatucci. Alongside fellow partner and later, gubernatorial campaign fundraiser Bill Palatucci, Christie's firm opened an office in the state capital, Trenton, devoted mainly to lobbying. Between 1999 and 2001, Christie and Palatucci lobbied on behalf of GPU Energy for deregulation of New Jersey's electric and gas industry; the Securities Industry Association to block the inclusion of securities fraud under the state's Consumer Fraud Act; Hackensack University Medical Center for state grants; and the University of Phoenix for a New Jersey higher education license. During the 2000 United States presidential election, Christie was George W. Bush's campaign lawyer for the state of New Jersey.

== United States Attorney ==
=== Appointment ===
On December 7, 2001, President George W. Bush appointed Christie the U.S. Attorney for the District of New Jersey. During Republican presidential debates in August 2015 and November 2023, Christie falsely claimed he had been appointed by President Bush on September 10, 2001, and that the 9/11 attacks occurred in his state the next day. Some members of the New Jersey Bar professed disappointment at Christie's lack of experience. At the time, he had never practiced in a federal courtroom before, and had little experience in criminal law. Christie received the overwhelming support of the Republican Party in New Jersey. A spokesperson for Governor Donald DiFrancesco, who selected nominees for the position, said that he received hundreds of letters of support for Christie "from everyone from the Assembly speaker down to the county level, close to every member of the Legislature and every county chairman." Christie was also a top fundraiser for Bush's 2000 presidential campaign. He helped raise $350,000 for Bush, qualifying him as a "Pioneer", and also donated to DiFrancesco. Democrats seized upon the role played by Bush's political adviser, Karl Rove, after Christie's law partner, William Palatucci, a Republican political consultant and Bush supporter, boasted that he had selected a United States attorney by forwarding Christie's résumé to Rove. According to New Jersey's senior senator, Bob Torricelli, Christie promised to appoint a "professional" with federal courtroom experience as deputy if confirmed. By Senate tradition, if a state's senior Senator opposes the nomination of a U.S. Attorney, the nomination is effectively dead, but Christie's promise was enough for Torricelli to give the nomination his blessing. He was unanimously confirmed by the United States Senate on December 20, 2001, and sworn into office on January 17, 2002.

The brother of Christie's uncle (his aunt's second husband), Tino Fiumara, was an organized crime figure. According to Christie, the FBI presumably knew that when they conducted his background check. Later, Christie recused himself from the case and commented about what he had learned growing up with such a relative, "It just told me that you make bad decisions in life and you wind up paying a price."

=== Enforcement record ===
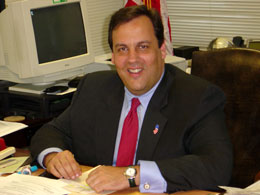
Christie, c. June 2004, served as the United States Attorney for New Jersey from 2002 to 2008.

Christie served as U.S. Attorney from January 17, 2002, to December 1, 2008. His office included 137 attorneys, with offices in Newark, Trenton, and Camden. Christie also served on the 17-member Advisory Committee of U.S. Attorneys for Attorneys General John Ashcroft and Alberto Gonzales.

Soon after taking office, Christie let it be known that his office would make public corruption a high priority, second only to terrorism. During his six-year tenure, he received praise for his record of convictions in public corruption cases. His office convicted or won guilty pleas from 130 public officials, both Republican and Democratic, at the state, county and local levels. The most notable of these convictions included those of Democratic Hudson County Executive Robert C. Janiszewski in 2002 on bribery charges, Republican Essex County Executive James W. Treffinger in 2003 on corruption charges, former Democratic New Jersey Senate President John A. Lynch Jr., in 2006 on charges of mail fraud and tax evasion, State Senator and former Newark Democratic mayor Sharpe James in 2008 on fraud charges, and Democratic State Senator Wayne R. Bryant in 2008 on charges of bribery, mail fraud, and wire fraud.

In 2005, following an investigation, Christie negotiated a plea agreement with Charles Kushner, under which he pleaded guilty to 18 counts of illegal campaign contributions, tax evasion, and witness tampering. Kushner was sentenced to two years in prison. In December 2020, President Donald Trump pardoned Kushner.

From 2005 to 2007, Christie prosecuted the executives of Cendant for mail, wire, and securities fraud. During his 2009 gubernatorial campaign, Christie was criticized for buying shares of Cendant in 2004 and selling them the following year. Christie's defense was that his stock trades were made via investment in an externally-controlled fund and that he had inherited this prosecution from his predecessor Robert J. Cleary.

Christie negotiated seven deal deferred prosecution agreements (DPAs) during his tenure, some of which were controversial. Under agreements like these, corporations avoid prosecution if they promise not just to obey the law or pay for bad acts, but also promise to change personnel, or revamp business practices, or adopt new types of corporate governance. They are typically used in lieu of prosecution when there is evidence of particularly egregious corporate misconduct. Since 2002, these types of agreements have been sharply on the rise among federal prosecutors, with 23 between 2002 and 2005, and 66 between 2006 and 2008. Outside monitors are appointed in about half of all DPAs, to make sure that the corporations comply. In one case, Christie recommended the appointment of The Ashcroft Group, a consulting firm owned by his former boss John Ashcroft, as an outside monitor of Zimmer Holdings—a contract worth as much as $52 million from Zimmer, which was an amount in line with fee structures at that time. In another instance, Christie's office deferred criminal prosecution of pharmaceutical company Bristol Myers in a deal that required the company to dedicate $5 million for a business ethics chair at Seton Hall University School of Law, Christie's alma mater.

Christie defended the appointment of Ashcroft, citing his prominence and legal acumen. And he defended the Seton Hall donation as happenstance given that there was already a business ethics endowed chair at the only other law school in the state. Still, cases like these led to new rules within the Justice Department, and sparked a congressional hearing on the subject.

Besides doubling the size of the anticorruption unit for New Jersey, Christie also prosecuted other federal crimes. For example, he obtained convictions of brothel owners who kept Mexican teenagers in slavery as prostitutes, convicted 42 gang members of the Double II Set of various crimes including more than 25 murders, and convicted British trader Hemant Lakhani of trying to sell missiles. Despite claims of entrapment, Lakhani was convicted by jury in April 2005 of attempting to provide material support to terrorists, unlawful brokering of foreign defense articles, and attempting to import merchandise into the U.S. by means of false statements, plus two counts of money laundering. He was sentenced to 47 years in prison.

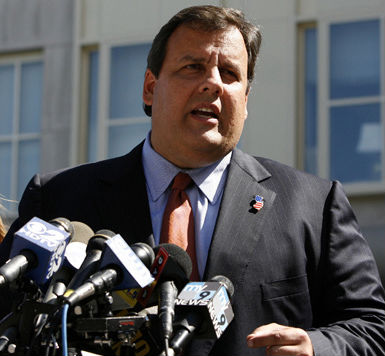
Christie speaking to reporters in Hoboken regarding the indictments against former Newark mayor Sharpe James in July 2007

In 2007, Christie prosecuted the planners of the averted 2007 Fort Dix attack plot, which he has frequently mentioned as a career highlight.

During the second term of George W. Bush, a controversy arose about the administration's dismissal of several U.S. attorneys, allegedly for political reasons. When it was revealed that Christie had been on a preliminary version of the hit list, New York Senator Charles Schumer said: "I was shocked when I saw Chris Christie's name on the list last night. It just shows a [Justice] department that has run amok." Pat Meehan, the U.S. attorney in Philadelphia, said: "Among his peers, Chris stands out as one of the most admired. If you were to create a list of the U.S. attorneys who have had the greatest impact, Chris would be one of the top two or three names I'd put on it. This defies explanation."

Christie's opponents claimed that he was dropped from the Bush administration's hit list by going after Congressman Robert Menendez; for example, The New York Times columnist Paul Krugman wrote, "Menendez's claims of persecution now seem quite plausible." Christie had issued a subpoena regarding Menendez 65 days before the 2006 Senate election, in which Menendez defeated Republican Thomas Kean Jr. to become New Jersey's junior senator. Christie's biographers (journalists Michael Symons and Bob Ingle) concluded that, "The timing of the Menendez-related subpoena doesn't line up right to support the critics' theory." Christie's aides have said that the subpoena was prompted by a newspaper report about Menendez, which prosecutors feared might imminently lead to destruction of documents and other evidence. The investigation of Menendez continued for years after Christie left office as U.S. Attorney, until Menendez was finally cleared on October 5, 2011. Menendez later resigned from office in 2024 after his conviction on federal charges for corruption, conspiracy to act as a foreign agent, accepting bribes, and obstruction of justice.

== Governor of New Jersey (2010–2018) ==
=== 2009 gubernatorial campaign ===
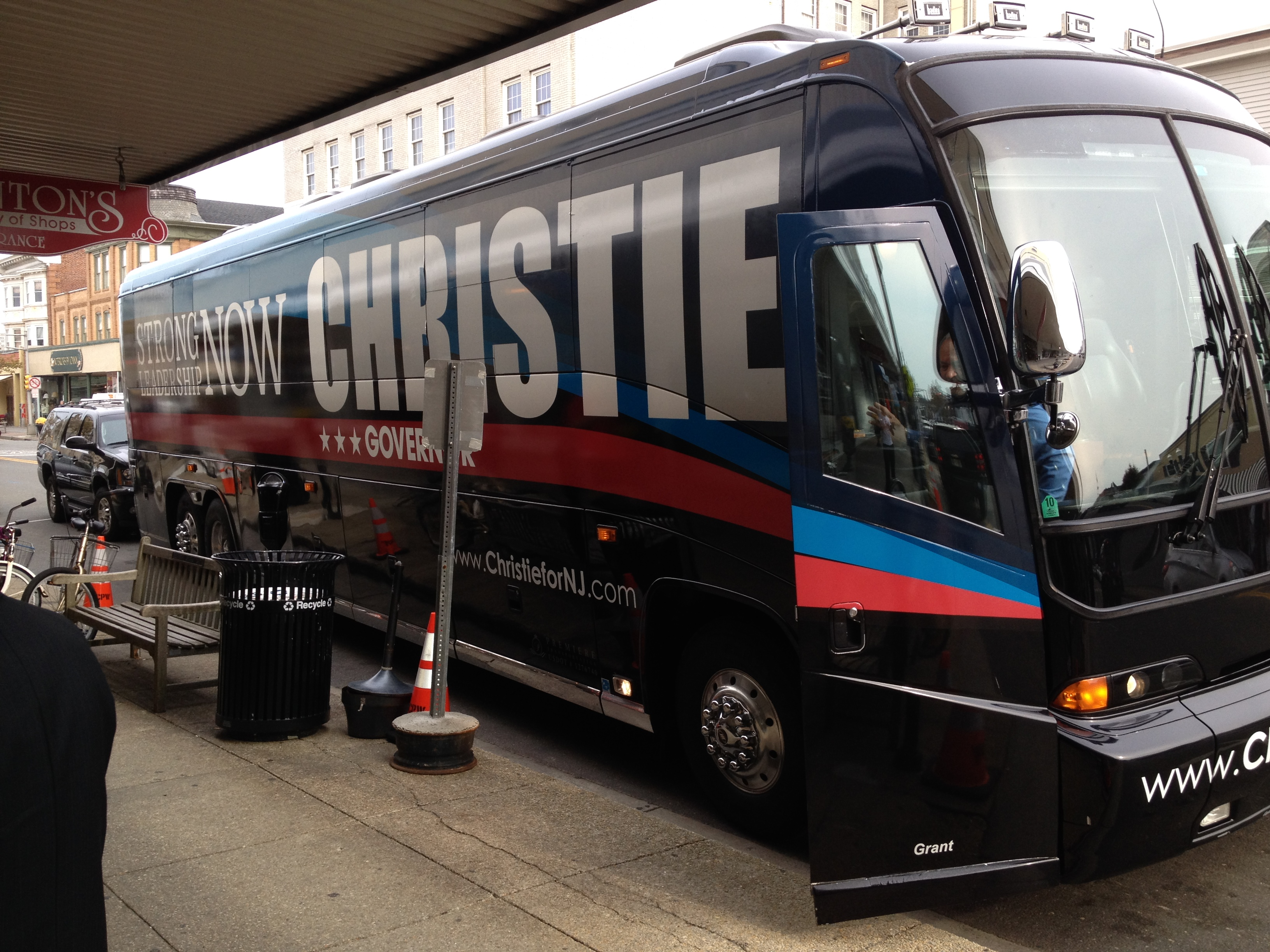
Christie's campaign bus pulls out front of Stainton Square in Ocean City, New Jersey.

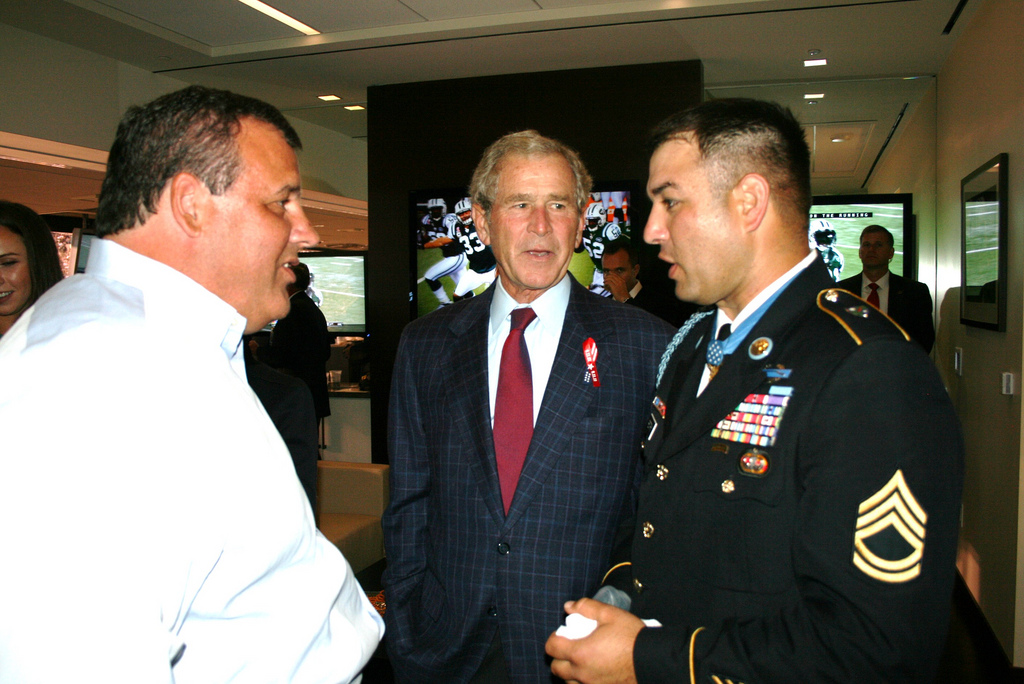
Christie with former President George W. Bush and Leroy Petry in September 2011

Christie filed as a candidate for the office of governor on January 8, 2009. Former Governor Thomas Kean helped Christie campaign and raise money. In the primary on June 2, Christie won the Republican nomination with 55% of the vote, defeating opponents Steve Lonegan and Rick Merkt. He then chose Kimberly Guadagno, Monmouth County sheriff, to complete his campaign ticket as a candidate for lieutenant governor. On November 3, Christie defeated Jon Corzine by a margin of 49% to 45%, with 6% of the vote going to independent candidate Chris Daggett.

=== 2013 gubernatorial campaign ===
In November 2012, Christie filed papers to run for a second term in office. Christie was reelected by a large margin, 60% to 38% on November 5, 2013, defeating Democratic nominee Barbara Buono. Christie advisors said that Christie sought to win by a large margin to position himself for the presidential primaries and develop a model for other Republican candidates. Christie began building a national fundraising network, aided by the fact that only one other state had a gubernatorial contest in 2013, and those financial resources were intended to support a major outreach effort toward blacks, Hispanics and women. He also ordered a $25 million special election to fill the seat of the deceased Senator Frank Lautenberg. The move was believed to be motivated by a desire to keep Newark Mayor Cory Booker from sharing an election day, 20 days afterward, with Christie, thereby depressing otherwise anticipated black voter turnout that tended to vote Democratic.

== Tenure and political positions ==
Christie took office as Governor of New Jersey on January 19, 2010. He chose not to move his family into Drumthwacket, the governor's official mansion, and instead resided in a private Mendham Township, New Jersey, residence.

=== Fiscal issues ===
While campaigning for governor, Christie promised not to raise taxes. He also vowed to lower the state income and business taxes, with the qualification that this might not occur immediately.

As governor, Christie claims his annual budgets did not increase taxes, though he made reductions to tax credits such as the earned income tax credit and property tax relief programs; he would also sign legislation limiting property tax growth to 2% annually. Under Christie, there were no rate increases in the state's top three revenue generators: income tax, sales tax, and corporate tax.

In February 2010, Christie signed an executive order declaring a "state of fiscal emergency" due to the projected $2.2 billion budget deficit for that fiscal year. Following the order, Christie proposed a new budget which eliminated the New Jersey Department of the Public Advocate, which had an upkeep of $1.3 million. In late June 2011, Christie utilized New Jersey's line-item veto to eliminate nearly $1 billion from the proposed budget, signing it into law just hours prior to July 1, 2011, the beginning of the state's fiscal year. That same year, Christie signed into law a payroll tax cut authorizing the New Jersey Department of Labor and Workforce Development to reduce payroll deduction for most employees from $148 to $61 per year.

On five separate occasions, Christie vetoed legislation pushed by Democrats to implement a millionaire tax. After Democrat Phil Murphy became governor, Democrats backed off the legislation, with New Jersey Senate President Stephen Sweeney stating, "[t]his state is taxed out. If you know anything about New Jersey, they're just weary of the taxes." The tax was eventually passed into law in 2020.

During Christie's tenure, New Jersey's credit rating was downgraded nine times (across Standard & Poor, Fitch Ratings, and Moody's Investors Service), leaving only Illinois with a lower rating among U.S. states. Christie received a B grade in 2012 and in 2014 from the Cato Institute, a libertarian think tank, in their biennial fiscal policy report on America's governors.

==== Tax credits and incentives ====
On September 18, 2013, Christie signed legislation to overhaul the state's business tax incentive programs. The legislation reduced the number of tax incentive programs from five to two, raised the caps on tax credits, and allowed smaller companies to qualify. It also increased the credits available for businesses in South Jersey.

==== Public employee pensions ====
In March 2010, Christie signed into law three state pension reform bills, which had passed with bipartisan support. The laws decreased pension benefits for future hires and required public employees to contribute 1.5 percent of their salaries toward their health care. The laws prompted a lawsuit by the police and firefighters' unions. In his campaign for governor, Christie opposed any change in pension benefits for firefighters and law enforcement officers, including "current officers, future officers or retirees". He described the pension agreement as "a sacred trust".

Later that year, he called for further cuts, including the elimination of cost-of-living adjustments for all current and future retirees. In June 2011, Christie announced a deal with the Democratic leadership of the legislature on a reform of public employee pensions and benefits. The deal raised public employees' pension contributions, mandated the state to make annual payments into the system, increased public employee contributions toward health insurance premiums, and ended collective bargaining for health benefits. The reform is projected to save the state $120 billion over 30 years.

In June 2013, Christie signed a $33 billion state budget that made a record $1.7 billion payment to the state's pension fund and also increased school funding by almost $100 million. The budget resulted from negotiations between Christie and Democratic leaders in the state legislature and was the first that Christie had signed as passed without vetoing any of its provisions.

In May 2014, Christie cut the contributions to New Jersey public workers' pension funds for a 14-month period by nearly $2.5 billion to deal with a revenue shortfall in the state budget of $2.75 billion. The state would instead make a $1.3 billion payment during the period. Christie cited the state constitution's requirement to have a balanced budget for his decision to cut payments to pensions for state workers, and followed his changes to the state's pension formula earlier in 2014 to save $900 million through the end of his term.

==== Legalization of online gambling ====
In February 2013, online gambling was legalized in New Jersey after the state's Legislature passed Bill A2578, which was later signed into law by Christie. Christie was instrumental in the legalization of online gambling in the state, citing the need for increased state revenue in the years after the 2008 recession. After vetoing previous versions of the bill, Christie signed the latest version into law after ensuring the regulatory framework was in place to safeguard players and create a responsible gambling environment. Christie was also vocal about the offshore gambling market, claiming that states lost billions in tax revenues to offshore, unregulated, and untaxed operators.

In October 2014, Christie signed a bill to legalize sports betting in New Jersey.

=== Education ===
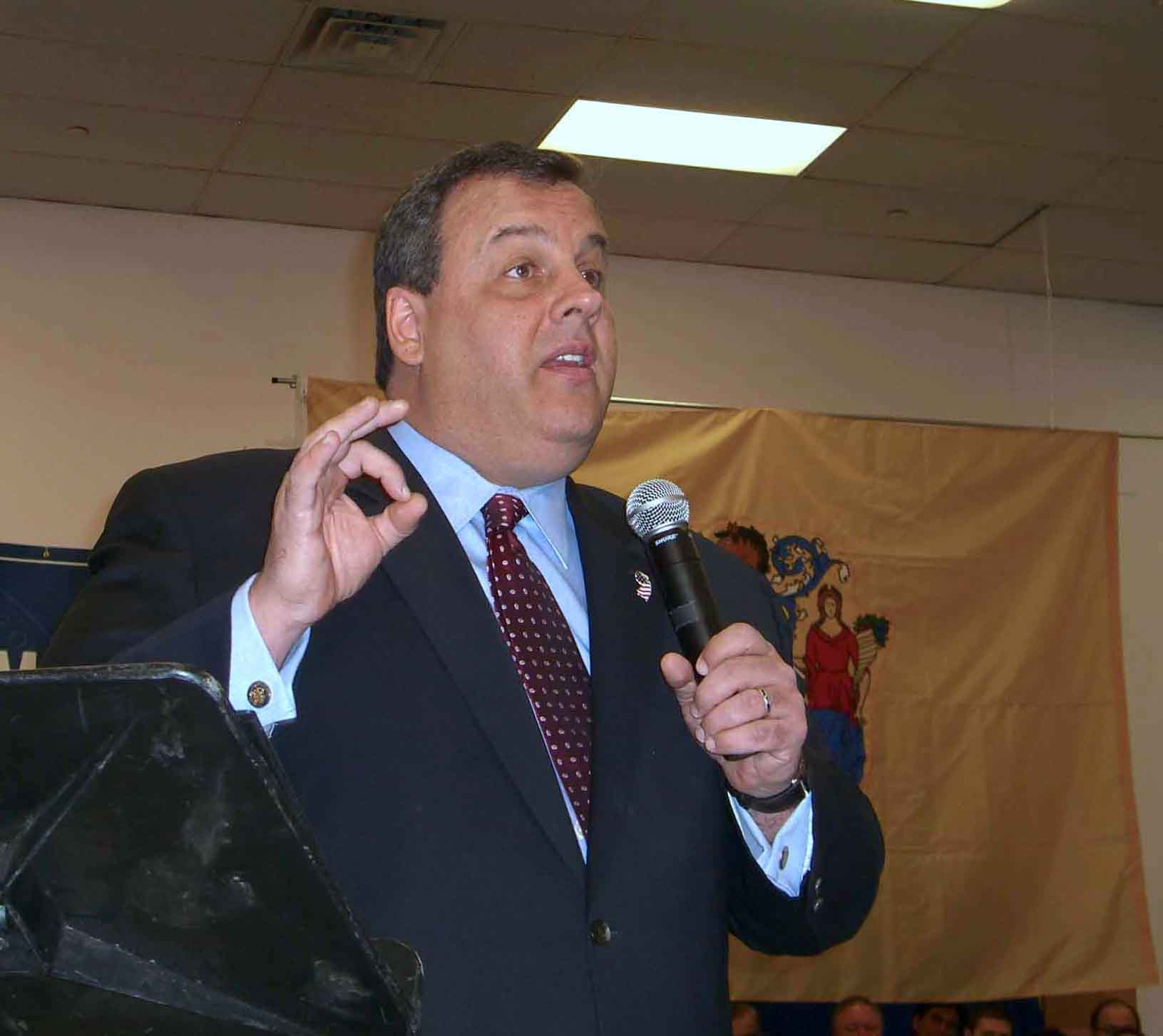
Christie at a February 2011 town hall meeting at Edison School in Union City, New Jersey

One of Christie's most controversial school policies was to increase the state's control of school districts. The districts contained relatively high numbers of underachieving students, people of color, poor people, and members of the Democratic Party. In Newark, Christie hired Chris Cerf to replace Cami Anderson as the state-appointed superintendent of its school district. Under Christie, Cerf overruled the district's locally elected school board. Recent research indicated that the reforms implemented by Christie, Anderson, and Cerf did not improve educational outcomes.

Christie has been accused of under-funding school districts. Reports indicated that Christie's administration did not adhere to the School Funding Reform Act, and illegally withheld funds from districts throughout the state. His 2017 school funding proposal was described by education researchers as "one of the least equitable in the country". State commissioner of education Chris Cerf defended policies declared unconstitutional by the Supreme Court of New Jersey.

Christie, whose children attend Catholic school, supports the state giving tax credits to parents who send their children to private and parochial schools. He also supports school vouchers, which parents of students in failing school districts could use for tuition in private schools or for public schools in communities outside their own. Christie supports merit pay for teachers.

On August 25, 2010, the U.S. Department of Health and Human Services announced that $400 million in federal Race to the Top education grants to New Jersey would not be issued due to a clerical error in the state's application by an unidentified mid-level state official. Christie said that the Obama administration had overstepped its authority, and the error was in the administration's failure to communicate with the New Jersey government. It was later learned that the issue had been raised with Bret Schundler, Christie's education commissioner. Christie asked for Schundler's resignation; Schundler initially agreed to resign, but asked to be fired the following morning to claim unemployment benefits. According to Schundler, he told Christie the truth and Christie misstated what actually occurred.

The Christie administration approved 23 new charter schools in January 2011, including New Jersey's first independent school for children with autism. The approvals increased the state's number of charter schools to 96.

On August 6, 2012, Christie signed a law reforming the tenure system for New Jersey public-school teachers. Under the law, teachers would be required to work four years (instead of three) to earn tenure; they would also need to receive positive ratings for two consecutive years. Tenured teachers with poor ratings for two consecutive years would be eligible for dismissal, with the hearing process for appeals related to dismissal of tenured teachers limited to 105 days.

On March 6, 2013, the Christie administration released proposed regulations to overhaul the process of evaluating public-school teachers. Under the proposal, a percentage of teacher evaluations would be based on student improvement in state tests or student achievement goals set by principals.

In September 2014, Christie signed a partnership with Mexico on a higher-education project to foster economic cooperation. The program would focus on research ventures, cross-border fellowships, student and teacher exchanges, conferences, and other educational opportunities.

=== Energy and environment ===
Christie has stated that he believes that the New Jersey Department of Environmental Protection is too big and is "killing business" with permit delays and indiscriminate fines. He announced that, if elected, the agency would be his first target for government reduction: he would reduce its workforce and strip it of its fish and wildlife oversight.

Christie has stated that he intends to simultaneously spur growth in the state's manufacturing sector and increase New Jersey's capability to produce alternative energy. He has proposed a list of policy measures to achieve this, including giving tax credits to businesses that build new wind energy and manufacturing facilities, changing land use rules to allow solar energy on permanently preserved farmland, installing solar farms on closed landfills, setting up a consolidated energy promotion program, and following a five-to-one production to non-production job ratio in the creation of new energy jobs. In August 2010, legislation to encourage the development of wind power in New Jersey was signed by Christie at the Port of Paulsboro. The Offshore Wind Economic Development Act authorized New Jersey Economic Development Authority to provide up to $100 million in tax credits for wind energy facilities. The governor has pledged to ban coal-fired power plants, and to reach 22.5% renewable generation in the state by 2021.

On May 26, 2011, Christie announced he would pull the state out of Regional Greenhouse Gas Initiative. This was challenged in court which ruled in March 2014 that Christie had acted illegally in doing so since state regulations do not permit it. His administration sought to repeal the rules.

==== Hydraulic fracturing ====
Christie has rejected permanent bans on hydraulic fracturing (fracking) in New Jersey and vetoed measures that would ban the process and disposal of hydraulic fracturing waste in the State. New Jersey has few proven shale reserves and the process is not practiced there. Christie argued that the vetoed Senate Bill (S253) was premature because of an ongoing study to be completed in 2014 and would discriminate against other states, a violation of the Dormant Commerce Clause of the U.S. Constitution. Supporters of legislation have said that hydraulic fracturing waste from Pennsylvania makes its way into New Jersey for treatment, although how much is not clear. They also criticized Christie's legal analysis saying that the Office of Legislative Services has said that the bill is constitutional.

==== ExxonMobil environmental contamination lawsuit ====
Christie's administration settled a lawsuit with ExxonMobil by allowing the corporation to pay $225 million in damages for environmental contamination at two sites, less than 3% of the $8.9 billion that the state's lawyers had sought, and extended the compensation to cover other damages not named in the original lawsuit. The settlement was criticized by environmental advocates. David Pringle, state campaign director of Clean Water Action, called it "the biggest corporate subsidy in state history", vowing to overturn it. Jeff Tittel of the Sierra Club said the settlement was "a violation of the public trust." The New Jersey State Senate also condemned the deal, with state senator Raymond Lesniak and others suggesting the decision was Christie's effort to plug his own budget shortfalls at the expense of taxpayers over the long term. ExxonMobil had donated $500,000 to the Republican Governors Association while Christie was chairman, though they have insisted it was unrelated to the ongoing suit. The previous gubernatorial administration, that of Democrat Jon Corzine, had also attempted to settle with Exxon, for $550 million, though this offer was made before a 2009 ruling that strengthened the state's bargaining position.

==== Farm animal welfare ====
In June 2013, Christie vetoed S1921, an animal welfare bill introduced by the Humane Society of the United States to prohibit the use of gestation crates on pregnant pigs in the state. The bill had passed in the General Assembly with a vote of 60–5 and the Senate 29–4. A 2013 survey by Mason-Dixon Polling & Research Inc. showed 91% of New Jersey voters supported the legislation. An attempt to override the veto did not come to a vote. In October 2014, a similar bill banning gestation crates, S998, was proposed with a vote in the Senate of 32–1 and in the Assembly of 53–13 (with 9 abstentions). While campaigning in Iowa in November, in a conversation with the former president of the Iowa Pork Producers Association, Christie indicated he would veto the bill. He did so on November 27, 2014. The bill's sponsor, Senator Raymond Lesniak, had vowed to override it.

=== New Jersey Supreme Court nominations ===
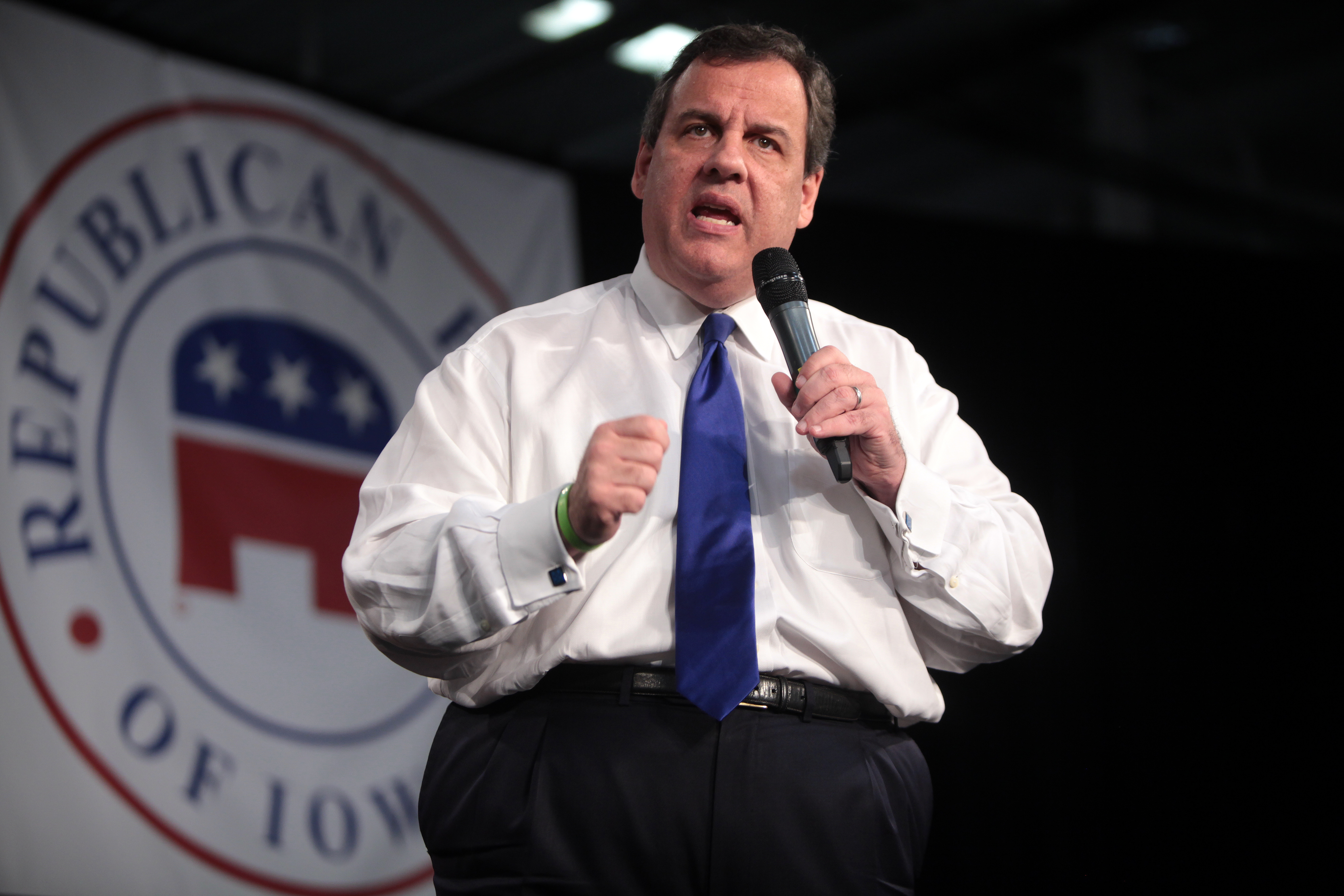
Governor Chris Christie speaking at an event in October 2015

By tradition since the 1947 state constitution, the seven-member New Jersey Supreme Court maintains a political balance and is composed of four members of either the Democratic Party or Republican Party and three of the other. Christie broke with the tradition in May 2010 when he chose not to renominate Justice John E. Wallace Jr. While on the campaign trail, Christie had said the court "inappropriately encroached on both the executive and legislative function, and that if elected governor, [he] would take steps . . . to bring back an appropriate constitutional balance to the court." Over the course of his tenure, Christie had been in a major conflict with the New Jersey Legislature over the court's partisan balance. The stand-off between the governor and the New Jersey Senate resulted in longstanding vacancies, with temporarily assigned appellate judges filling in.

=== Minimum wage and equal pay for women ===
In January 2013, Christie vetoed a New Jersey Legislature bill that would have raised the minimum wage from $7.25 to $8.50 per hour. The following November, the issue was placed on the ballot as a constitutional amendment referendum, passing with 61% of the vote.

On September 21, 2012, Christie signed Assembly Bill No. 2647 (A-2647) into law that requires employers to post and distribute notice of employees' rights to gender-equal pay, but conditionally vetoed other gender parity bills, requesting revision.

=== Immigration ===
Christie emphasizes the need to secure the border, and believes it is premature to discuss legalization of people who came to the United States unlawfully. While serving as U.S. attorney for the District of New Jersey, Christie stressed that simply "[b]eing in this country without proper documentation is not a crime," but rather a civil wrong; and that undocumented people are not criminals unless they have re-entered the country after being deported. As such, Christie stated, responsibility for dealing with improperly documented foreign nationals lies with U.S. Immigration and Customs Enforcement, not the U.S. Attorney's Office.

Christie has been critical about section 287(g) of the Immigration and Nationality Act, enacted in 1996, which can be used to grant local law enforcement officers power to perform immigration law enforcement functions.

==== In state tuition for undocumented immigrants ====
In December 2013, Christie signed legislation allowing unauthorized immigrants who attend high school for at least three years in New Jersey and graduate to be eligible for the resident rates at state college and universities and community colleges.

=== Social issues ===
==== Abortion ====
Early in his political career, Christie stated in an interview that "I would call myself … a kind of a non-thinking pro-choice person, kind of the default position". In 2009, Christie identified himself as anti-abortion, but stated that he would not use the governor's office to "force that down people's throats", while still expressing support for banning "partial-birth abortion", parental notification, and a 24-hour waiting period. He does support legal access to abortion in cases of rape, incest, or if the woman's life is in danger.

In 2014, campaigning in Alabama for incumbent governor Robert Bentley, Christie stated that he was the first "pro-life governor" elected in New Jersey since Roe v. Wade in 1973. He also stated that he had vetoed funding for Planned Parenthood five times as governor. In March 2015, Christie joined other potential 2016 Republican presidential candidates in endorsing a ban on abortions after 20 weeks of pregnancy.

Christie stated in 2023 that he believed that abortion should be a state-by-state issue, and that he would oppose a federal ban on abortion.

==== Child marriage ====
In 2017, Christie conditionally vetoed a proposed bill that would have made New Jersey the first state in the Union to completely ban child marriages, arguing that "the severe bar this bill creates is not necessary to address the concerns voiced by the bill's proponents and does not comport with the sensibilities and, in some cases, the religious customs, of the people of this state." Instead, he suggested a complete ban on marriage for everyone under the age of 16 and judicial approval for those aged 16 and 17. At that time, New Jersey permitted people aged 16 and 17 to marry with parental consent and judicial approval, assuming there was "clear and convincing evidence that granting the license would be in the best interest and welfare of the minor." After Christie left office in 2018, New Jersey became the second state in the Union to prohibit marriage for everyone under the age of majority (after Delaware), when the new governor, Phil Murphy, signed the bill into law.

==== LGBT rights ====
As governor, Christie opposed same-sex marriage but voiced support for New Jersey's civil union law, which extended to gay couples the same legal benefits of marriage with regard to state law. Christie indicated in 2009 that he would veto any bill legalizing same-sex marriage in the state, saying, "I also believe marriage should be exclusively between one man and one woman.... If a bill legalizing same sex marriage came to my desk as Governor, I would veto it." On February 17, 2012, Christie vetoed a bill that would have legalized same-sex marriage in New Jersey. The bill passed by wide but not veto-proof margins in both houses of the legislature. Christie instead proposed that the issue be presented to the voters in a statewide ballot referendum.

The issue was rendered moot shortly thereafter by a state court decision, in which the judge stated New Jersey was "... violating the mandate of Lewis v. Harris and the New Jersey Constitution's equal protection guarantee". The Christie administration responded by asking the state supreme court to grant a stay of the decision pending appeal, which was denied on October 18, 2013, in a 7–0 decision of the court which stated that it could "find no public interest in depriving a group of New Jersey residents of their constitutional right to equal protection while the appeals process unfolds". Three days later Christie withdrew the state's appeal.

Christie believes that homosexuality is innate, having said, "If someone is born that way, it's very difficult to say then that that's a sin." On August 19, 2013, Christie signed a bill outlawing gay conversion therapy for children, making New Jersey the second state to institute such a law. The law was challenged in the courts, with Christie, in his official capacity as governor, named an appellee. In September 2014, a panel of the 3rd U.S. Circuit Court of Appeals upheld the law, saying it did not violate free speech or religious rights. After announcing his candidacy for the 2024 Republican presidential primaries, Christie's campaign said that the former governor currently "respects same-sex marriage and considers it legally settled."

During his 2024 campaign, Christie stated in a CNN interview that he opposes Republican-proposed bans on gender affirming care for minors, stating, "Folks who are under the age of 18 should have parental support and guidance and love as they make all of the key decisions of their life, and this should not be one that's excluded by the government in any way." During a Fox News interview, Christie stood by his position and criticized Arkansas's ban in particular, saying, "It's more of a parent's decision than a governor's decision for goodness sakes ... You really think that [Arkansas governor] Sarah Huckabee Sanders should be making this decision for children in Arkansas?"

==== Marijuana legalization ====
Christie opposes legalizing the recreational use of marijuana, believing it to be a "gateway drug" and that tax revenue from the sale of it is "blood money". Christie said that if elected president he would "crack down" and enforce federal law in states that have legalized cannabis. In 2013, Christie signed a bill to more easily allow the use of medical cannabis by children in New Jersey. He opposed other efforts to expand the state's medical cannabis program during his governorship, however. In 2018, Christie changed his position of the federal enforcement of marijuana laws, stating that while he still personally opposes legalization, he believes the states have the right to legalize it.

==== Vaccination ====
Christie responded to calls by President Barack Obama to prevent the spread of measles by saying that parents should have a choice. The governor's office said that he "believes vaccines are an important public health protection and with a disease like measles there is no question kids should be vaccinated", but that he was unaware of a free national program to provide new parents with a vaccine checklist.

=== Gun control ===
In December 2010, Christie commuted the seven-year sentence of Brian Aitken, who had been convicted of transporting three guns within the state; as a result, Aitken was released from prison.

Christie has said that each state has the right to determine firearms laws without federal interference. When announcing his candidacy in 2009 he said he supported aggressive enforcement of the state's current gun laws. In 2013, he chose not to defend a legal challenge to a New Jersey law requiring individuals to prove an urgent threat of violence before getting permits to carry handguns. In July 2014, Christie vetoed legislation that would have reduced the allowed legal size of ammunition magazines. Instead he re-wrote it, proposing a new standard for involuntary commitment of people who are not necessarily deemed dangerous "but whose mental illness, if untreated, could deteriorate to the point of harm" as well as other forms of involuntary mental health treatments. Christie had previously vetoed proposed legislation that would bar the state pension fund from investing in companies that manufacture or sell assault firearms for civilian use and a bill to prohibit the sale of .50-caliber rifles to civilians. In July 2015, Christie vetoed a bill passed by the Assembly, 74–0 (six abstentions), and the Senate by a 38–0 (two abstentions) which would require anyone seeking to have their mental health records expunged to purchase a firearm to notify the State Police, their county prosecutor and their local police department when petitioning the court. In October 2015, the New Jersey Senate voted to override Christie's veto.

In January 2018, during his final days as Governor of New Jersey, Christie signed legislation making bump stocks illegal in the state.

=== Transportation ===
Christie has raised tolls and fares ("user fees") on the New Jersey Turnpike, Garden State Parkway, Hudson River crossings and NJ Transit buses and trains during his administration to fund projects throughout the state. In 2014, Christie authorized the increase of numerous other fees charged by the state for various licensing and administrative fees.

In 2010, Christie cancelled the Access to the Region's Core project, which would have constructed two new tunnels under the Hudson River and a new terminal station in New York City for NJ Transit commuter trains. Christopher O. Ward advocated for the tunnel on behalf of the Port Authority. Christie cited escalating costs and possible further overruns as the reason for his decision. Proponents of the project said it would have created 6,000 construction jobs per year and 45,000 secondary jobs once complete. After the cancellation, New Jersey had to return $95 million to the federal government, and used $1.8 billion of Port Authority of New York and New Jersey money from the project budget to pay for repairs to the Pulaski Skyway, since the New Jersey Transportation Trust Fund that should fund such maintenance was effectively bankrupt. The termination of the project made the need for increased rail capacity under the Hudson River more urgent, and shortly thereafter, in 2011, Amtrak's Gateway Project was unveiled, which began construction in 2023.

==== Fort Lee lane closure ====
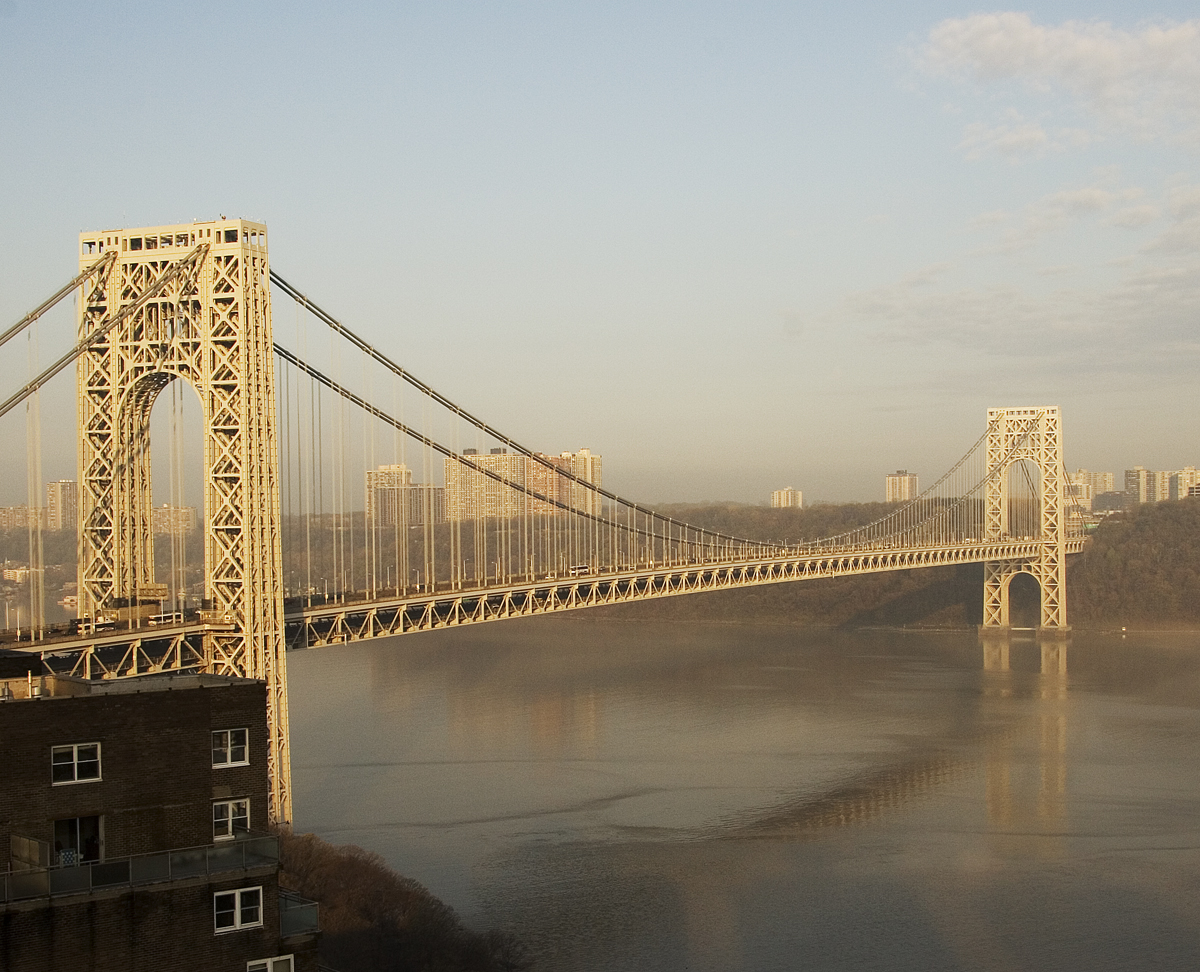
George Washington Bridge over the Hudson River, looking west from Manhattan to Fort Lee and the Palisades

From September 9 through September 13, 2013, two of the three traffic lanes in Fort Lee normally open to access the George Washington Bridge and New York City were closed on orders from a senior Christie aide and a Christie administration appointee. The lane closures in the morning rush hour resulted in massive traffic back-ups on the local streets for five days.

One common theory as to why the lanes were closed is that it was political retribution against Democratic Fort Lee mayor Mark Sokolich for not supporting Christie in the 2013 gubernatorial election. Another possible motive involves a major real estate development project, which was a top priority for Sokolich, that was under way at the Fort Lee bridge access point.

Several of Christie's appointees and aides resigned, and Christie fired others, as investigations into the closures intensified. In a radio interview on February 3, 2014, Christie indicated that he "unequivocally" had no knowledge of, did not approve, and did not authorize plans to close the toll lanes, and stated that he first found out about the traffic jams from a story in The Wall Street Journal after the lanes had been reopened. In an interview on ABC, Christie reiterated that he was shocked by the actions of his former aides, stating that "Sometimes, people do inexplicably stupid things."

In the midst of the scandal, Christie's approval ratings declined. He maintained 50–53 percent approval for five months after the scandal, before his ratings fell into the 40s by the latter half of 2014.

Other investigations were conducted by the United States Attorney for the District of New Jersey, the New Jersey Legislature, and the Port Authority of New York and New Jersey. On September 18, 2014, WNBC reported that unnamed federal sources said the US attorney investigation had found no evidence that Christie had prior knowledge of or directed the closures. An interim report by the NJ legislative committee investigating the closures was released in December 2014. The committee had been unable to determine if Christie had advance knowledge since it was asked by the US attorney to postpone interviewing certain key witnesses. At a press conference on May 1, 2015, U.S. attorney Paul J. Fishman stated that, based upon the evidence that was available, his office would not bring any more charges in the case. However, in September 2016, federal prosecutors in a trial of two New Jersey government officials over their involvement in "Bridgegate" said that a defendant and a witness boasted about their actions to the governor at the time, confirming what Donald Trump had said in December 2015 while opposing Christie for the Republican nomination for the 2016 presidential election.

On October 13, 2016, a complaint of official misconduct that alleges that the governor knew of the closures of access lanes while they were ongoing but failed to act to reopen them was allowed to proceed. In response to the complaint filed by a local citizen, Bergen County Municipal Presiding Judge Roy McGeady said "I'm satisfied that there's probable cause to believe that an event of official misconduct was caused by Governor Christie. I'm going to issue the summons." In response, Brian Murray, Christie's press secretary, accused Judge McGeady of "violating the law, pure and simple." The Superior Court overruled the probable cause decision and sent the case back to Judge McGeady, and although the Superior Court did not toss the complaint, requested by Christie's counsel, the court ruled that Judge McGeady's decision not to allow Christie's lawyers to participate in the original hearing (argue or cross-examine) was made "erroneously". In January 2017, Bergen County prosecutors said they would not seek criminal charges against Christie in connection with the scandal.

On November 4, 2016, a federal jury convicted former top Christie aides Bill Baroni and Bridget Anne Kelly of all charges. In March 2017, Baroni was sentenced to two years in prison and Kelly to 18 months in prison. The U.S. Supreme Court overturned the convictions on May 7, 2020.

=== Response to Hurricane Sandy ===
Chris Christie On Post-Sandy Obama Meet- 'I Would Do It Again' video from MSNBC in 2017 in the aftermath of Hurricane Harvey

On December 28, 2012, the U.S. Senate approved $60.4 billion disaster relief package for Hurricane Sandy, which damaged New Jersey and other states. The House did not vote until the next session on January 3. On January 2, Christie criticized the delay as "selfishness and duplicity" and blamed house speaker John Boehner and the rest of the House Republican leadership. A bill for relief was passed in the House on January 15.

In 2014, the U.S. Department of Justice opened an inquiry into allegations that Christie made state grants of Hurricane Sandy relief funds to New Jersey cities conditional on support for other projects.

=== Official visit to the Middle East ===
Continuing the tradition of earlier New Jersey governors since the 1980s, Christie traveled to Israel in April 2012. During the visit, which included meetings with Prime Minister Benjamin Netanyahu and President Shimon Peres, Christie commented that "Jerusalem has never been better or freer than under Israeli control." Christie took a helicopter tour of the West Bank and cautioned against Israeli withdrawal from the West Bank, Jerusalem or the Golan Heights. The official title given to the trip was "Jersey to Jerusalem Trade Mission: Economic Growth, Diplomacy, Observance". The visit to Israel was Christie's first official overseas trip since taking office. From Israel, Christie continued with his family to Jordan, as guests of King Abdullah II.

=== Out of state travel ===
Christie was absent from New Jersey at various points during his governorship. Christie was criticized for a December 2010 vacation to Disney World with his family, while a major blizzard damaged parts of New Jersey. At the same time, Lieutenant Governor Kim Guadagno was vacationing in Mexico, leaving Stephen Sweeney to serve as acting governor during the crisis. In a response, Christie said the vacation was a long-held promise to his children, and that he had constantly been updated about the storm by officials.

In 2015, while campaigning for president, Christie was absent from New Jersey for 261 days. Amid the January 2016 United States blizzard, Christie stayed only briefly in New Jersey for 36 hours, before heading off to New Hampshire. When asked why he was campaigning in New Hampshire when parts of the Jersey Shore were flooded in sea water Christie said: "What do you want me to do, go down there with a mop?"

Official records showed 190 full days and 71 partial days that Christie spent out of state in 2015 costed taxpayers about $614,000, and the final quarter, when Christie spent 32 days out of state campaigning for the presidency, cost $193,890. The bills totaled cost $492,420 in 2014, $220,355 in 2013; $248,277 in 2012; $129,842 in 2011 and $64,975 in 2010, which did not include the cost of overtime for the State Police troopers in EPU, which according to state regulations is confidential. A lawsuit which claimed that Christie "inappropriately forced New Jersey taxpayers to cover the cost of the governor's security and other key expenses while pursuing the presidency" was dismissed.

=== Island Beach State Park incident ===
Christie and his family at Island Beach State Park during a state government shutdown

In July 2017 during a budget shutdown and partial closing of state government services and facilities, the governor and his family were photographed from an airplane vacationing at Island Beach State Park alone on the beach. The beach was closed to the public as a result of the shutdown, and Christie commuted to the beach from Trenton via state helicopter while his family was staying at the official governor's residence there. His spokesman said that he didn't "get any sun" because he was wearing a baseball cap at the time of the photo. When asked in an interview about people being upset that he was at the beach when they were unable to visit the beach, Christie responded, "I'm sorry they're not the governor".

=== Open records battles ===
During his administration's eight years, the governor's office spent more than $1 million fighting New Jersey Open Public Records Act (OPRA) requests. On his way out, the governor, in an official letter to the State Archives, dictated how his office's records be handled. This came to light in May 2018, as the State Archives' release of electronic records relating to business by Jared Kushner, President Trump's son-in-law, were denied by his personal lawyer; Kushner's real estate company received $33 million in state tax breaks. Open records experts challenged Christie's "disturbing" actions.

=== End of tenure ===
Christie was term limited from running for a third term in the 2017 New Jersey gubernatorial election. His lieutenant governor, Kim Guadagno, ran in the election to replace him, but lost to the Democratic Party's nominee, former ambassador Phil Murphy.

By most estimates, his approval ratings when leaving office were as low as 15 percent, a drastic decline from his peak approval rating, 77 percent, in the aftermath of Hurricane Sandy. When referring to his low poll numbers, Christie said he did not care because he was not running for office. Christie left office on January 16, 2018.

== Republican Governors Association ==
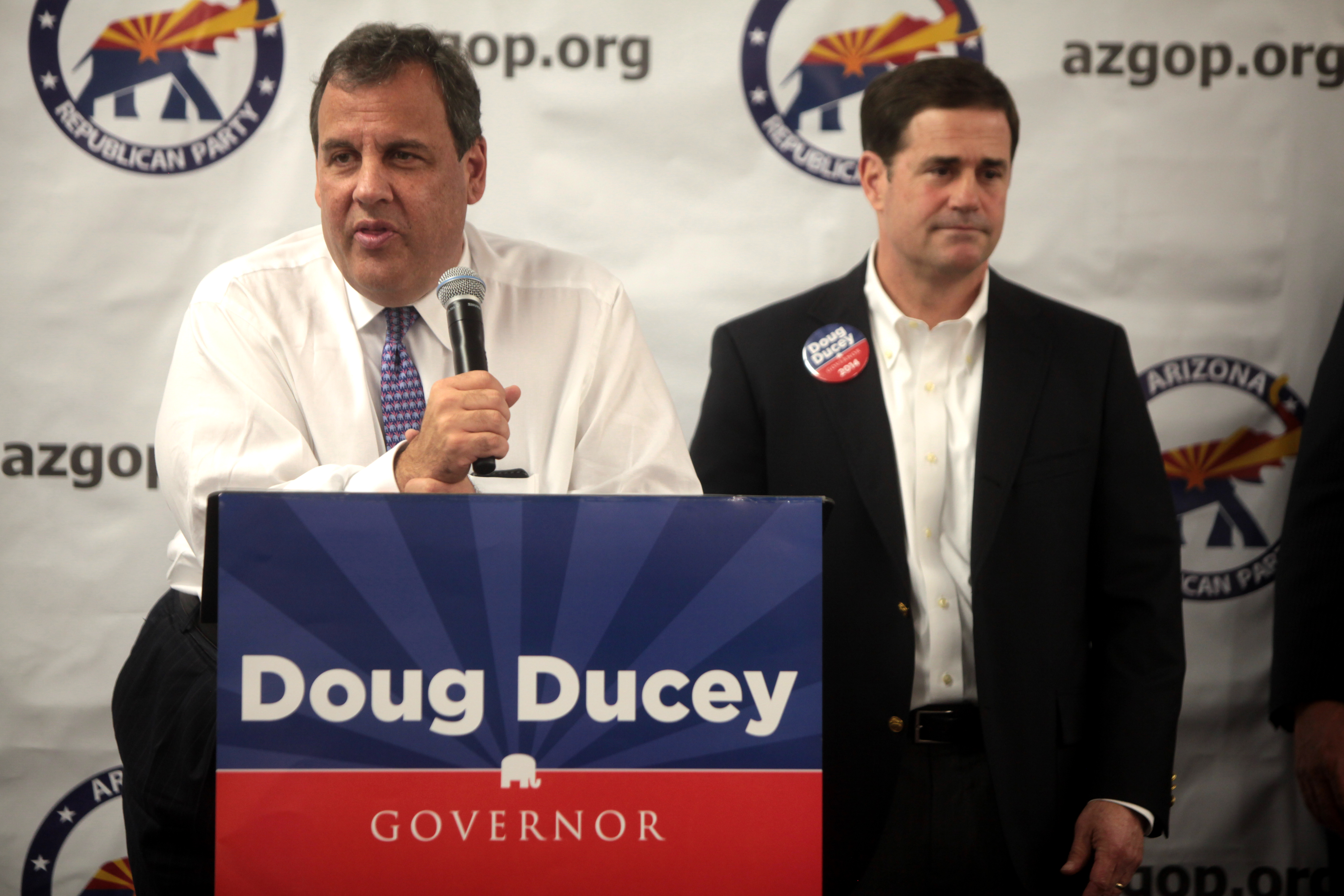
Governor Chris Christie campaigning with Arizona gubernatorial candidate Doug Ducey in 2014

In November 2013, Christie was elected chairman of the Republican Governors Association, succeeding Louisiana Governor Bobby Jindal. Christie campaigned extensively on behalf of Republican governors running for re-election. In the first three months of 2014, the RGA raised a record sum for the first quarter of a mid-term election year, and almost doubled the amount raised by the Democratic Governors Association during the same period.

Christie presided over net gains in Republican governorships in the 2014 elections, including for Republican gubernatorial candidates in three largely Democratic states: Bruce Rauner in Illinois, Larry Hogan in Maryland and Charlie Baker in Massachusetts.

== Presidential politics ==
=== 2012 presidential election ===
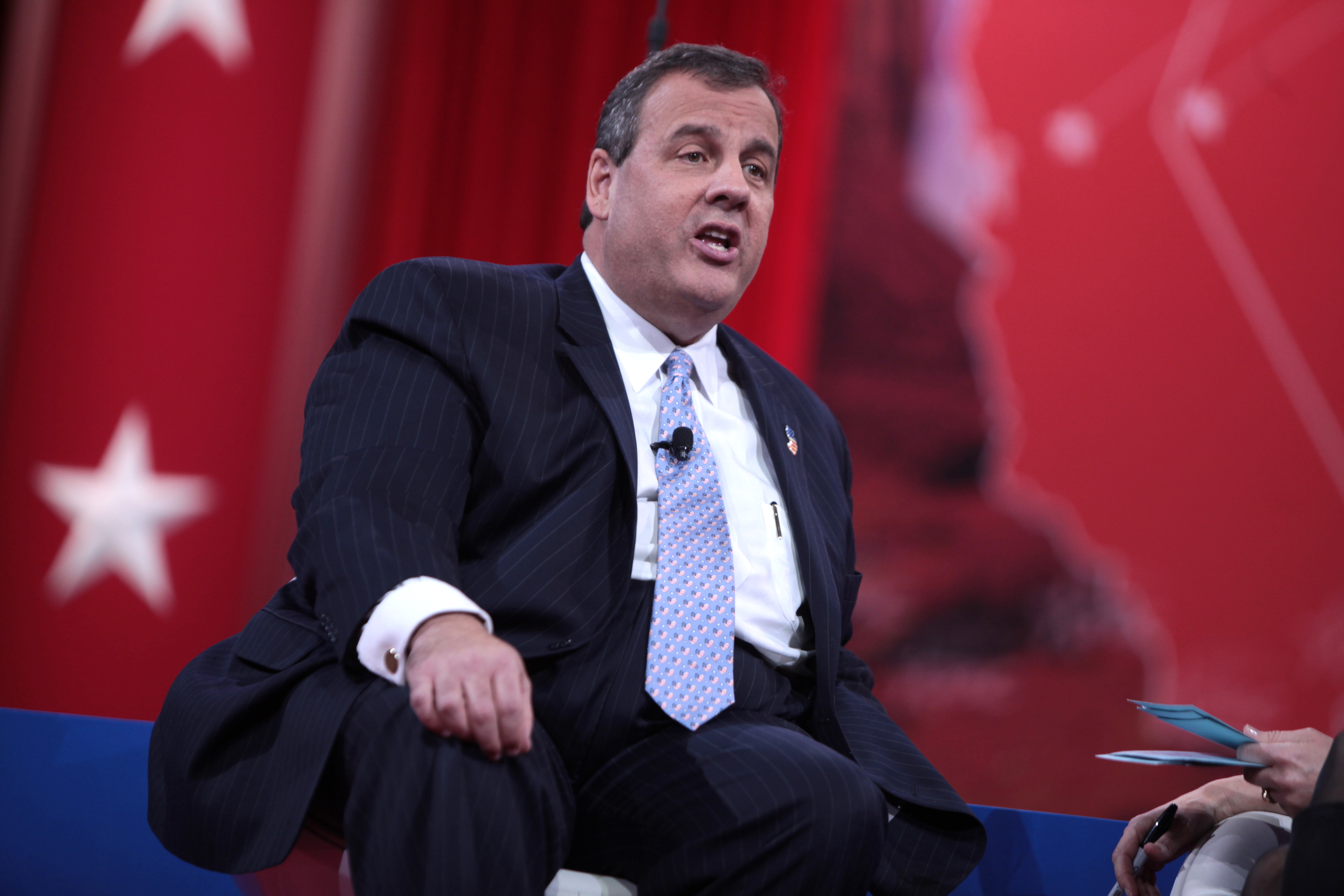
Chris Christie speaking at the Conservative Political Action Conference

There was ongoing speculation that Christie would attempt a run for President of the United States in 2012 by competing in the Republican primaries. In September 2011, a number of press stories cited unnamed sources indicating Christie was reconsidering his decision to stay out of the race. An Associated Press story dated September 30 indicated a decision on whether he would run for president in 2012 would be made "soon". In a late September speech at the Reagan Library, he had again said he was not a candidate for president, but the speech also coincided with his "reconsideration" of the negative decision. The Koch brothers (David H. Koch and Charles G. Koch), Kenneth Langone, and retired General Electric CEO Jack Welch expressed support for a potential Christie candidacy. In October 2011, Christie said that he had reconsidered his decision but had again decided not to run for president, stating at a press conference: "New Jersey, whether you like it or not, you're stuck with me." Christie endorsed Mitt Romney for president a few days later.

Political commentators debated whether Christie's weight would or should affect his viability as a 2012 presidential candidate, either for medical or social reasons. The Obesity Society, a nonprofit scientific group, released a statement asserting, "To suggest that Governor Christie's body weight discounts and discredits his ability to be an effective political candidate is inappropriate, unjust, and wrong."

The New York Post has cited anonymous sources as saying Christie was not willing to give up the governorship to be Romney's running mate because he had doubts about their ability to win. The Romney campaign was reported to have asked him to resign his governorship if he became the vice-presidential nominee because "pay to play" laws restrict campaign contributions from financial corporation executives to governors running for federal office when the companies do business with the governor's state. A memo from the campaign attributed Romney's decision not to choose Christie as his running mate, in part, to unanswered questions during the vetting process regarding a defamation lawsuit following Christie's initial campaign for Morris County Freeholder, a Securities and Exchange Commission investigation of Christie's brother, as well as his weight.

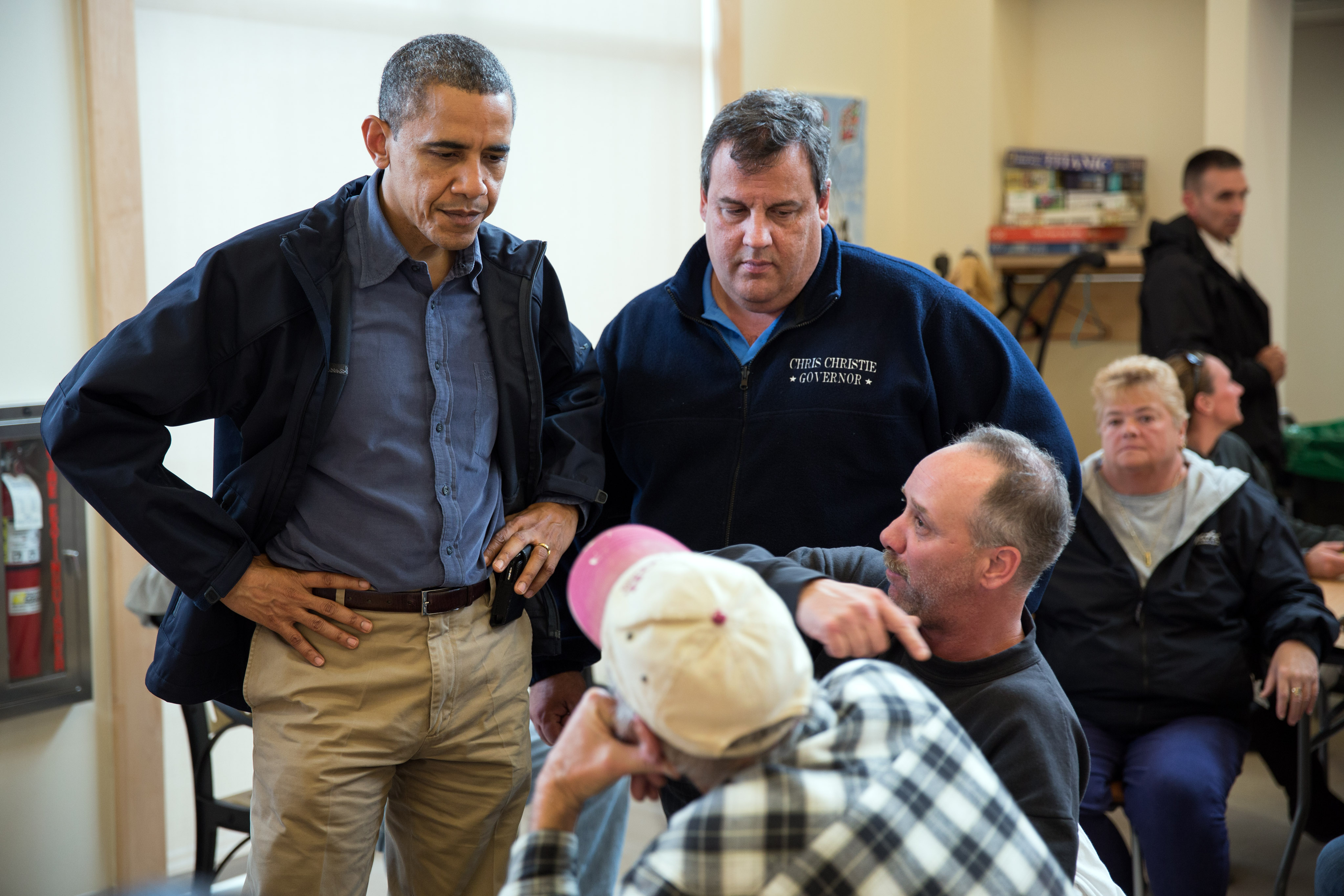
President Barack Obama and Governor Chris Christie talk with local residents in Brigantine, New Jersey.

Christie gave the keynote address at the Republican National Convention in August 2012. On October 30, 2012, during a press conference to discuss the impact of Hurricane Sandy, Christie praised the disaster relief efforts of President Barack Obama.

Christie stated he still supported Mitt Romney and was opposed to many of Obama's policies, but thought Obama deserved credit for his help in the disaster relief in New Jersey. Christie faced significant backlash before and after the election from conservative Republicans who accused him of acting to bolster his own personal political standing at the expense of Romney and the party.

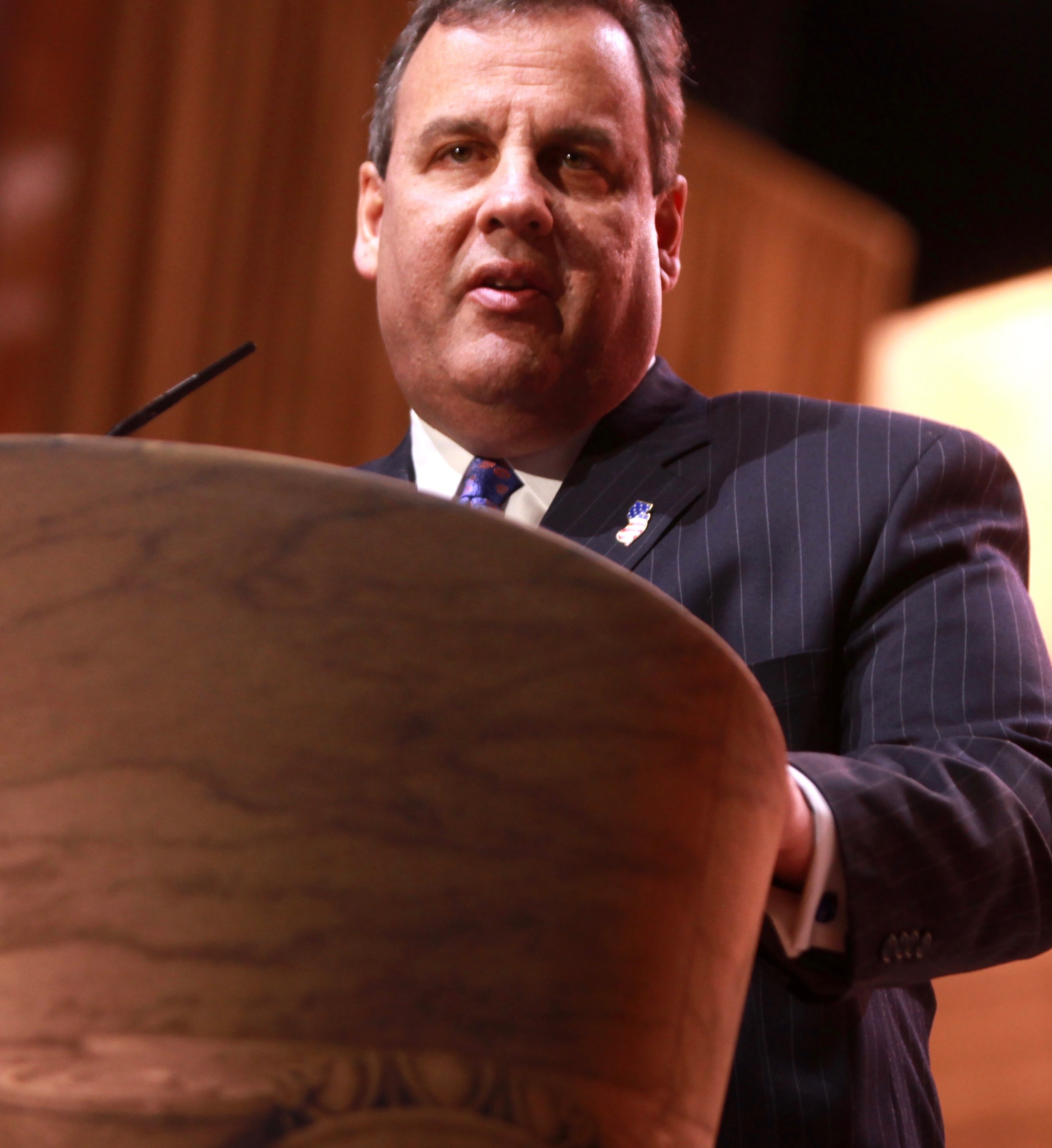
Governor Chris Christie speaking at the 2014 Conservative Political Action Conference (CPAC) in National Harbor, Maryland

In the aftermath of the election, Christie maintained his national profile and continued to clash with conservatives in his party by strongly criticizing House Speaker John Boehner regarding aid for Hurricane Sandy and then the National Rifle Association for their ad that mentioned President Obama's children. Christie was subsequently not invited to speak at the 2013 Conservative Political Action Conference (CPAC), which is largely seen as a stepping-stone for Republicans running for president. The CPAC chair explained that Christie was not invited "for decisions that he made", but that "hopefully next year he's back on the right track and being a conservative".

=== 2016 presidential election ===
In January 2015, Christie took his first formal step towards a presidential candidacy by forming a political action committee (PAC) in order to raise funds and prepare for a likely 2016 presidential bid. On June 27, 2015, Christie launched his presidential campaign website. He formally announced his candidacy on June 30, 2015.

Christie dropped out of the race on February 10, 2016, after the New Hampshire primary following a poor showing and low poll numbers. He received 7.4% of the overall vote in the New Hampshire primary.

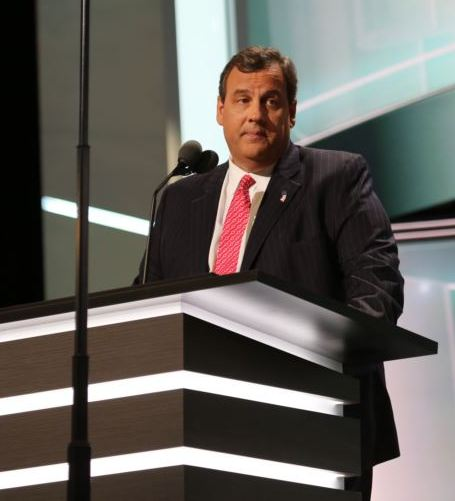
Christie speaking at the 2016 Republican National Convention

Despite having criticized Donald Trump prior to leaving the race, he endorsed Trump on February 26, 2016. On May 9, 2016, Trump named Christie to head a transition team in the event of a Trump presidency. He soon emerged as a major power with the Trump campaign.

Trump considered Christie as a potential vice-presidential running mate, and he was on the shortlist alongside former Speaker of the House Newt Gingrich and Indiana Governor Mike Pence. Trump passed over Christie and selected Pence. The subject's transition list for likely candidates for Trump's National Security Adviser did not include Michael Flynn, but rather, Peter Pace and William H. McRaven.

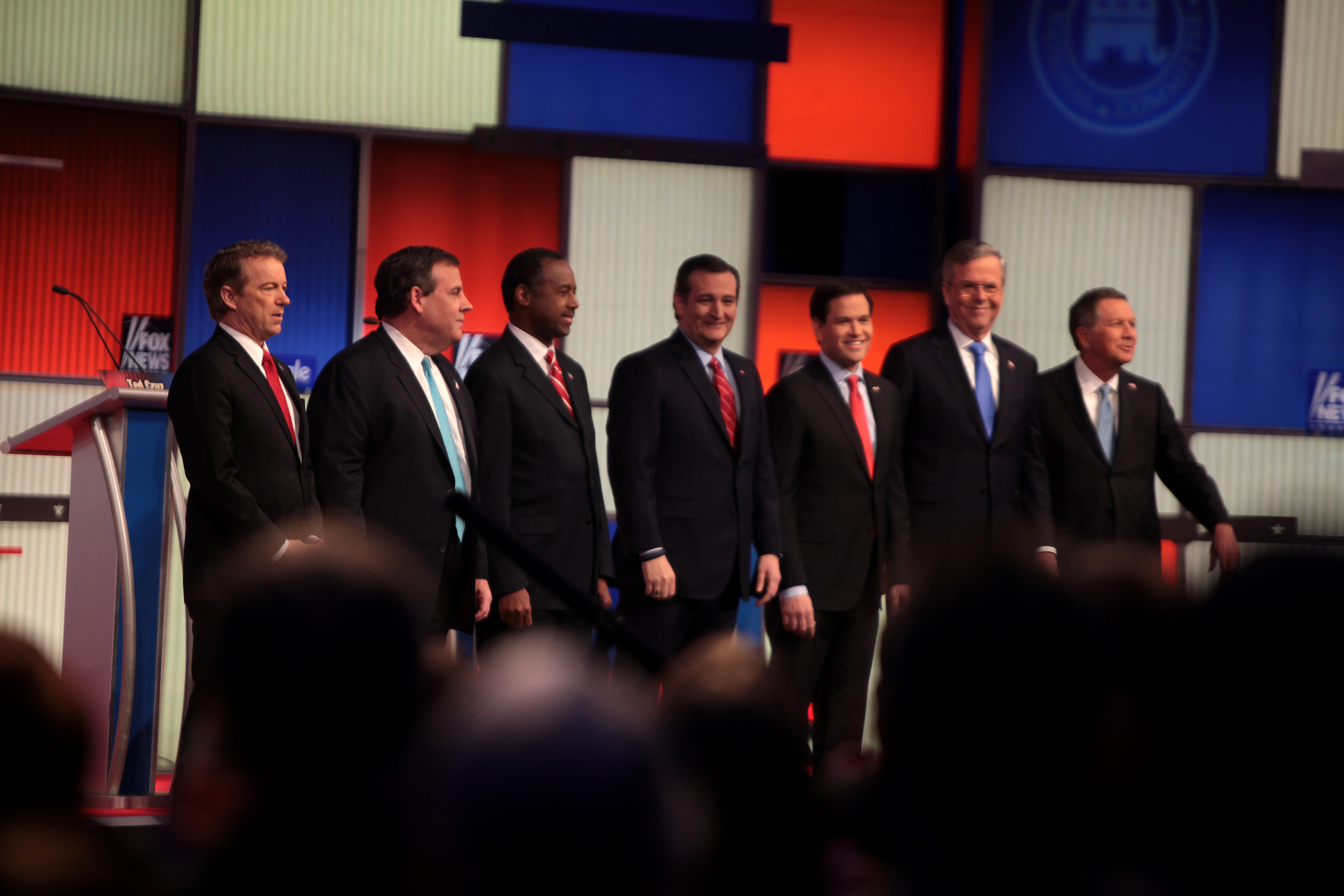
Chris Christie (second to the left) at the final Republican Party presidential debate before the 2016 Iowa caucuses

In September 2016, Christie acknowledged that the Fort Lee lane closure scandal, also known as Bridgegate, was a factor in his being denied the nomination. Trump had said earlier that Christie knew about the closures, which Christie denies. Following the release of Trump's tape-recorded comments on an Access Hollywood bus, Christie called Trump's comments "completely indefensible", but also added "I don't think it's the only way you should make a judgment."

After calls for his impeachment as governor and felony convictions in U.S. federal court of high-ranking members of his staff in the Bridgegate scandal, Christie was dropped by Trump as leader of the transition team, in favor of Pence. On the same day, Christie's close associates Richard Bagger and Bill Palatucci were both removed by Trump from the transition team. Former Congressman Mike Rogers, a national security expert on the Trump transition team, was additionally another close associate of Chris Christie who was also removed a few days after Christie's departure.

Christie was considered for a role in the Trump administration, but said he would serve out his term as governor, which ended in January 2018. On December 11, it was reported that Christie turned down offers to become Secretary of Homeland Security and Secretary of Veterans Affairs, because he wanted to be Attorney General. In February 2017 Politico reported that Christie was offered the role of Secretary of Labor but evidently turned it down. An 18-page report outlining questions and possible concerns about Christie joining the administration was released in June 2019.

=== 2020 presidential election ===
In 2020, Christie offered to help Trump win re-election. One of his roles was helping the president to prepare for his first debate with challenger Joe Biden on September 29, 2020. He visited the White House repeatedly during the four days preceding the debate. He said the prep sessions involved five or six people in total, none of whom wore facial coverings despite the ongoing coronavirus pandemic. He added that he tested negative for the virus each time he entered the White House and saw no-one exhibiting symptoms. On October 3 he tested positive and was hospitalized, calling it a precautionary measure. He was released from the hospital on October 10.

Following the election, Christie refused to support Trump's false claims of a stolen election. On election night, Christie spoke with one of Trump's sons and later texted Eric Trump asking for proof of their claims of election fraud. When they could not provide any evidence, Christie said he would thus not support their claims. During the January 6 Capitol attack, Christie phoned Trump to tell the president to call for an end to the violence, but Trump did not pick up. Following the attack, Christie blamed Trump for January 6 and voiced support for Trump's impeachment.

=== 2024 presidential election ===
In December 2020, Christie told radio talk show host Hugh Hewitt that he was considering running for president in 2024 even if Trump decided to run (who at this point Christie still aligned with). In October 2022, Christie appeared on Real Time with Bill Maher, where he responded "sure" when asked if he was open to a potential 2024 presidential bid. On March 16, 2023, Christie announced that he would decide if he was running for president within 45 to 60 days. During this time, Christie voiced his criticism of Florida governor and Republican presidential candidate Ron DeSantis and his feud with The Walt Disney Company, claiming that the conflict showed DeSantis' lack of conservative values. Christie visited New Hampshire in late March, claiming that he wanted to see if he was ready to "get into the battle".

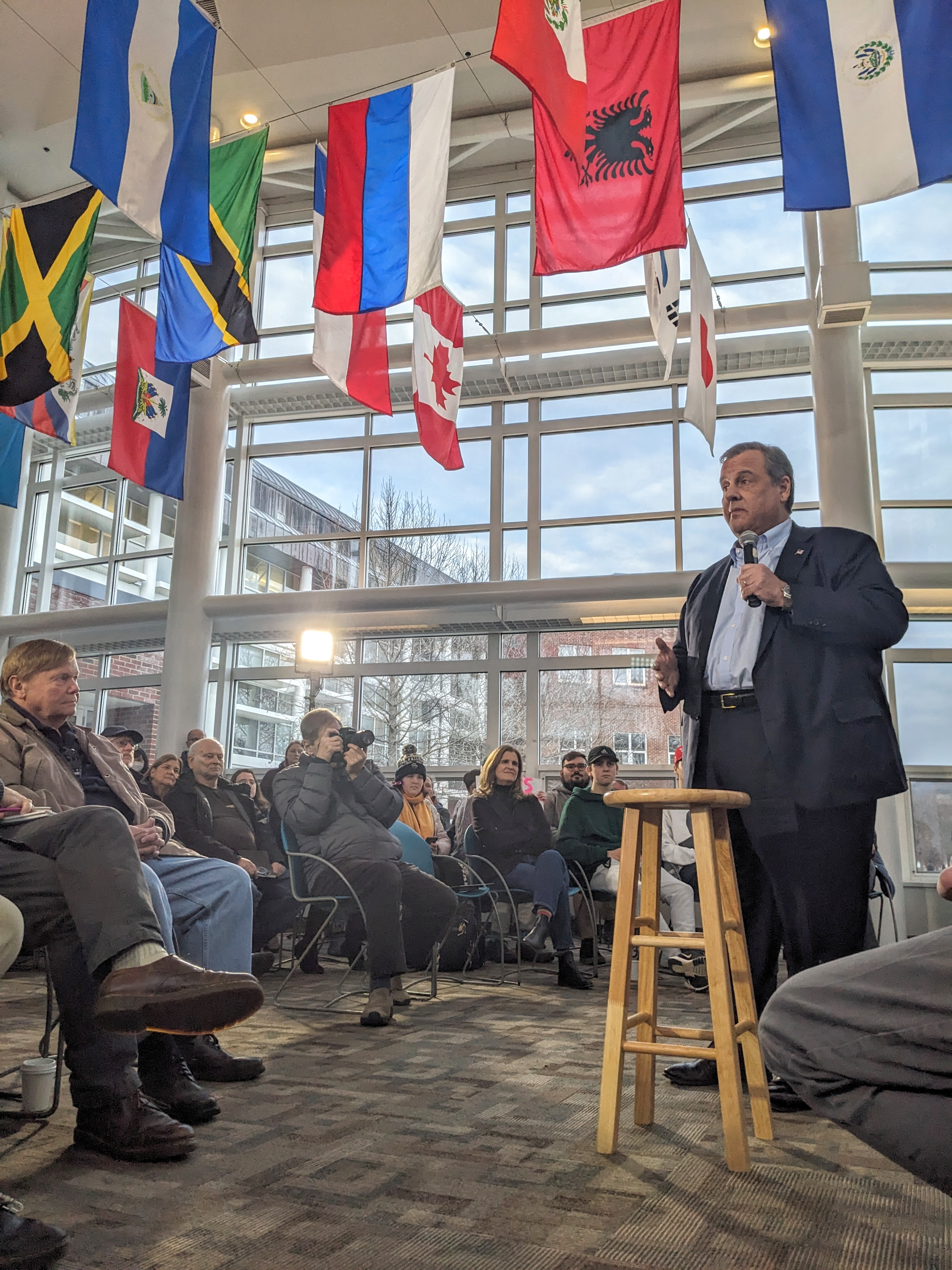
Christie speaking at Keene State College in December 2023

On May 31, 2023, Axios reported that Chris Christie was planning to announce his presidential campaign in the coming days. On June 6, Christie filed paperwork with the Federal Election Commission (FEC) to run for president, announcing his bid later that day at an event in Manchester, New Hampshire.

While campaigning, Christie focused on attacking Trump, including at his campaign launch, where he called Trump a "lonely, self-consumed, self-serving mirror hog." Christie has also attacked other primary contenders for not criticizing Trump enough and defending Trump with regard to his federal indictment for mishandling classified documents and his conduct leading up to and during the January 6 Capitol attack. In order to participate in the Republican primary debates, Christie was required to sign a loyalty pledge from the Republican National Committee stating he would support the eventual nominee. Christie criticized the pledge, calling it a "useless idea," but ultimately signed it in order to debate, citing that Trump himself signed a similar pledge during the 2016 primaries, despite later denouncing it during a debate. As Trump was the frontrunner for the nomination throughout the primary, whether or not Christie would follow through with the pledge was in question.

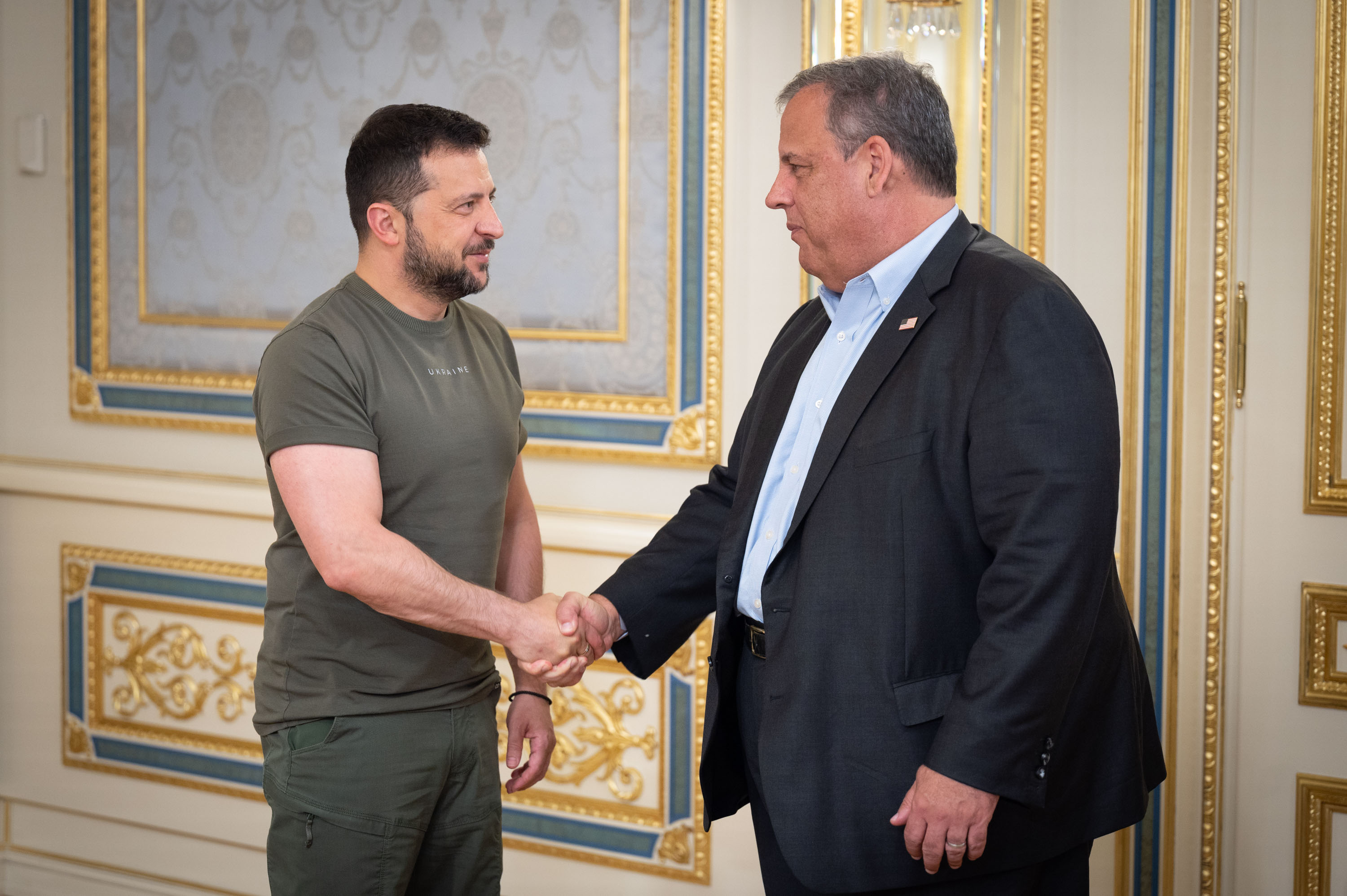
Christie with Ukrainian President Volodymyr Zelenskyy, on August 4, 2023.

Christie supported increasing military aid to Ukraine, labeling current aid as insufficient to defeat the Russian invasion, and stated that arming Ukraine would deter China from potentially invading Taiwan. On August 4, 2023, Christie made an unannounced trip to Ukraine, visiting the city of Bucha, the site of a massacre of civilians by Russian forces. Later in the day, Christie met with Ukrainian President Volodymyr Zelenskyy, praising Ukraine's fight against Russia and reiterating his support for arming Ukraine. According to Christie, he and Zelenskyy did not discuss the U.S. presidential race. Christie was the second Republican presidential candidate, after Mike Pence, to visit Ukraine.

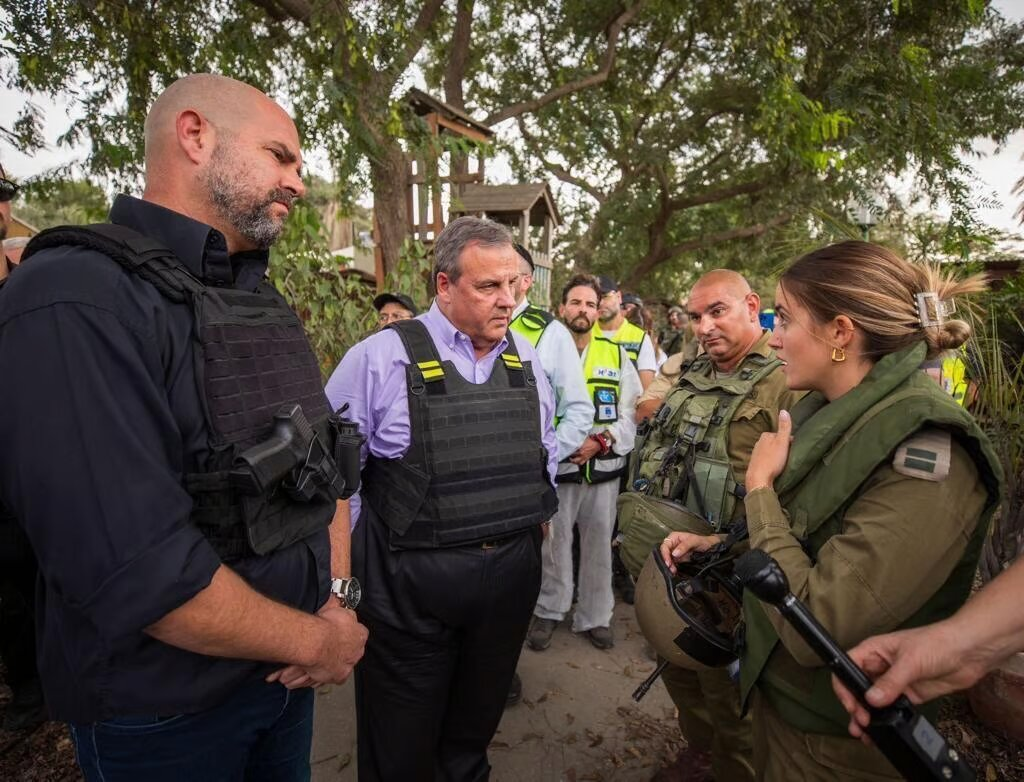
Christie became the only presidential candidate to visit Israel during their Gaza war, on November 12, 2023.

On November 13, 2023, Christie became the first presidential candidate to visit Israel following the 2023 Hamas-led attack on Israel, where approximately 1,200 people were killed and another 240 were taken hostage. Christie visited Kfar Aza, a kibbutz destroyed by Hamas on October 7, at the invitation of the Israeli Foreign Ministry. He also met with Israeli President Isaac Herzog and relatives of the hostages taken by Hamas. Christie voiced support for continuing America support of Israeli military actions against Hamas. During the fourth Republican presidential debate, Christie said that, as president, he would send American troops to help free hostages taken by Hamas. He rejected calls for a ceasefire in the Gaza war.

On January 10, 2024, Christie dropped out of the presidential race at a scheduled town hall meeting in Windham. His campaign had focused on winning the New Hampshire primary, hoping for a subsequent national boost. Christie had been under pressure to dropout after recent polls showed Nikki Haley closing in on Trump in New Hampshire. During his withdrawal address, Christie stressed his decision was made to prevent vote splitting and ensure Trump did not win the primary. However, Christie was not expected to endorse another candidate, including Haley, who was expected to win the vote of a majority of Christie supporters. He has criticized Haley for not ruling out being Trump's vice presidential pick and was caught on a hot mic saying that she was "going to get smoked" in the primaries. Having dropped out just two weeks before the New Hampshire primary, Christie still appeared on the ballot. Trump would ultimately win the New Hampshire primary, beating Haley by an 11-point margin, closer than originally expected. Haley would later drop out after the Super Tuesday primaries in March, making Trump the presumptive Republican nominee.

In late March, Christie announced he had declined to run for president under a No Labels ticket. He said he was encouraged to run, but ultimately refused, believing there was not a viable path for a third party to win the election.

"I appreciate the encouragement I've gotten to pursue a third party candidacy. I believe we need a country that once again feels like everyone has a stake in what we're doing and leadership that strives to bring people together, instead of using anger to divide us. While I believe this is a conversation that needs to be had with the American people, I also believe that if there is not a pathway to win and if my candidacy in any way, shape or form would help Donald Trump become president again, then it is not the way forward."

— Chris Christie, via Twitter

According to The Hill, Christie said he was willing to lead the ticket on the condition of having a Democratic running mate, but the organization was unable to find a suitable candidate. As Christie was one of the final candidates the organization was considering to lead their ticket, No Labels officially abandoned its attempt to run a "unity ticket" on April 4, 2024. Christie has repeatedly stated he would not vote for Trump "under any circumstances", refusing to endorse him unlike other former primary candidates such as Nikki Haley. Both Haley and Christie continued to receive votes in a Republican primaries in the months after their respective campaign suspensions. Earlier in 2023, Christie predicted Trump would be convicted in at least one of his trials by spring 2024, and called him unqualified for the presidency. Trump would ultimately be convicted in his New York hush money trial in late May 2024. During a February interview with the podcast Pod Save America, he said he would consider voting for Democrat Joe Biden, but that he was "not there yet". Later in March, Politico suggested the Biden campaign contact Christie to support his re-election bid in exchange for a potential ambassadorship. Speaking with Washington Post journalist Leigh Ann Caldwell at a forum hosted by the University of Chicago in April, Christie said it was "pretty stupid" that Biden did not reach out to him after he dropped out. He also questioned Biden's ability to complete a second term due to his age. By June, Christie was among several prominent Republicans, including former Vice President Mike Pence and former House Speaker Paul Ryan, who refused to support either candidate in the race.

Despite no longer running for office, Christie has remained active in New Jersey state politics. He endorsed State Senator Jon Bramnick in the 2025 gubernatorial election. He began teaching a course titled "How to Run a Political Campaign" at the Jackson School of Global Affairs for the Fall 2024 semester at Yale University in September.

== Opioid epidemic efforts ==
Christie with President Donald Trump during a meeting concerning opioids and drug abuse, March 2017

In March 2017, Trump picked Christie to chair the Opioid and Drug Abuse Commission, an advisory committee on the opioid epidemic in the United States.

Christie said that New Jersey would be spending $500 million on the epidemic, and in his last few months as governor promoted the Reach NJ Campaign, which included television ads in which he appeared.

In May 2019, Santa Monica, California, tech firm WeRecover announced that Christie had joined their team as Senior Advisor on Strategy and Public Policy. Upon joining Christie said, "As the chairman of the opioid task force, I was honored to shape our federal government's efforts to combat the opioid epidemic. But this isn't a problem government alone can solve. This is the worst epidemic we've ever faced, and we need the kind of innovation that can only come from the private sector. In WeRecover, I've found a team of some of the best and brightest people in tech, fully committed to broadening access to care through data, design and technology."

== Post-gubernatorial career ==
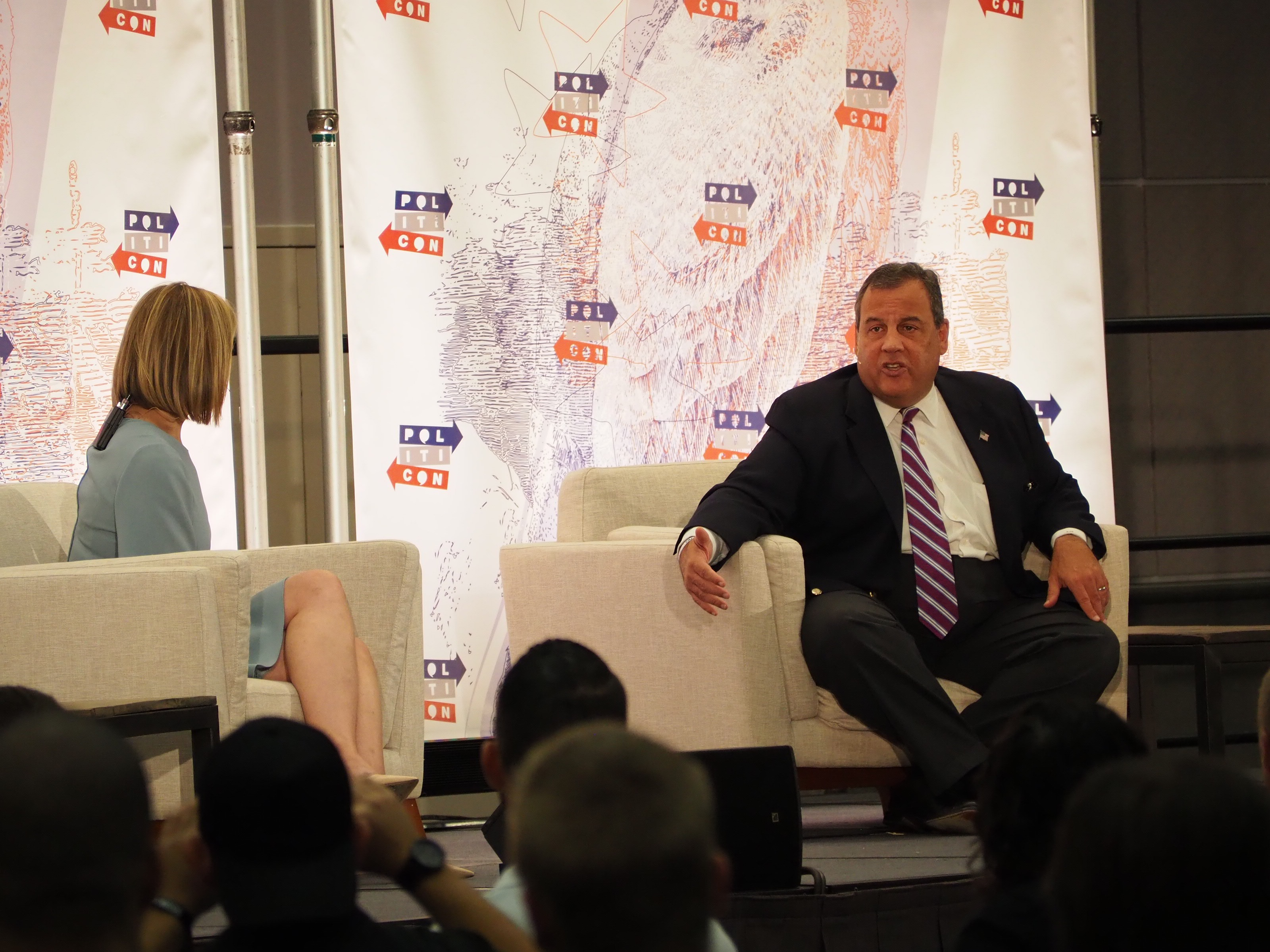
Christie attending Politicon at the Los Angeles Convention Center, October 2018

In January 2018, Christie joined ABC News as a regular network contributor, which he continues to be part. In November 2018, it was reported that he was being considered for the role of United States Attorney General by the Trump administration, although William Barr was ultimately selected. After meeting with Trump into December 2018, Christie said he did not want to be considered for the job of White House Chief of Staff.

Christie published a book titled Let Me Finish in January 2019.

In 2019, Christie became a director of the pharmaceutical firm Pacira Biosciences.

In May 2020, Christie stated that measures taken during the COVID-19 pandemic in the United States should be lifted for economic reasons. "Of course, everybody wants to save every life they can – but the question is, towards what end, ultimately? ... Are there ways that we can ... thread the middle here to allow that there are going to be deaths, and there are going to be deaths no matter what?"

In 2018 Christie started a federal lobbying firm called Christie 55 Solutions. The firm earned roughly $1.3 million during the COVID-19 pandemic before ceasing its operations in 2021. Christie was paid $240,000 during the pandemic for lobbying on behalf of a Tennessee-based chain of addiction treatment centers and three New Jersey hospital systems seeking federal funding.

Christie distanced himself from Donald Trump after the January 6, 2021, attack on the U.S. Capitol. In a September 9, 2021, speech at the Ronald Reagan Library in Simi Valley, California, Christie implored Republicans to reject their most extreme elements such as QAnon, white supremacists and election fraud conspiracy theorists.

In March 2021, Christie joined the board of directors of the New York Mets front office. It was reported in June 2023 that he would remain on the board while running for president.

On August 24, 2025, Christie appeared on the ABC TV program This Week. Christie criticized President Donald Trump for wanting the Justice Department to act "as his personal legal representation." "Donald Trump sees himself as the person who gets to decide everything, and he doesn't care about any separation," Christie said. "In fact, he absolutely rejects the idea that there should be separation between criminal investigations and the politically elected leader of the United States." In response to Christie's remarks, Trump said on social media that Christie "lied" about the 2013 Bridgegate scandal, suggesting he should be investigated again, saying "perhaps we should start looking at that very serious situation again? NO ONE IS ABOVE THE LAW!". The following day Trump told reporters that he "always felt [Christie] was guilty", but that a decision on whether to open a Justice Department investigation on him was up to Attorney General Pam Bondi. This came despite Trump praising Christie in 2020 after Christie was exonerated on the Bridgegate affair, saying at that time, "Congratulations to former Governor of New Jersey, Chris Christie, and all others involved, on a complete and total exoneration (with a 9–0 vote by the U.S. Supreme Court) on the Obama DOJ Scam referred to as 'Bridgegate'".

== Personal life ==
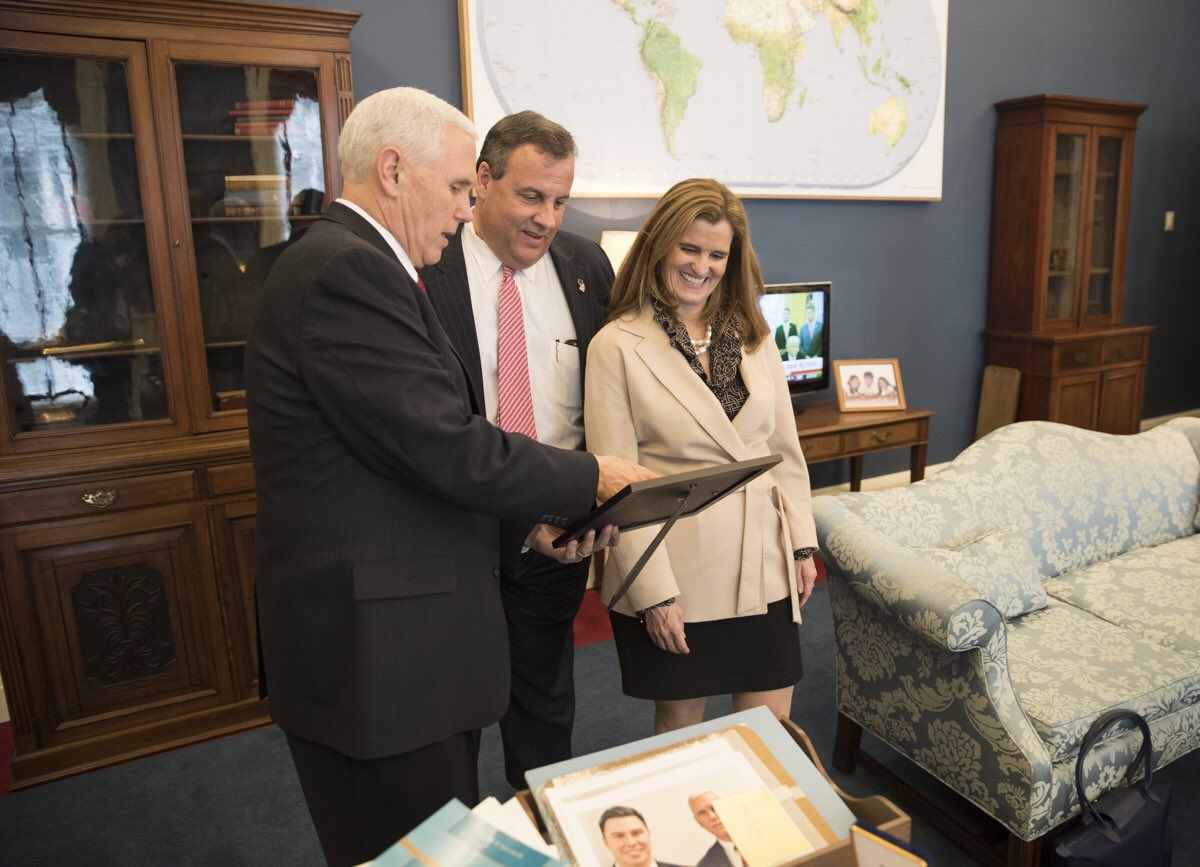
Christie and his wife, Mary Pat, with Vice President Mike Pence in 2017

In 1986, Christie married Mary Pat Foster, a fellow student at the University of Delaware. After marrying, they shared a studio apartment in Summit, New Jersey. Mary Pat Christie pursued a career in investment banking and eventually worked at the Wall Street firm Cantor Fitzgerald; she left the firm in 2001 following the September 11 attacks. As of April 2015 she was a managing director at the Wall Street investment firm Angelo, Gordon & Co.

Christie and his wife have four children: Andrew (b. 1993), Sarah (b. 1996), Patrick (b. 2000), and Bridget (b. 2003). The family resides in Mendham Township. The family also owns a house in Bay Head.

In July 2002, Christie was involved in a traffic accident that injured a motorcyclist on a road in Elizabeth, New Jersey, but was not issued a traffic ticket. The incident came to light in September 2009 when Christie was running for governor.

Christie's hobbies have included coaching Little League, watching the New York Mets, and attending Bruce Springsteen concerts (152 of them). Christie's other favorite sports teams are the New York Knicks, New York Rangers, and Dallas Cowboys. He is a practicing Catholic and member of St. Joseph's Catholic Church.

=== Health ===
In 2011, columnist Eugene Robinson applied the term "extremely obese" to Christie, citing medical guidelines established by the National Institutes of Health. Christie himself was reportedly concerned about his weight and its implications for his health, describing himself as relatively healthy overall. Christie underwent lap-band stomach surgery in February 2013 and disclosed the surgery to the New York Post in May of that year.

On October 3, 2020, Christie tested positive for COVID-19 and was admitted to the Morristown Medical Center in New Jersey the same day, citing asthma as an underlying health concern. On October 10, Christie was released from the hospital. In his 2021 book, Republican Rescue, Christie revealed that Donald Trump called him while he was being hospitalized, and asked "Are you gonna say you got it from me?"

== Bibliography ==
- Let Me Finish, 2019
- Republican Rescue, 2021
- What Would Reagan Do?, 2024

== See also ==
- Electoral history of Chris Christie

Legal offices
Preceded by Robert J. Cleary	United States Attorney for the District of New Jersey; 2002–2008	Succeeded by Ralph Marra
Party political offices
Preceded by Douglas Forrester	Republican nominee for Governor of New Jersey; 2009, 2013	Succeeded by Kim Guadagno
Preceded by Rudy Giuliani	Keynote Speaker of the Republican National Convention; 2012	Succeeded by Joni Ernst
Preceded by Bobby Jindal	Chair of the Republican Governors Association; 2013–2014	Succeeded by Bill Haslam
Political offices
Preceded by Jon Corzine	Governor of New Jersey; 2010–2018	Succeeded by Phil Murphy
U.S. order of precedence (ceremonial)
Preceded by Jim McGreevey as Former Governor	Order of precedence of the United States	Succeeded by Phil Murphy as Former Governor
