= 2006 New Jersey state government shutdown =

First shutdown in the history of the U.S. state of New Jersey

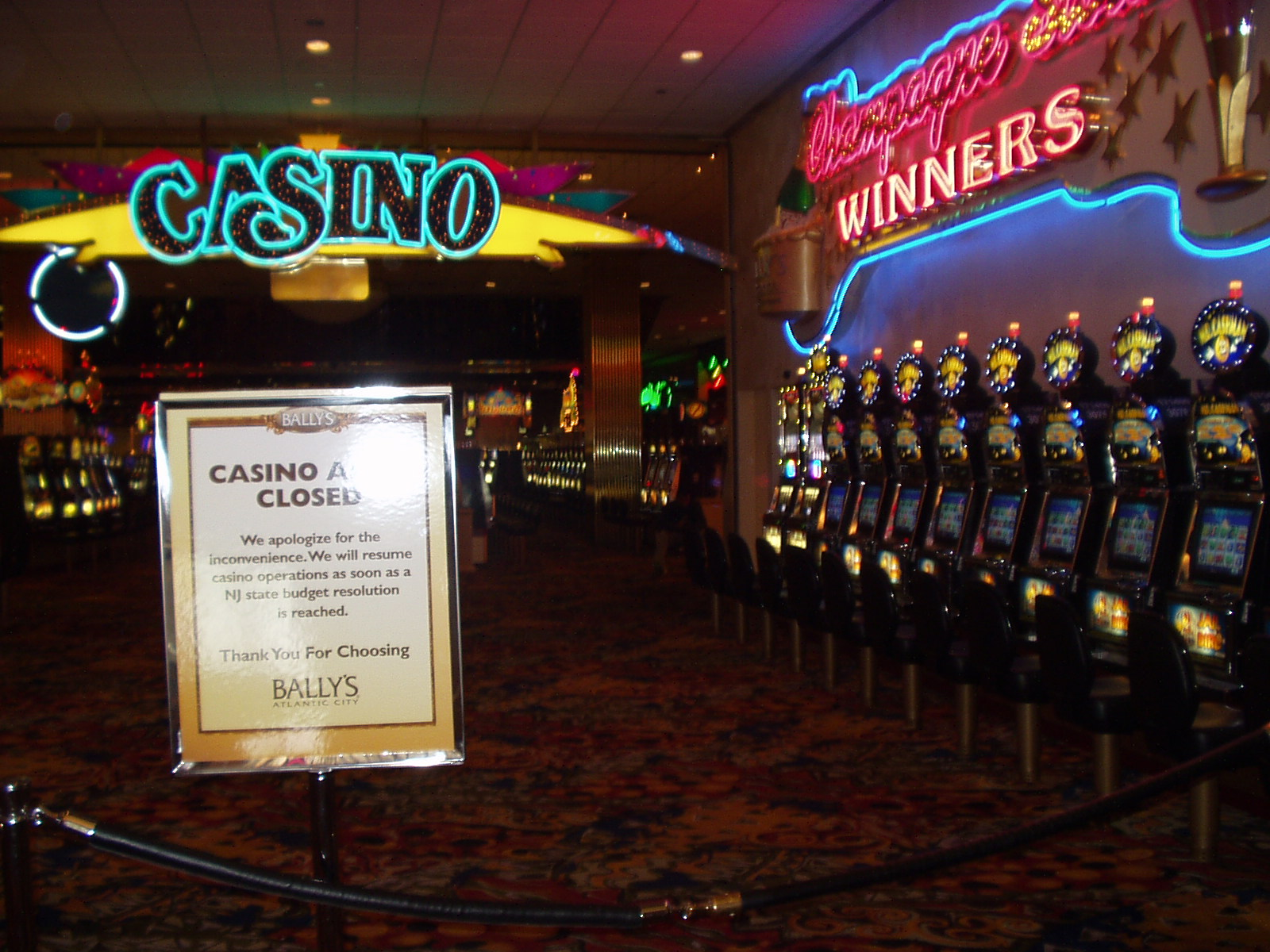
Bally's Atlantic City, a casino, was closed during the government shutdown.

The 2006 New Jersey state government shutdown was the first shutdown in the history of the U.S. state of New Jersey. The shutdown occurred after the New Jersey Legislature and Governor Jon Corzine failed to agree on a state budget by the constitutional deadline. Furthermore, Corzine and the Legislature clashed on the issue of raising the state sales tax to help balance budget. Exercising his constitutional powers as governor, Corzine ordered the shutdown as a means of pressuring the Legislature to pass a budget. The shutdown began at midnight on July 1, 2006, when Corzine called for an orderly shutdown of non-essential government services, which was followed by a second round of shutdowns three days later on July 4.

The shutdown officially concluded after the legislature adopted a budget on July 8, 2006. All government services were restored by 8:30 am on July 10, 2006.

New Jersey would not have another shutdown until July 1, 2017, when the government shut down after failing to pass a budget before the midnight deadline. The shutdown ended on July 3, 2017.

== Background ==
During the 2005 gubernatorial election Corzine, a former executive at Goldman Sachs, claimed he was "not encumbered by an old culture, historical entanglements and the status quo" and had a plan to use his experience to overhaul the budget process and trim spending. When he introduced his first budget as governor, the $30.9 billion plan included $2 billion in spending cuts as well as increases in taxes on tobacco, alcohol, and luxury cars. The most controversial item in the budget was an increase in the state sales tax.

The President of the New Jersey Senate, former Governor Richard Codey, had stated his support for Corzine's budget including the tax increase. The stalemate in the negotiations had been with the New Jersey General Assembly, whose Speaker, Joseph J. Roberts, strongly rejected the Governor's plan. At the time Roberts said, "Our caucus feels overwhelmingly that there are much more appealing alternatives to balance the budget than a sales tax increase."

The New Jersey State Constitution, under Article VIII, Section II, paragraph 2, requires that the state's expenses for "as far as can be ascertained or reasonably foreseen" (i.e., the fiscal year) be provided for in a single budget act. If this does not occur before the previous budget lapses, the same section also outlaws any expenditure of money. The constitution also includes a provision in the previous paragraph preventing appropriations from going into red ink; the New Jersey Supreme Court had interpreted this to exclude loans made to cover shortfalls, and Corzine claimed that the state had a poor credit rating anyway.

In three of the previous five years, the legislature had failed to meet the June 30 deadline. On each of those occasions an agreement had been reached by the morning of July 2. Aides to Corzine claimed that the governor felt he had no choice but to order the shutdown under the state's Constitution.

== Causes ==
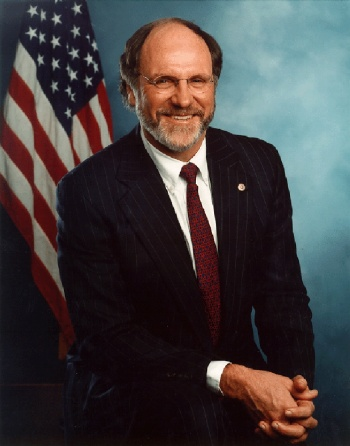
Governor Jon Corzine [Picture taken during his term as U.S. Senator]

Corzine, in attempting to pass his conceptual budget, came into conflict with fellow state Democrats in the New Jersey General Assembly, particularly over their refusal to implement his proposed increase of the state's sales tax from 6% to 7% to fill a $4.5 billion budget gap. Corzine maintained that the gap could not be filled by any other means due to the state's constitution and a ruling of New Jersey's Supreme Court. Long before the deadline date, Corzine had stated that he would not accept a budget that did not include a sales tax increase. Due to Corzine's insistence, the state's General Assembly, which was dominated by Democrats, refused to pass a budget before the deadline.

== The shutdown ==
After the legislature failed to pass a budget by midnight July 1 when the old budget ended, the governor signed executive order number 17 that immediately stopped numerous non-essential government functions, with more to come after the Independence Day holiday on July 4, 2006.

State functions that ceased immediately included the New Jersey Lottery (the interstate Mega Millions game continued although players temporarily could not buy tickets in New Jersey), the New Jersey Motor Vehicle Commission, MVC offices and inspection stations, the New Jersey Department of Education and parts of the New Jersey Judiciary. Approximately 45,000 state employees who were listed as "non-essential" were told to stay home.

Later (post-July 4) shutdowns included state beaches, public parks and historic sites, gambling in New Jersey's casinos in Atlantic City as well as horse racing in the Meadowlands Sports Complex and Monmouth Park Racetrack.

Casinos and race tracks were closed because official monitors from the New Jersey Casino Control Commission and the New Jersey Racing Commission, respectively, were categorized as non-essential. At the time, New Jersey law precluded gambling establishments from operating absent state oversight. Originally, the race tracks were scheduled to close with the first wave on July 1, but a State Court order allowed them to close later. The casinos attempted a similar case, arguing that the state monitors overseeing the casinos were not paid by the state but by the casinos themselves, but the appeal was rejected at the New Jersey Supreme Court; therefore they were forced to close.

According to The Philadelphia Inquirer, "New Jersey Transit, prisons, state police, developmental centers, veterans' homes, mental hospitals, health and disease-prevention offices, child welfare, work on transportation safety, response to environmental contamination, [and] inspectors of amusement parks" were not affected by the order to shut down.

== Post-shutdown governmental action ==
To restore government services, on July 3, 2006, Corzine signed an executive order calling for an unprecedented Independence Day session of the General Assembly to work on presenting him with a budget. Immediately after listening to the governor's speech, the legislature voted by voice vote to adjourn the session. The General Assembly met again, without proposing a budget, the following day.

Meeting on the third day of the special session, Democratic factions within the General Assembly reached a compromise budget. That tentative budget proposed an increase in the state sales tax from 6% to 7%, which was estimated to generate an additional $1.1 billion in revenue. The plan also included a requirement to use half of that for direct relief toward New Jersey's property tax—highest of all states. The plan also called for the same dedicated purpose for all of the money raised by this sales tax increase in subsequent years. The new budget law included a provision for a constitutional amendment which was required, like all such amendments in the state, to be approved in an Election Day referendum. On November 7, 2006, New Jersey voters approved this measure by a two to one margin statewide.

Early in the morning of July 8, 2006, both houses of the legislature passed the proposed budget. At 6:00 am that day, Corzine signed executive order number 19 to restore government services. The casinos in Atlantic City opened for business at 7:00 am Remaining government services, including race tracks and the state lottery, also reopened on July 8, 2006. State courts and motor vehicle offices resumed normal operations on July 10, 2006, fully ending the shutdown.

Corzine used his line-item veto authority to reduce the budget by over $51.3 million by eliminating or reducing over 50 spending items.

== Effects ==
During the casino shutdown, 36,000 casino workers were given leave. The shutdown of casinos resulted in lost revenue for the state, as an estimated $1.3 million per day was collected in gambling taxes plus an additional $2 million per day due to the closure of the lottery system. However, the sum of revenue not collected during the shutdown from gambling amounted to just a small fraction of the state's annual budget. Atlantic City's 12 casinos suffered losses estimated at $16–20 million per day during the shutdown. Revenue losses to lottery vendors and casino employees have not been calculated. Legislation signed by Governor Corzine in June 2008 would keep casinos and racetracks open in the event of a future budget showdown, with the Governor noting that the casino industry is vital to the New Jersey economy and that it should not operate under the threat of closure as it did in 2006.

All driver's licenses and vehicle registrations that were to expire at the end of July were extended one month.

The increase in the rate of the state sales tax from 6% to 7% took effect on July 15, 2006, and also increased the sales tax rate in the state's Urban Enterprise Zones (UEZs) from 3% to 3.5%. A significant change was made in the payment of sales taxes by businesses operating in the UEZs in that they would be required to pay the entire amount of the full tax rate to the state on all appropriate purchases, and wait for the state to rebate them the difference.

The budget also included changes to products and services that are subject to the sales tax, effective October 1, 2006. The newly taxable items included downloaded music, ringtones, movies and books; shipping and handling; drapery and carpet dry cleaning; floor installation; contracted landscaping; self-storage; tanning; massages; tattooing; magazines; investigation and security services such as armored cars and alarm systems; limousines, except for those used in funerals; memberships in health, athletic and shopping clubs; and parking, except for employee parking, parking at municipal meters and parking already subject to municipal parking taxes.

Other immediate tax increases in the budget included an increase in the cigarette tax by $0.175 per pack; a 0.4% surcharge on automobile purchases of over $45,000.00 and on vehicles with an average combined city highway miles per gallon 19 or less; a new 6% tax on fur clothing; an increase in the rental-car tax from $2 to $5 per day; and increases on several business taxes.

These additional revenues were expected, when combined with spending cuts including a reduction of $200 million in higher education spending, to meet the state's balanced-budget requirement. A clause was also inserted into the budget cutting state aid for schools that hold over $1 billion in endowments. The only school in New Jersey that fell into this category was Princeton University, which had an endowment with assets over $11 billion in 2006. The university that had the largest endowment next to Princeton at the time was Drew University which had a $225 million endowment fund.

== Political influences ==
Corzine's shutdown of state government had some effect on New Jersey and national politics. According to Clay F. Richards, assistant director of a poll by the Quinnipiac University Polling Institute, Corzine had a 44% approval rating, his highest since January 2006. The poll also indicated that 71% of respondents disapproved of the legislature's handling of its job. According to Richards, "New Jersey voters clearly blame the state legislature for the budget crisis, and say the property-tax relief that the legislature insisted on in the compromise is more politics than real reform." Of those polled, 23% indicated that they would not vote for those representatives who voted for the sales-tax hike in the future. The legislature's next election was in November 2007, but Corzine did not face re-election until 2009.

There was also speculation that the U.S. Senate race, already seen as tight, would be affected. Republican candidate Thomas Kean, Jr. said Democratic Senator Bob Menendez did not oppose Corzine's tax hike because Corzine appointed Menendez to serve out the remainder of his own term in the Senate.

According to Peter Woolley, director of Fairleigh Dickinson University's PublicMind poll, the situation of the election was similar to the 1990 election, when underdog Senate candidate Christie Whitman, a Republican, nearly defeated well-known Senator Bill Bradley due to Democratic Governor Jim Florio's sales- and income-tax increases. By August, Woolley concluded that the tax increase had had no effect on Menendez's re-election chances.
