= List of The Late Show with Stephen Colbert episodes (2018) =

- No. of episodes: 205 (and 1 special)

Release
- Original network: CBS
- Original release: January 2 – December 21, 2018

Season chronology
- ← Previous; 2017 episodes Next → 2019 episodes

This is the list of episodes of The Late Show with Stephen Colbert that aired in 2018.

== 2018 ==
=== January ===
No.	Original release date	Guest(s)	Musical/entertainment guest(s)
464	January 2, 2018	Anderson Cooper, Maz Jobrani	Margo Price
Anderson Cooper discusses his hosting gig for CNN's New Year's Eve special and recent politics. Maz Jobrani discusses Immigrant, his new stand-up special. Margo Price performs "A Little Pain" from her album All American Made.
465	January 3, 2018	America Ferrera, David Harbour	Julien Baker
America Ferrera discusses Superstore and the MeToo movement. David Harbour discusses Stranger Things. Julien Baker performs "Turn Out the Lights" from her album of the same name.
466	January 4, 2018	50 Cent, Rachel Brosnahan	Gary Vider
50 Cent discusses Den of Thieves. Rachel Brosnahan discusses The Marvelous Mrs. Maisel. Gary Vider gives a stand-up performance.
467	January 5, 2018	Neil deGrasse Tyson	N/A
Neil deGrasse Tyson discusses the interstellar object ʻOumuamua and his book, Astrophysics for People in a Hurry. Late Show Classic: Stephen visits the NASA. Late Show Presents: best moments of the week, including segments with 50 Cent, Maz Jobrani, America Ferrera and Gary Vider.
468	January 8, 2018	Liam Neeson, Michael Wolff	Andra Day & Common
Stephen Colbert's interview of Jake Tapper's interview of Stephen Miller. Liam Neeson discusses The Commuter. Michael Wolff discusses his new book, Fire and Fury: Inside the Trump White House. Andra Day & Common perform "Stand Up for Something", from the film Marshall.
469	January 9, 2018	James Franco, Lena Waithe	Anderson East
James Franco discusses The Disaster Artist (special appearance by Dave Franco) and clarifies the sexual harassment allegations made against him. Lena Waithe discusses her writing background and The Chi. Anderson East performs "Girlfriend" from his album Encore.
470	January 10, 2018	Sarah Jessica Parker, Pete Holmes	Jack Black
A cameo appearance by Laura Benanti as Melania Trump. Sarah Jessica Parker discusses Divorce and goes to prom with Stephen. Pete Holmes discusses Crashing. Jack Black performs "Everybody Polka", from the film The Polka King.
471	January 11, 2018	Molly Shannon, Thomas Lennon	Owen Smith
Stephen Colbert's Midnight Confessions. Molly Shannon discusses The 2018 Rose Parade Hosted by Cord & Tish and Divorce. Thomas Lennon discusses A Futile and Stupid Gesture. Owen Smith gives a stand-up performance.
472	January 12, 2018	Laurie Metcalf, Michael Wolff, Carly Fleischmann	N/A
Brain Fight with Tuck Buckford. Laurie Metcalf discusses Lady Bird. Michael Wolff discusses his new book, Fire and Fury: Inside the Trump White House (interview rebroadcast from January 8 episode). Carly Fleischmann interviews Stephen.
473	January 15, 2018	John Lithgow, Senator Chuck Schumer	The Black Eyed Peas
John Lithgow discusses The Crown and his new Broadway show, Stories by Heart. Senator Chuck Schumer discusses DACA, President Trump's word against Senator Dick Durbin's, and the likelihood of Democrats taking back the Senate and/or House in 2018. The Black Eyed Peas perform "Street Livin'".
474	January 16, 2018	Jon Bon Jovi, Daniel Kaluuya, Ben Sinclair	N/A
Go Fund Yourself. Jon Bon Jovi discusses his induction into the Rock and Roll Hall of Fame. Daniel Kaluuya discusses Get Out. Ben Sinclair discusses High Maintenance.
475	January 17, 2018	Ricky Gervais, Matt Czuchry	Bon Jovi
Donald Trump's endoscopy, featuring The Magic School Bus. Ricky Gervais discusses Child Support. Matt Czuchry discusses The Resident. Bon Jovi performs "You Give Love a Bad Name".
476	January 18, 2018	Sharon Stone, Rob Riggle	Fall Out Boy
The Big Furry Hat. Sharon Stone discusses Mosaic. Rob Riggle discusses 12 Strong. Fall Out Boy performs "Hold Me Tight or Don't" from their album Mania.
477	January 19, 2018	J. K. Simmons, Pete Holmes	N/A
Stephen Colbert's All-Bro High-T Toxic Masculinity Nook (with Rob Riggle; new footage from January 18 episode). J. K. Simmons discusses Counterpart. Pete Holmes discusses Crashing (interview rebroadcast from January 10 episode). Late Show Presents: best moments of the week, including segments with Ricky Gervais, Daniel Kaluuya and Sharon Stone.
478	January 22, 2018	James Corden, Ann Curry	N/A
James Corden discusses his hosting gig for the 60th Annual Grammy Awards. Ann Curry discusses We'll Meet Again.
479	January 23, 2018	John Dickerson, Eugene Levy	Midland
An advertisement from the Vermont Tourism Bureau. Veronica Leahy, from the Grammy Museum, sits in with the band and provides musical accompaniment. John Dickerson discusses CBS This Morning. Eugene Levy discusses Schitt's Creek. Midland performs "Make a Little" from their album On the Rocks.
480	January 24, 2018	Willem Dafoe, RuPaul, Roy Wood Jr.	N/A
Stephen Colbert's Midnight Confessions. Willem Dafoe discusses The Florida Project. RuPaul discusses RuPaul's Drag Race: All Stars. Roy Wood Jr. discusses This Is Not Happening.
481	January 25, 2018	Gwyneth Paltrow, Ben McKenzie	Thirty Seconds to Mars
Stephen's own lifestyle brand, Covetton House, teams up with Goop. Gwyneth Paltrow discusses Goop. Ben McKenzie discusses Gotham. Thirty Seconds to Mars perform "Dangerous Night".
482	January 26, 2018	Kyle MacLachlan, Deon Cole	Julia Michaels
Who is the bigger Elton John fan? (special appearance by Miley Cyrus). Stephen Colbert's Cyborgasm: Home Edition. Kyle MacLachlan discusses his collaborations with David Lynch and Portlandia. Deon Cole discusses Grown-ish. Julia Michaels performs a medley of "Issues", from her album Nervous System, and "Heaven", from the film Fifty Shades Freed.
483	January 29, 2018	Julie Chen, Joel Kinnaman	Talib Kweli featuring BJ the Chicago Kid
Stephen Colbert's interview of Piers Morgan's interview of President Trump. An interview with Cartoon Donald Trump. Julie Chen discusses Celebrity Big Brother. Joel Kinnaman discusses Altered Carbon. Talib Kweli performs "The One I Love" from his album Radio Silence, featuring BJ the Chicago Kid.
Special	January 30, 2018	Jon Favreau, Jon Lovett, Tommy Vietor, Jessica Williams, Phoebe Robinson	Chris Stapleton
Special live episode following the State of the Union Address. The Late Show Presents: The Real State of the Union. Jon Favreau, Jon Lovett and Tommy Vietor discuss recent politics and Pod Save America. Jessica Williams and Phoebe Robinson discuss 2 Dope Queens. A State of the Union response (appearance by Michael Weatherly). Chris Stapleton performs "Drunkard's Prayer" from his album From A Room: Volume 2.
484	January 31, 2018	Rose McGowan, Senator Rand Paul	N/A
Curtis Harding sits in with the band and provides musical accompaniment. A cameo appearance by Laura Benanti as Melania Trump. Rose McGowan discusses her new book, Brave. Senator Rand Paul discusses the State of the Union Address, DACA and the Russian investigation.

=== February ===
No.	Original release date	Guest(s)	Musical/entertainment guest(s)
485	February 1, 2018	Michael Shannon, Meghan McCain	John Mellencamp
Michael Shannon discusses Waco. Meghan McCain discusses her father John's health and her hosting gig for The View. John Mellencamp performs "Easy Target" from his album Sad Clowns & Hillbillies.
486	February 2, 2018	Uma Thurman, Michael Shannon	Jacob Williams
Lassie stars in the new CBS show: FBIDOG. The Late Show's Midterms 2018: Profiles in Discourage (Courtland Sykes). Uma Thurman discusses The Parisian Woman. Michael Shannon and Stephen's charity PSAs: Save the Historic Winfield Theater (new footage from February 1 episode). Jacob Williams gives a stand-up performance.
487	February 5, 2018	Claire Danes, Bernadette Peters	Lil Uzi Vert
Stephen Colbert's Midnight Confessions. Claire Danes discusses Homeland. Bernadette Peters discusses her career in Broadway, Mozart in the Jungle and Hello, Dolly!. Lil Uzi Vert performs "The Way Life Goes" from his album Luv Is Rage 2, with Jon Batiste & Stay Human providing musical accompaniment.
488	February 6, 2018	Wanda Sykes, Thomas Haden Church, June Diane Raphael	N/A
The newest G.I. Joe companion: Cadet Bone Spurs. The Soul Rebels sit in with the band and provide musical accompaniment. Wanda Sykes discusses Talk Show: The Game Show. Thomas Haden Church discusses Divorce. June Diane Raphael discusses Grace and Frankie.
489	February 7, 2018	John Oliver, Beanie Feldstein	Wolfgang Puck
John Oliver discusses Last Week Tonight, recent politics and the Winter Olympics. Beanie Feldstein discusses Lady Bird. Wolfgang Puck cooks a Valentine's Day dinner.
490	February 8, 2018	Joel McHale, Yara Shahidi	Joywave
An editorial response from the year 2100. First Drafts: Valentine's Day Cards. Joel McHale discusses The Joel McHale Show with Joel McHale and A Futile and Stupid Gesture. Yara Shahidi discusses Grown-ish. Joywave performs "Doubt" from their album Content.
491	February 9, 2018	John Oliver, Nathan Lane	N/A
Late Show Cupid Auditions (with Liam Neeson). Late Show Personal Space with John Oliver (new footage from February 7 episode). Nathan Lane discusses Angels in America and The Lion King. Late Show Presents: best moments of the week, including segments with John Oliver, Wanda Sykes and Wolfgang Puck.
492	February 20, 2018	Senator Kirsten Gillibrand, Chris Gethard	Portugal. The Man
Stephen acknowledges the mass shooting at Parkland, Florida. Senator Kirsten Gillibrand discusses recent politics. Chris Gethard discusses The Chris Gethard Show. Portugal. The Man performs "Live in the Moment" from their album Woodstock, with the BK Steppers and the PS22 Chorus providing musical accompaniment.
493	February 21, 2018	Sam Rockwell, J. J. Abrams	Børns
The Dance of the Greasy Son, starring Donald Trump Jr. Stephen presents new items from his own lifestyle brand, Covetton House. Sam Rockwell discusses Three Billboards Outside Ebbing, Missouri. J. J. Abrams discusses Star Wars: Episode IX and The Play That Goes Wrong. Børns performs "I Don't Want U Back" from his album Blue Madonna.
494	February 22, 2018	Christine Baranski, Constance Zimmer	Bon Jovi
Christine Baranski discusses The Good Fight. Christine Baranski and Stephen present The Good Fight: The Musical. Constance Zimmer discusses UnREAL. Bon Jovi performs "When We Were Us" from their album This House Is Not for Sale.
495	February 26, 2018	Jennifer Lawrence, Patton Oswalt	MGMT
Jennifer Lawrence discusses Red Sparrow. Patton Oswalt discusses his new book, I'll Be Gone in the Dark. MGMT performs "Me and Michael" from their album Little Dark Age.
496	February 27, 2018	Kiefer Sutherland, Zoe Lister-Jones, John McWhorter	N/A
The Late Show's Midterms 2018: Profiles in Discourage (Arthur J. Jones). Kiefer Sutherland discusses Designated Survivor. Zoe Lister-Jones discusses Life in Pieces. John McWhorter discusses Lexicon Valley.
497	February 28, 2018	Donald Glover, Omarosa Manigault	Ibeyi
Donald Glover discusses Atlanta. Omarosa Manigault discusses her time in Celebrity Big Brother and her tenure as President Trump's Director of Communications for the Office of Public Liaison. Ibeyi performs "Deathless" from their album Ash, with the Harlem Gospel Choir and Isaiah Barr of Onyx Collective providing musical accompaniment.

=== March ===
No.	Original release date	Guest(s)	Musical/entertainment guest(s)
498	March 1, 2018	Jeff Daniels, Krysten Ritter	Noah Kahan
World's Worst Rap. Jeff Daniels discusses The Looming Tower. Krysten Ritter discusses Jessica Jones and teaches Stephen how to knit. Noah Kahan performs "Hurt Somebody" from his album of the same name.
499	March 2, 2018	Steve Buscemi, Sebastian Maniscalco	N/A
Late Show Presents: Steve Buscemi on the Oscars (and what could have been). Stephen goes to Washington, visits Capitol Hill and speaks to Congressman Adam Schiff, Senator Jeff Flake and Vice Chair of the Senate Intelligence Committee Mark Warner. The Big Furry Hat. Steve Buscemi discusses The Death of Stalin. Sebastian Maniscalco discusses his new book, Stay Hungry.
500	March 5, 2018	David Oyelowo, Chelsea Clinton, Martha Stewart	N/A
Devin Nunes vs. The Late Show (new footage from Stephen's visit to Capitol Hill). David Oyelowo discusses Gringo. Chelsea Clinton discusses her new book, She Persisted Around the World: 13 Women Who Changed History. Martha Stewart discusses her new book, Martha's Flowers, and teaches Stephen how to arrange flowers. Late Show Presents: Rehearsal Rewind.
501	March 6, 2018	Oprah Winfrey, Justin Hartley	N/A
Oprah Winfrey discusses A Wrinkle in Time. Oprah Winfrey gets a sign from God about 2020. Justin Hartley discusses This Is Us. Late Show Presents: Rehearsal Rewind.
502	March 7, 2018	Reese Witherspoon, Adam Rippon	Ben Harper & Charlie Musselwhite
Galino & Farnes: Pornography Attorneys. Reese Witherspoon discusses Time's Up and A Wrinkle in Time. Adam Rippon discusses his time in South Korea for the Winter Olympics. Ben Harper & Charlie Musselwhite perform "Found the One" from their album No Mercy In This Land. Late Show Presents: Rehearsal Rewind.
503	March 8, 2018	Mindy Kaling, Chris Hayes	Amberia Allen
Mindy Kaling discusses A Wrinkle in Time. Chris Hayes discusses recent politics and his book, A Colony in a Nation. Amberia Allen gives a stand-up performance. Late Show Presents: Rehearsal Rewind.
504	March 9, 2018	Helen Mirren, David Byrne	David Byrne
Stephen goes to Washington and speaks to Max Stier, President and CEO of Partnership for Public Service. A cameo appearance by Laura Benanti as Melania Trump. Helen Mirren discusses The Leisure Seeker. David Byrne discusses his career and his new album, American Utopia. David Byrne's Giant Suit Emporium. David Byrne performs "Everybody's Coming to My House".
505	March 12, 2018	Tom Brady	Emmy Blotnick
Tom Brady discusses his career and his new book, The TB12 Method. Emmy Blotnick gives a stand-up performance. Late Show Presents: Rehearsal Rewind.
506	March 13, 2018	Angela Bassett, Jimmy O. Yang	Jack Johnson
The Hungry To Leave Power Games (Rex Tillerson). Angela Bassett discusses Black Panther and 9-1-1. Jimmy O. Yang discusses Silicon Valley and his new book, How To American. Jack Johnson performs "Sleep Through the Static" with Stephen providing musical accompaniment. Late Show Presents: Rehearsal Rewind.
507	March 14, 2018	Paul Giamatti, Sean Bean	Brandi Carlile
Late Show Art Therapy. Paul Giamatti discusses Billions and gets his own wax statue. Sean Bean discusses The Oath. Brandi Carlile performs "The Joke" from her album By the Way, I Forgive You.
508	March 19, 2018	Drew Barrymore, Adam DeVine	Moby
Drew Barrymore discusses Santa Clarita Diet and reads poetry with Stephen. Adam DeVine discusses Game Over, Man!. Moby performs "This Wild Darkness" from his album Everything Was Beautiful, and Nothing Hurt.
509	March 20, 2018	Hilary Swank, Thomas Middleditch	Rory Albanese
Hilary Swank discusses Trust. Thomas Middleditch discusses Silicon Valley. Rory Albanese gives a stand-up performance. Late Show Presents: Rehearsal Rewind.
510	March 21, 2018	Keri Russell & Matthew Rhys, Mindy Kaling	N/A
Working Out with Supreme Court Justice Ruth Bader Ginsburg. Keri Russell and Matthew Rhys discuss The Americans. The Late Show Presents: Maybe Coming Soon, with Mindy Kaling (new footage from March 8 episode). Late Show Presents: best moments of the last two weeks, including segments with Thomas Middleditch, Hilary Swank, Angela Bassett and Adam DeVine. Late Show Presents: Rehearsal Rewind.
511	March 26, 2018	Sean Penn, Sara Gilbert	Bishop Briggs
Stephen Colbert's interview of Anderson Cooper's interview of Stormy Daniels. Sean Penn discusses his writing process and his book, Bob Honey Who Just Do Stuff. Sara Gilbert discusses Roseanne. Bishop Briggs performs "White Flag" from her album Church of Scars.
512	March 27, 2018	Samantha Bee, Leslie Odom Jr., Tom Segura	N/A
Galino & Farnes: Lawyers That Sue Lawyers. More Show, presented by the Nest Video Doorbell. Samantha Bee discusses Full Frontal's new special, "The Great American Puerto Rico". Leslie Odom Jr. discusses his new book, Failing Up. Tom Segura discusses Disgraceful, his new stand-up special.
513	March 28, 2018	Dana Carvey, Simon Pegg	N/A
Stormy Watch. Dana Carvey appears as John Bolton, goes over some never broadcast Dana Carvey Show sketches with Stephen and discusses Too Funny to Fail. Simon Pegg discusses Ready Player One.
514	March 29, 2018	Emily Blunt, John Heilemann & Alex Wagner	Kacey Musgraves
John Bolton's terrifying ideas, sung by Michael Bolton. First Drafts: Easter Cards. Emily Blunt discusses A Quiet Place. John Heilemann & Alex Wagner discuss The Circus: Inside the Greatest Political Show on Earth and Wagner's new book, Futureface. Kacey Musgraves performs "Slow Burn" from her album Golden Hour.
515	March 30, 2018	Bryan Cranston, Jimmy Carter	N/A
Stephen launches his new service: Amishbook. Stephen Colbert's Midnight Confessions. Bryan Cranston discusses Isle of Dogs. Jimmy Carter discusses his tenure as the 39th President of the United States and his new book, Faith. Late Show Presents: best moments of the week, including segments with Simon Pegg, Dana Carvey and Samantha Bee.

=== April ===
No.	Original release date	Guest(s)	Musical/entertainment guest(s)
516	April 9, 2018	Amy Schumer, Madeleine Albright, Giada De Laurentiis	N/A
Crazy Ernie's Electronics. Stormy Watch. Amy Schumer discusses I Feel Pretty. Madeleine Albright discusses recent politics and her new book, Fascism: A Warning. Giada De Laurentiis discusses her new book, Giada's Italy, and steps into the kitchen with Stephen.
517	April 10, 2018	James Spader, Katie Couric, Louie Anderson	N/A
Galino & Farnes: The Attorney Guys. James Spader discusses The Blacklist. Katie Couric discusses Mark Zuckerberg's testimony before the United States Senate and her new documentary, America Inside Out. Louie Anderson discusses his new book, Hey Mom: Stories for My Mother, But You Can Read Them Too.
518	April 11, 2018	Martin Short, Aisha Tyler	N/A
Martin Short discusses An Evening You Will Forget For the Rest of Your Life. Aisha Tyler discusses Axis. Late Show Presents: Rehearsal Rewind.
519	April 12, 2018	Diane Sawyer, Joshua Jackson	John Prine featuring Sturgill Simpson & Brandi Carlile
Stormy Watch. Diane Sawyer discusses her career in journalism and recent politics. Joshua Jackson discusses Children of a Lesser God. John Prine performs "Summer's End" from his album The Tree of Forgiveness, featuring Sturgill Simpson & Brandi Carlile.
520	April 13, 2018	Aubrey Plaza	Rainbow Kitten Surprise
Old White Acres. Queen Elizabeth's Royal Beatdown. Stephen Colbert's Midnight Confessions (special appearance by Cookie Monster). Aubrey Plaza discusses Legion and shows Stephen how to dance salsa. Late Show Backstage Pass. Rainbow Kitten Surprise performs "Fever Pitch" from their album How To: Friend, Love, Freefall.
521	April 16, 2018	John Dickerson, Charlamagne tha God, Nell Scovell	N/A
Stormy Watch. John Dickerson discusses CBS This Morning and recent politics. Charlamagne tha God discusses The Breakfast Club and his new book, Black Privilege. Nell Scovell discusses her new book, Just the Funny Parts. Late Show Presents: Rehearsal Rewind.
522	April 17, 2018	James Comey	Jason Aldean
Stormy Watch. A special appearance by Method Man and Ghostface Killah. James Comey discusses his new book, A Higher Loyalty: Truth, Lies, and Leadership; his relationship with President Donald Trump, his tenure as director of the FBI, and his investigation into Hillary Clinton's emails and his decision to later reopen it. Jason Aldean performs "You Make It Easy" from his album Rearview Town. Late Show Presents: Rehearsal Rewind.
523	April 18, 2018	Cynthia Nixon, Alan Cumming	Franz Ferdinand
Stephen's own lifestyle brand, Covetton House, teams up with Goop for DonorsChoose (special appearance by Gwyneth Paltrow). Cynthia Nixon discusses her campaign for Governor of New York. Alan Cumming discusses Instinct. Alan Cumming and Stephen present Instinct: The Musical. Franz Ferdinand performs "Feel the Love Go" from their album Always Ascending, with James Chance providing musical accompaniment. Late Show Presents: Rehearsal Rewind.
524	April 19, 2018	Antonio Banderas, Senator Kamala Harris	Snow Patrol
Stephen Colbert's What Have We Become? Skeletons In The Cabinet. Antonio Banderas discusses Genius. Antonio Banderas and Stephen sketch each other. Senator Kamala Harris discusses recent politics and her tenure as Senator from California. Snow Patrol performs "Don't Give In" from their album Wildness. Late Show Presents: Rehearsal Rewind.
525	April 20, 2018	James Marsden, Coyote Peterson	N/A
Stephen explores the infamous Ritz Carlton presidential suite in Russia (segment rebroadcast from July 20, 2017 episode). James Marsden discusses Westworld. Community Calendar: Stillwater, Oklahoma. Coyote Peterson discusses Brave Wilderness and brings wild animals to Stephen's desk; Stephen gets bitten by a green anole lizard.
526	April 23, 2018	Jeffrey Wright, Ali Wentworth	Brothers Osborne
A special appearance by Cheech & Chong. Jeffrey Wright discusses Westworld. Ali Wentworth discusses her new book, Go Ask Ali: Half-Baked Advice (and Free Lemonade). Brothers Osborne perform "Shoot Me Straight" from their album Port Saint Joe. Late Show Presents: Rehearsal Rewind.
527	April 24, 2018	Hank Azaria, Ronan Farrow	Grace VanderWaal
The Late Show's Midterms 2018: Profiles in Discourage (Don Blankenship). Hank Azaria discusses The Simpsons and Brockmire. Ronan Farrow discusses recent politics and his new book, War on Peace: The End of Diplomacy and the Decline of American Influence. Grace VanderWall performs "Clearly", with Jon Batiste & Stay Human providing musical accompaniment. Late Show Presents: Rehearsal Rewind.
528	April 25, 2018	Lucy Liu, Henry Winkler	Run the Jewels
Lucy Liu discusses Elementary and her career as a visual artist. Henry Winkler discusses Barry and his days as Fonzie in Happy Days. Run the Jewels perform "Thursday in the Danger Room" from their album Run the Jewels 3. Late Show Presents: Rehearsal Rewind.
529	April 26, 2018	Rachel Weisz, Ann Dowd	N/A
The Big Furry Hat. Rachel Weisz announces her pregnancy and discusses Disobedience. Ann Dowd discusses The Handmaid's Tale. The Late Show Collection: writer Ariel Dumas attends New York Fashion Week.
530	April 27, 2018	Mandy Patinkin, H. Jon Benjamin	N/A
Avengers: Infinity Cast. #FakeAvengersSpoilers. The Late Show's Midterms 2018: Profiles in Discourage (Foster Friess). Mandy Patinkin discusses Homeland. H. Jon Benjamin discusses Archer and his new book, Failure Is An Option; he also discusses his album, Well, I Should Have... and plays the melodica with Jon Batiste. Late Show Presents: best moments of the week, including segments with Rachel Weisz and Henry Winkler.
531	April 30, 2018	David Duchovny, Margaret Brennan, Robert Smigel	N/A
Frank's Banquet Hall. Stephen Colbert comments on Michelle Wolf's White House Correspondents Dinner performance. Stormy Watch. David Duchovny discusses his new book, Miss Subways. Margaret Brennan discusses Face the Nation and recent politics, and announces her pregnancy. Robert Smigel discusses Triumph the Insult Comic Dog and The Week Of.

=== May ===
No.	Original release date	Guest(s)	Musical/entertainment guest(s)
532	May 1, 2018	Helen Hunt, Kevin Smith	Paramore
Helen Hunt discusses Candy Jar. Kevin Smith discusses Silent But Deadly, his new stand-up special, and the aftermath of his heart attack. Paramore performs "Rose-Colored Boy" from their album After Laughter.
533	May 2, 2018	Jim Gaffigan, Michael Avenatti, David Chang	N/A
Jim Gaffigan discusses Noble Ape, his new stand-up special. Michael Avenatti discusses the Stormy Daniels lawsuit against President Trump and presents new evidence against Michael Cohen. David Chang discusses Ugly Delicious.
534	May 3, 2018	Charlize Theron, Ron Howard	N/A
Rudy Giuliani today reacts to Rudy Giuliani yesterday. Stormy Watch. The Late Show's Midterms 2018: Profiles in Discourage – Sad-Denddum (Don Blankenship). Charlize Theron discusses Tully. Ron Howard discusses Solo: A Star Wars Story; Stephen presents a "new trailer". Stephen and J. J. Abrams's Times Square Adventure (Stephen and the audience are invited to Abrams' Broadway show The Play That Goes Wrong).
535	May 4, 2018	Chris O'Donnell, Jack White	Jack White
A cameo appearance by Laura Benanti as Melania Trump. Chris O'Donnell discusses NCIS: Los Angeles. Late Show's Jingle More of the Way with Jack White. Jack White performs "Ice Station Zebra" from his album Boarding House Reach.
536	May 7, 2018	Jim Parsons, Alexis Ohanian	Lake Street Dive
Late Show Exclusive: an interview with Rudy Giuliani. Jim Parsons discusses The Boys in the Band. Alexis Ohanian discusses Reddit, how he met his wife Serena Williams and his venture capital fund Initialized Capital. Lake Street Dive performs "Good Kisser" from their album Free Yourself Up.
537	May 8, 2018	Michael B. Jordan, Matt Walsh	Heather Pasternak
Stephen shows some of the best dresses from the Met Gala. Michael B. Jordan discusses Black Panther and Fahrenheit 451. Matt Walsh discusses Veep and Life of the Party. Heather Pasternak gives a stand-up performance. Late Show Presents: Rehearsal Rewind.
538	May 9, 2018	Gayle King, Anna Wintour	N/A
Stephen Colbert's Midnight Confessions. Gayle King discusses CBS This Morning, her upcoming coverage of the Royal Wedding and her new book, Note to Self. Anna Wintour discusses the best dresses from the Met Gala and invites Stephen to a behind-the-scenes look at the Met's "Heavenly Bodies" exhibit.
539	May 10, 2018	Annette Bening, Wyatt Cenac	Leon Bridges
Late Show Tolerance Tips. First Drafts: Mother's Day Cards. Annette Bening discusses The Seagull. Wyatt Cenac discusses Problem Areas and his early work as a correspondent for The Daily Show. Leon Bridges performs "Beyond" from his album Good Thing.
540	May 11, 2018	Melissa McCarthy, Mayim Bialik, Daniel Boulud	N/A
Community Calendar (with Melissa McCarthy): Plainfield, Illinois. Mayim Bialik discusses The Big Bang Theory and her new book, Boying Up. A special appearance by Run the Jewels: the duo celebrates Stephen's birthday. Daniel Boulud steps into the kitchen with Stephen and celebrates the 25th anniversary of his restaurant.
541	May 14, 2018	Anthony Anderson, Glenda Jackson, Michael Pollan	N/A
Embassy Movers. Anthony Anderson discusses black-ish. Glenda Jackson discusses her political career in the British Parliament and Three Tall Women. Michael Pollan discusses his new book, How to Change Your Mind.
542	May 15, 2018	Jamie Foxx	Nathaniel Rateliff & the Night Sweats
President Trump and Sean Hannity's Pillow Talk. A special appearance by Ryan Reynolds as Deadpool. Jamie Foxx discusses Beat Shazam (special appearance by his daughter Corinne Foxx). Nathaniel Rateliff & the Night Sweats perform "You Worry Me" from their album Tearing at the Seams. A post-credit scene.
543	May 16, 2018	Chadwick Boseman	N/A
Hallmark Cards: The White House Apology Collection. Kids Pitch: Strangest Things: The Golden Mysteries (with appearances by Brooke Shields, Jason Segel, Kathryn Hahn, Hugh Laurie, John Oliver, David Tennant, Michael Shannon, Willem Dafoe, Whoopi Goldberg and Jeff Daniels). Chadwick Boseman discusses Black Panther and Avengers: Infinity War. Mëatbulle.
544	May 17, 2018	Jake Tapper	Erik Bergstrom, Liam Payne & J Balvin
Jales: Diamond-incrusted handcuffs. Jake Tapper discusses recent politics and his new book, The Hellfire Club. Stephen Colbert's Cyborgasm. Erik Bergstrom gives a stand-up performance. Liam Payne & J Balvin perform "Familiar".
545	May 18, 2018	Benedict Cumberbatch	Mary Gallagher
Outside the Royal Wedding. Stephen acknowledges the mass shooting at Santa Fe, Texas. Big Questions with Even Bigger Stars (with Benedict Cumberbatch). Benedict Cumberbatch discusses Patrick Melrose and plays a thumb war with Stephen. Mary Gallagher gives a stand-up performance. Late Show Presents: best moments of the week, including segments with Jake Tapper, Ryan Reynolds and Jamie Foxx.
546	May 21, 2018	Zachary Quinto, Vanessa Bayer, Dean Baquet	N/A
"Crossfire Hurricane" (special appearance by Scott Adsit). Late Show Teen Secrets: Middle-Aged Edition. Zachary Quinto confirms Star Trek 4 is in development and discusses The Boys in the Band. Vanessa Bayer discusses Ibiza. Dean Baquet discusses The New York Times' process in covering President Trump and the upcoming documentary The Fourth Estate.
547	May 22, 2018	Andrew Garfield, David Cross	The Kills
Stephen is joined throughout the show by Rachel Olmer, winner of the Next for Autism Omaze raffle. Who Is The Mole? Jon Stewart makes a cameo appearance from under Stephen's desk. Andrew Garfield discusses Angels in America. David Cross discusses Arrested Development and his "Oh Come On" tour. The Kills perform "List of Demands (Reparations)".
548	May 23, 2018	Jason Bateman, Stephen King	Jim James
Jason Bateman discusses Arrested Development. Stephen King discusses his new book, The Outsider. Jim James performs "Just A Fool" from his album Uniform Distortion.
549	May 24, 2018	Anne Hathaway, David Sedaris	Ahmed Bharoocha
Cohen Corner. The Late Show's Midterms 2018: Profiles in Discourage (Joe Arpaio, Kelli Ward and Craig Brittain). Anne Hathaway discusses Ocean's 8. David Sedaris discusses his new book, Calypso. Ahmed Bharoocha gives a stand-up performance.

=== June ===
No.	Original release date	Guest(s)	Musical/entertainment guest(s)
550	June 4, 2018	Ethan Hawke, Toni Collette	Jeff Arcuri
Straight Cakes Bakery. Ethan Hawke discusses First Reformed. Toni Collette discusses Hereditary. Jeff Arcuri gives a stand-up performance.
551	June 5, 2018	Bill Clinton & James Patterson, Tig Notaro	N/A
In Search of The First Lady (special appearance by Scott Adsit). Bill Clinton & James Patterson discuss recent politics and their new book, The President Is Missing. Tig Notaro discusses Star Trek: Discovery and Happy to Be Here, her new stand-up special.
552	June 6, 2018	Mandy Moore, Sara Bareilles & Josh Groban	Meghan Trainor
A response from The Commander of Cheese. FBI Training Video #127: How to Safely Breakdance with Your Firearm. Mandy Moore discusses This Is Us. Sara Bareilles & Josh Groban discuss their upcoming hosting gig for the 72nd Tony Awards. Sara Bareilles, Josh Groban and Stephen present The Tony Awards: The Musical. Meghan Trainor performs "Let You Be Right".
553	June 7, 2018	Nick Offerman, Niecy Nash	Lykke Li
Stormy Watch. Nick Offerman discusses Hearts Beat Loud. Stephen shows Nick Offerman a bench of the show's staff's creation. Niecy Nash discusses Claws. Lykke Li performs "Deep End" from her album So Sad So Sexy.
554	June 8, 2018	Jeff Glor, David Koechner	Interpol
The Donald Trump Summit Spectacular. World premiere: a trailer for the "new" Episode IX. Stephen visits Wrigley Field in support of the Chicago Cubs (segment rebroadcast from September 22, 2016 episode). Jeff Glor discusses CBS Evening News and recent politics. David Koechner discusses his "Symphony of Chaos" tour. Interpol performs "The Rover" from their album Marauder.
555	June 11, 2018	Chris Matthews, Alicia Silverstone	Eels
Chris Matthews discusses Hardball and recent politics. The Big Furry Hat. Alicia Silverstone discusses American Woman. Eels perform "Bone Dry" from their album The Deconstruction.
556	June 12, 2018	Ed Helms, Michael K. Williams, Tom Papa	N/A
Stephen Colbert's interview of George Stephanopoulos's interview of President Trump. An advertisement from the North Korea Tourism Bureau. The Summit of All Fears: Mission Kim-possible 2: Singapore Drift. Ed Helms discusses Tag. Michael K. Williams discusses Superfly. Tom Papa discusses his new book, Your Dad Stole My Rake.
557	June 13, 2018	Anthony Scaramucci & Michael Avenatti	Chromeo featuring DRAM
Cohen Corner. Anthony Scaramucci & Michael Avenatti discuss recent politics, including the recent Singapore Summit between President Trump and Kim Jong-un, and Rudy Giuliani's performance as part of Trump's legal team. Chromeo performs "Must've Been" from their album Head Over Heels, featuring DRAM.
558	June 14, 2018	Natalie Portman, Marc Maron	alt-J featuring Pusha T & Twin Shadow
Hillary Clinton: Impeachment Watch. Natalie Portman discusses Eating Animals. Marc Maron discusses WTF and GLOW. alt-J perform "In Cold Blood" from their album Relaxer, featuring Pusha T & Twin Shadow.
559	June 15, 2018	Thandie Newton, Betty Gilpin	N/A
A Message from the NRA. First Drafts: Father's Day Cards. Thandie Newton discusses Westworld. Betty Gilpin discusses GLOW. Late Show Presents: best moments of the week, including segments with Anthony Scaramucci, Michael Avenatti and Natalie Portman.
560	June 18, 2018	Benicio del Toro, Alison Brie, Robin Thede	N/A
The Devil's Advocate. Benicio del Toro discusses Sicario: Day of the Soldado. Alison Brie discusses GLOW. Robin Thede discusses The Rundown.
561	June 19, 2018	Josh Brolin, Ruth Negga	Walk the Moon
The Late Show's Midterms 2018: Profiles in Discourage (Scott Lively). Josh Brolin discusses Sicario: Day of the Soldado and Avengers: Infinity War. Thanos Reads Trump Tweets. Ruth Negga discusses Preacher. Walk the Moon performs "Kamikaze" from their album What If Nothing.
562	June 20, 2018	Trevor Noah, Liza Koshy	Two Feet
An interview with Stephen Miller (special appearance by Peter Grosz). Trevor Noah discusses The Daily Show, recent politics and his new book, The Donald J. Trump Presidential Twitter Library. Liza Koshy discusses her YouTube channel and Double Dare. Two Feet performs "I Feel Like I'm Drowning". Late Show Presents: Rehearsal Rewind.
563	June 21, 2018	Don Lemon, Mike Colter	Death Cab for Cutie
Tactical Pants. Don Lemon discusses CNN Tonight and recent politics. "In Search of Central Jersey": Stephen talks to Governor Phil Murphy (special appearance by Jon Stewart). Mike Colter discusses Luke Cage. Death Cab for Cutie performs "Gold Rush" from their album Thank You for Today. Late Show Presents: Rehearsal Rewind.
564	June 22, 2018	Seth Rogen	Danny Jolles
Russian Roundup. Seth Rogen discusses Preacher. Late Show Personal Space with Seth Rogen. Danny Jolles gives a stand-up performance.
565	June 25, 2018	Jessica Chastain, Romesh Ranganathan, Scott Rogowsky	N/A
Late Show Commemorable Moments. Jessica Chastain discusses Woman Walks Ahead. Romesh Ranganathan discusses Just Another Immigrant. Scott Rogowsky discusses HQ Trivia. Late Show Presents: Rehearsal Rewind.
566 (Note: Episode being titled as The Late Show with the Guy on CBS.)	June 26, 2018	Hugh Grant, Margaret Hoover	Sean Donnelly
Emergency Late Night Video Conference (special appearances by Jimmy Fallon and Conan O'Brien). A cameo appearance by Laura Benanti as Melania Trump. Hugh Grant discusses A Very English Scandal. Margaret Hoover discusses Firing Line. Sean Donnelly gives a stand-up performance.
567	June 27, 2018	Paul Rudd, Ken Jeong	Florence and the Machine
Stephen Colbert's Midnight Confessions. Paul Rudd discusses Ant-Man and the Wasp. Ken Jeong discusses his new comedy tour. Florence and the Machine performs "Hunger" from their album High as Hope.
568	June 28, 2018	Michael Moore, Eric Andre & Derrick Beckles, Alexandria Ocasio-Cortez	N/A
Jon Stewart makes a cameo appearance from under Stephen's desk. Michael Moore discusses Fahrenheit 11/9 and recent politics. Eric Andre & Derrick Beckles discuss Mostly 4 Millennials. Alexandria Ocasio-Cortez discusses her win in the primary elections.

=== July ===
No.	Original release date	Guest(s)	Musical/entertainment guest(s)
569	July 9, 2018	Gordon Ramsay, Andrew Rannells	Shye Ben Tzur, Jonny Greenwood & The Rajasthan Express
Late Show's Counterpoint from a Man Who Just Got Hit on the Head with a Sack of Bricks. The Hungry to Leave Power Games (Scott Pruitt). Gordon Ramsay discusses 24 Hours to Hell and Back. Andrew Rannells discusses The Boys in the Band. Shye Ben Tzur, Jonny Greenwood & The Rajasthan Express perform "Junun" from their album of the same name.
570	July 10, 2018	Will Arnett, Neve Campbell, Marcus Samuelsson	N/A
Will Arnett discusses Teen Titans Go! To the Movies. Neve Campbell discusses Skyscraper. Marcus Samuelsson discusses No Passport Required and steps into the kitchen with Stephen. Late Show Presents: Rehearsal Rewind.
571	July 11, 2018	Dwayne Johnson	Alessia Cara
Dwayne Johnson discusses his wrestling and acting careers, and Skyscraper. Alessia Cara performs "Growing Pains".
572	July 12, 2018	Lawrence O'Donnell, Liv Tyler	Young the Giant
The Red Hot Congressional Strzok-Fest 2018. Lawrence O'Donnell discusses recent politics and his book, Deadly Force. Liv Tyler recreates a scene from The Lord of the Rings with Stephen and discusses Harlots. Young the Giant performs "Simplify".
573	July 13, 2018	Carey Mulligan	Kate the Chemist
Earl Chives: World's Largest Plane Painter. Late Show's Uninformed Correspondent. Carey Mulligan discusses Girls & Boys. Kate the Chemist steps into the lab with Stephen. Late Show Presents: best moments of the week, including segments with Dwayne Johnson and Liv Tyler.
574	July 16, 2018	Armie Hammer, Colleen Ballinger, Paula Poundstone	N/A
Armie Hammer discusses Straight White Men. Colleen Ballinger discusses her character Miranda Sings and her new book, My Diarrhe. Paula Poundstone discusses Nobody Listens to Paula Poundstone.
575	July 17, 2018	Chrissy Metz, Lewis Black	Luke Combs
Stephen Colbert's post-Summit interview of Sean Hannity's interview of President Trump. Chrissy Metz discusses This Is Us and her new book, This is Me. Lewis Black discusses recent politics and the forthcoming opening of the National Comedy Center. Luke Combs performs "One Number Away" from his album This One's for You.
576	July 18, 2018	Anderson Cooper & Andy Cohen, Dominic Cooper	Beck
Schoolhouse Rock! Presents: Double Negative Junction. Anderson Cooper & Andy Cohen discuss AC²: An Intimate Evening. Dominic Cooper discusses Preacher and Mamma Mia! Here We Go Again. Beck performs "Colors" from his album of the same name. Late Show Presents: Rehearsal Rewind.
577	July 19, 2018	Denzel Washington, Representative Joe Kennedy III	Carmen Lagala
Presidential Intervention. Denzel Washington discusses The Equalizer 2. Representative Joe Kennedy III discusses recent politics. Carmen Lagala gives a stand-up performance.
578	July 20, 2018	Janelle Monáe	Janelle Monáe
Stephen visits Citi Field and the New York Mets with ideas for modernizing baseball. Janelle Monáe discusses her new album, Dirty Computer. Stephen Colbert's Midnight Confessions. Janelle Monáe performs "Americans".
579	July 23, 2018	Eric Holder, John Cleese	Arctic Monkeys
Stormy Watch: Karen McDougal Edition. Eric Holder discusses recent politics and confirms he is considering a 2020 presidential bid. The Big Furry Hat (with John Cleese). John Cleese discusses his career in acting and celebrates the 30th anniversary of A Fish Called Wanda. Arctic Monkeys perform "The Ultracheese" from their album Tranquility Base Hotel & Casino.
580	July 24, 2018	Michael McFaul, Tatiana Maslany, Brian Huskey	N/A
Santa Rosa Estate Wineyards. Michael McFaul discusses recent politics and his new book, From Cold War to Hot Peace. Tatiana Maslany discusses Orphan Black and Mary Page Marlowe. Brian Huskey discusses Veep and Mr. Neighbor's House. Late Show Presents: Rehearsal Rewind.
581	July 25, 2018	John Dickerson, Michaela Watkins	N/A
Michael Cohen's Secret Videotape. Stormy Watch: Karen McDougal Edition. John Dickerson discusses CBS This Morning and recent politics. A message from Netflix: Take a Break And Have Sex (cameo appearances by Alison Brie and Mike Colter). Michaela Watkins discusses Casual.
582	July 26, 2018	Jake Tapper, Michael Peña	Dua Lipa
Jake Tapper discusses recent politics and his book, The Hellfire Club. Michael Peña discusses his beginnings in Chicago and Extinction. Dua Lipa performs "IDGAF" from her eponymous album. Late Show Presents: Rehearsal Rewind.
583	July 27, 2018	Laura Linney	Sasheer Zamata
Galino & Farnes: Secret Tape Attorneys. The Late Show's unofficial rock band (special appearance by FLAW). Laura Linney discusses Ozark. Lin-Manuel Miranda and Stephen present "Button! The American Musical" (segment rebroadcast from December 11, 2015 episode). Sasheer Zamata gives a stand-up performance.
584	July 30, 2018	Judd Apatow, Jace Norman	OneRepublic
Rudy Giuliani vs. Rudy Giuliani on Michael Cohen. Stephen acknowledges the sexual misconduct allegations made against the CEO and president of CBS, Leslie Moonves. Judd Apatow discusses The Zen Diaries of Garry Shandling and Juliet, Naked. Jace Norman discusses Henry Danger. OneRepublic performs "Connection".
585	July 31, 2018	Paul Giamatti, Ronda Rousey, Paul Mecurio	N/A
Religious Liberty Task Force. Barack Obama & Joe Biden in: This Isn't Donald Trump. Paul Giamatti discusses Lodge 49. Ronda Rousey discusses Mile 22. Paul Mecurio discusses Permission to Speak.

=== August ===
No.	Original release date	Guest(s)	Musical/entertainment guest(s)
586	August 1, 2018	Ewan McGregor, Adam Pally	N/A
Prison or Pardon? Ewan McGregor discusses Christopher Robin and his work as an ambassador for UNICEF UK. Adam Pally discusses Dog Days. Stephen learns macroeconomics on a rollercoaster with economist Paul Krugman. Late Show Presents: Rehearsal Rewind.
587	August 2, 2018	Chloë Grace Moretz, Bobcat Goldthwait	Katie Hannigan
Wearable Art by Bijan. Chloë Grace Moretz discusses The Miseducation of Cameron Post. Bobcat Goldthwait discusses Misfits & Monsters. Katie Hannigan gives a stand-up performance.
588	August 3, 2018	Rob Reiner	N/A
A-ha feat. Robert Mueller: "Take On Manafort". Rob Reiner discusses Shock and Awe. Working Out with Supreme Court Justice Ruth Bader Ginsburg (segment rebroadcast from March 21, 2018 episode). Late Show Presents: best moments of the week, including segments with Ronda Rousey, Paul Giamatti and Bobcat Goldthwait.
589	August 6, 2018	Chris Hayes, Rob Corddry	Regina Spektor
Steven Seagal is: Special Envoy. Stephen acknowledges the wildfires currently happening in California. Stephen on the Floor: a make-up tutorial. Chris Hayes discusses All In and recent politics. Rob Corddry discusses Ballers. Regina Spektor performs "Samson". Late Show Presents: Rehearsal Rewind.
590	August 7, 2018	Joe Manganiello, Senator Cory Booker	N/A
Brain Fight with Tuck Buckford. Joe Manganiello discusses Dungeons & Dragons and "Death Saves", his new streetwear line. Senator Cory Booker discusses recent politics. Late Show Presents: Rehearsal Rewind.
591	August 8, 2018	Jim Acosta, Nina Dobrev	Michael Palascak
The Trump Postcards. A Rare Correkshun. Late Show's Milk Update. Jim Acosta discusses recent politics. Nina Dobrev discusses Dog Days. Michael Palascak gives a stand-up performance.
592	August 9, 2018	Issa Rae, Darren Criss, Ronny Chieng	N/A
Issa Rae discusses Insecure. Darren Criss discusses The Assassination of Gianni Versace: American Crime Story. Ronny Chieng discusses Crazy Rich Asians and International Student.
593	August 13, 2018	Nicki Minaj, Guy Pearce	Mac Miller
Nicki Minaj discusses her new album, Queen. Guy Pearce discusses The Innocents. Mac Miller performs "Ladders" from his album Swimming, with Jon Batiste & Stay Human providing musical accompaniment. Late Show Presents: Rehearsal Rewind.
594	August 14, 2018	Mark Wahlberg, Senator Bernie Sanders	N/A
Stephen Colbert's Cyborgasm. Mark Wahlberg discusses Wahlburgers and Mile 22. Senator Bernie Sanders discusses recent politics.
595	August 15, 2018	Jessica Biel, W. Kamau Bell	Elle King
Stephen Colbert's Millennial Tutorial: Pay Phone Edition. Jessica Biel discusses The Sinner. W. Kamau Bell discusses recent politics and his book, The Awkward Thoughts of W. Kamau Bell. Elle King performs "Shame".
596	August 16, 2018	Tommy Vietor, Jon Favreau, Jon Lovett, Constance Wu	N/A
Now That's What I Call Racist! Stephen and Jon Batiste acknowledge the death of Aretha Franklin. A cameo appearance by Laura Benanti as Melania Trump. Tommy Vietor, Jon Favreau and Jon Lovett discuss recent politics and Pod Save America. Constance Wu discusses Crazy Rich Asians. A Late Show Tribute to Aretha: Stephen remembers her performance at the Kennedy Center Honors in 2015.

=== September ===
No.	Original release date	Guest(s)	Musical/entertainment guest(s)
597	September 4, 2018	John Krasinski, Yvonne Orji	N/A
John Krasinski discusses A Quiet Place and Jack Ryan. "John Krasinski Is An Action Star Now" (cameo appearance by Ellie Kemper). Yvonne Orji discusses Insecure.
598	September 5, 2018	Rob Lowe, John Kerry	N/A
Reading Rainbow: Bob Woodward's Fear: Trump in the White House. Rob Lowe discusses The Bad Seed. John Kerry discusses recent politics and his new book, Every Day Is Extra. John Kerry and Stephen remember John McCain. Late Show Presents: Rehearsal Rewind.
599	September 6, 2018	Emma Thompson, Troye Sivan	Troye Sivan
Clue: White House Edition. Stephen acknowledges the death of Burt Reynolds. Late Show Presidential Leak-crets. Emma Thompson discusses The Children Act. Troye Sivan discusses Boy Erased. Troye Sivan performs "Plum" from his album Bloom. A Late Show Tribute to Burt Reynolds.
600	September 7, 2018	Sharon Osbourne	Kathleen Madigan, Jay Rock
Late Show's Uninformed Correspondent: Russia Edition. Sharon Osbourne discusses The Talk. Kathleen Madigan gives a stand-up performance. Jay Rock performs "Win" from his album Redemption.
601	September 10, 2018	Bob Woodward	The Knocks featuring Foster the People
Stephen acknowledges Leslie Moonves' resignation as CEO and president of CBS. Bob Woodward discusses his new book, Fear: Trump in the White House. The Knocks perform "Ride or Die" from their album New York Narcotic, featuring Foster the People.
602	September 11, 2018	Neil deGrasse Tyson, Michael Rapaport	N/A
Stephen acknowledges the threat of Hurricane Florence in Southeastern United States. Stormy Watch. Late Show Presents: Shallow Dives. Neil deGrasse Tyson discusses Space Force and his new book, Accessory to War. Michael Rapaport discusses Atypical. Late Show Presents: Rehearsal Rewind.
603	September 12, 2018	Keira Knightley, Representative Beto O'Rourke, Martha Stewart	N/A
Stephen acknowledges the threat of Hurricane Florence in Southeastern United States. Stormy Watch. Keira Knightley discusses Colette. Beto O'Rourke discusses recent politics and his candidacy for the Texas Senate. Martha Stewart steps into the kitchen with Stephen and discusses her new book, Pressure Cooker. Late Show Presents: Rehearsal Rewind.
604	September 13, 2018	John Heilemann & Alex Wagner, Judy Greer	First Aid Kit
Stephen acknowledges the threat of Hurricane Florence in Southeastern United States. Stephen recalls items from his own lifestyle brand, Covetton House. John Heilemann & Alex Wagner discuss recent politics and The Circus: Inside the Greatest Political Show on Earth. Judy Greer discusses A Happening of Monumental Proportions. First Aid Kit performs "Fireworks" from their album Ruins. Late Show Presents: Rehearsal Rewind.
605	September 14, 2018	Anna Kendrick	Anne-Marie
C-SPAN: Booknotes. Stephen acknowledges the threat of Hurricane Florence in Southeastern United States. Stormy Watch. Anna Kendrick discusses A Simple Favor. Sturgill Simpson performs a song for the Waffle House jukebox with Stephen (segment rebroadcast from April 18, 2016 episode). Anne-Marie performs "2002" from her album Speak Your Mind.
606	September 18, 2018	"Admit It, You Forgot This Happened"	N/A
Stephen presents highlights from the show's third year, including segments with a vast selection of guests.
607	September 19, 2018	Jane Fonda, Willie Nelson	Willie Nelson
Stormy Watch. Stephen acknowledges the impact of Hurricane Florence in Southeastern United States. Jane Fonda discusses Jane Fonda in Five Acts. Willie Nelson, from his tour bus, discusses his career and his new album, My Way. Willie Nelson performs "Summer Wind". Late Show Presents: Rehearsal Rewind.
608	September 20, 2018	Tiffany Haddish, Iain Armitage	N/A
Whose Boat Is This Boat? Middle-Aged Man Wisdom. Tiffany Haddish discusses Night School. Iain Armitage discusses Young Sheldon. Late Show's Dear Famous People (cameo appearances by David Duchovny, Jeff Daniels, Wyatt Cenac, Henry Winkler, Simon Pegg, Sharon Stone and Helen Hunt). Late Show Presents: Rehearsal Rewind.
609	September 21, 2018	Hillary Rodham Clinton	N/A
Stephen and Neil deGrasse Tyson test drive NASA's new Mars rover. Late Show Presents: Stephen and Neil Do Science! Hillary Clinton discusses recent politics and her book, What Happened.
610	September 24, 2018	Emma Stone, Bret McKenzie & Jemaine Clement	Flight of the Conchords
Rescue Dog Rescue with Emma Stone. Emma Stone discusses Maniac. Bret McKenzie & Jemaine Clement discuss Flight of the Conchords: Live at the London Apollo, their new special. Flight of the Conchords perform "Father & Son". Late Show Presents: Rehearsal Rewind.
611	September 25, 2018	America Ferrera, Nas	Nas
Stephen Colbert's interview of Fox News' interview of Brett Kavanaugh. Late Show Presents: Meanwhile. America Ferrera discusses Superstore and her new book, American Like Me. Nas discusses his new album, Nasir. Nas performs "Adam and Eve", with Jon Batiste providing musical accompaniment.
612	September 26, 2018	Candice Bergen, Jacinda Ardern	Jon Batiste
Netflix presents: Donald Trump: Hail-Arity to the Chief. Candice Bergen discusses Murphy Brown. Jacinda Ardern, Prime Minister of New Zealand, discusses recent politics. Jon Batiste performs "Don't Stop" from his album Hollywood Africans.
613	September 27, 2018	Jeff Bridges, Cedric the Entertainer	N/A
GOP senators try relating to Dr. Christine Blasey Ford (special appearance by Scott Adsit). Jeff Bridges discusses Living In the Future's Past and Bad Times at the El Royale. Cedric the Entertainer discusses The Neighborhood.
614	September 28, 2018	Kristen Bell, Mark Leibovich	Nik Dodani
How Many Times Can Trump Interrupt Women In One Press Conference? Stephen interviews President Trump's new White House attorney (special appearance by Jeff Bridges). Kristen Bell discusses The Good Place. Mark Leibovich discusses his new book, Big Game: The NFL in Dangerous Times. Nik Dodani gives a stand-up performance.

=== October ===
No.	Original release date	Guest(s)	Musical/entertainment guest(s)
615	October 1, 2018	Jake Tapper, Eric Idle	Lauv featuring Julia Michaels
Kim Jong-un writes a letter to President Trump. Jake Tapper discusses recent politics and his book, The Outpost: An Untold Story of American Valor. Eric Idle discusses his new book, Always Look on the Bright Side of Life: A Sortabiography. Lauv performs "There's No Way", featuring Julia Michaels. Late Show Presents: Rehearsal Rewind.
616	October 2, 2018	Eva Longoria, Damon Wayans Jr., Steve Kornacki	N/A
UB40 featuring Brett Kavanaugh: "Red, Red Wine". Late Show Presents: Meanwhile. Eva Longoria discusses Reversing Roe. Damon Wayans Jr. discusses Happy Together. Steve Kornacki discusses recent politics and his new book, The Red and the Blue: The 1990s and the Birth of Political Tribalism. Late Show Presents: Rehearsal Rewind.
617	October 3, 2018	Nick Kroll, Jodie Whittaker	Cat Power
Nick Kroll discusses Big Mouth. Jodie Whittaker discusses Doctor Who. Cat Power performs "Woman" from her album Wanderer.
618	October 4, 2018	Lady Gaga	N/A
Ken Burns Presents: The Kavanaugh Letters. Late Show Presents: Flight Attention. Lady Gaga discusses her early career, recent politics and A Star Is Born.
619	October 5, 2018	Ellie Kemper, Sam Elliott	N/A
Kavanaugh Beer. Late Show Presents: Less Depressing News. Senior Youth Correspondent: Richard Kind investigates VidCon. Ellie Kemper discusses her new book, My Squirrel Days. Sam Elliott discusses A Star Is Born and reads Lady Gaga lyrics.
620	October 15, 2018	Melissa McCarthy, Phoebe Robinson	N/A
Stephen Colbert's interview of Lesley Stahl's interview of President Trump. Stephen acknowledges the impact of Hurricane Michael in Florida. Melissa McCarthy discusses Can You Ever Forgive Me?. Phoebe Robinson discusses 2 Dope Queens and her new book, Everything's Trash, But It's Okay. Late Show Presents: Rehearsal Rewind.
621	October 16, 2018	Lin-Manuel Miranda, Brooke Baldwin	N/A
Stormy Watch. Fuddtuckers. A cameo appearance by Laura Benanti as Melania Trump. Lin-Manuel Miranda discusses his new book, Gmorning, Gnight!: Little Pep Talks for Me & You. Brooke Baldwin discusses American Woman and recent politics. Late Show Presents: Rehearsal Rewind.
622	October 17, 2018	Peter Dinklage, Busy Philipps	Noname
Visit Canada. Late Show Presents: Meanwhile. Peter Dinklage discusses Game of Thrones and My Dinner with Hervé. Busy Philipps discusses Busy Tonight and her new book, This Will Only Hurt a Little. Noname performs a three-song medley ("Blaxploitation", "Prayer Song" and "Don't Forget About Me") from her album Room 25.
623	October 18, 2018	Joe Scarborough & Mika Brzezinski, Laura Benanti	The Revivalists
The newest ad for cereal (special appearance by Scott Adsit). Joe Scarborough & Mika Brzesinski discuss recent politics; Brzesinski also discusses her book, Know Your Value. Laura Benanti discusses her recurrent Melania Trump impression for the show, her new children's album, Singing You Home, and My Fair Lady. The Revivalists perform "All My Friends" from their album Take Good Care.
624	October 19, 2018	Robin Wright, Melissa McCarthy	Caitlin Peluffo
Big Bird Auditions. Late Show's Just One Question (special appearances by Hillary Clinton and Willie Nelson). Robin Wright discusses House of Cards. Wright or Wrong? Maybe Coming Soon, with Melissa McCarthy (new footage from October 15 episode). Caitlin Peluffo gives a stand-up performance.
625	October 22, 2018	Sarah Silverman, Scott Bakula	Transviolet
Sarah Silverman discusses I Love You, America. Scott Bakula discusses NCIS: New Orleans. Transviolet performs "Undo" from their album Valley.
626	October 23, 2018	Jon Favreau, Jon Lovett, Tommy Vietor, Charlamagne tha God	N/A
Jon Favreau, Jon Lovett and Tommy Vietor discuss recent politics and Pod Save America. Charlamagne tha God discusses his new book, Shook One: Anxiety Playing Tricks On Me.
627	October 24, 2018	Gerard Butler, Rowan Atkinson, Ina Garten	N/A
Tuesday the 6th: Voting Day. Late Show Presents: Meanwhile. Gerard Butler discusses Hunter Killer. Rowan Atkinson discusses Johnny English Strikes Again. Ina Garten steps into the kitchen with Stephen and discusses her new book, Cook Like a Pro: Recipes and Tips for Home Cooks.
628	October 25, 2018	Gayle King	Andrea & Matteo Bocelli
Stephen acknowledges the mail bombing attempts that occurred in the US. Gayle King discusses CBS This Morning and recent politics. Andrea Bocelli and his son Matteo perform "Fall On Me", from Andrea's album Sí.
629	October 26, 2018	Dr. Phil McGraw, Kayli Carter	Janelle Monáe
The Late Show's 1,000,000th Turtle Comparison. Late Show Presents: Celebrity Spokesmania (special appearance by Emma Thompson). Dr. Phil McGraw discusses Dr. Phil. Kayli Carter discusses Private Life. Janelle Monáe performs "Make Me Feel" from her album Dirty Computer.
630	October 29, 2018	Kerry Washington, Taylor Mac	Taylor Mac
Stephen acknowledges the mass shooting at Pittsburgh, Pennsylvania. First Drafts: Halloween Cards. Kerry Washington discusses American Son. Taylor Mac discusses A 24-Decade History of Popular Music. Taylor Mac performs "People Have the Power".
631	October 30, 2018	Sarah Jessica Parker, Representative Nancy Pelosi	Christine and the Queens
A Donald J. Trump Film: The Caravan. Late Show Presents: Meanwhile. Sarah Jessica Parker discusses Here and Now and celebrates the 25th anniversary of Hocus Pocus. Representative Nancy Pelosi discusses the upcoming Midterms and recent politics. Christine and the Queens perform "Comme Si" from her album Chris.
632	October 31, 2018	Mike Myers, Christiane Amanpour	N/A
Mike Myers discusses Bohemian Rhapsody. Christiane Amanpour discusses Amanpour and recent politics.

=== November ===
No.	Original release date	Guest(s)	Musical/entertainment guest(s)
633	November 1, 2018	Chris Wallace, Cole Sprouse	Tony Bennett
Donald Trump's Open Book. Chris Wallace discusses the upcoming Midterms and recent politics. Cole Sprouse discusses Riverdale. Tony Bennett performs "Love Is Here to Stay" from his album of the same name.
634	November 2, 2018	Billy Eichner, Itzhak Perlman	Itzhak Perlman
An interview with the President. Billy Eichner discusses Billy on the Street and Glam Up the Midterms. Itzhak Perlman discusses the 60th anniversary of his appearance at The Ed Sullivan Show and performs a medley of "Caprice in A minor" and "Someone to Watch Over Me", with Jon Batiste providing musical accompaniment.
635	November 5, 2018	Triumph the Insult Comic Dog, Jude Law, Senator Amy Klobuchar	N/A
"'Twas The Night Before Election Day" (cameo appearance by Jake Gyllenhaal). Triumph the Insult Comic Dog meets Beto O'Rourke and Ted Cruz at their respective rallies in Texas. Jude Law discusses Fantastic Beasts: The Crimes of Grindelwald and Captain Marvel. Senator Amy Klobuchar discusses recent politics and her run for re-election in the State of Minnesota.
636	November 6, 2018	John Heilemann & Alex Wagner, Hasan Minhaj	N/A
Special live episode following the Midterms. Stephen sings "We're Stuck In This Together". Late Show Breaking News (special appearances by Scott Bakula and Donnie Wahlberg). John Heilemann & Alex Wagner discuss the Midterms results. Hasan Minhaj discusses Patriot Act.
637	November 7, 2018	Chris Pine, Major Garrett	N/A
Chris Pine discusses Outlaw King. Major Garrett discusses recent politics and his new book, Mr. Trump's Wild Ride.
638	November 8, 2018	Billy Crystal, Senator Kirsten Gillibrand	N/A
Billy Crystal discusses the Midterms results, and remembers his first appearance on The Tonight Show Starring Johnny Carson and his Oscars hosting gigs. Stephen acknowledges the mass shooting at Thousand Oaks, California. Senator Kirsten Gillibrand discusses recent politics and her new book, Bold and Brave.
639	November 9, 2018	Alexander Skarsgård, Triumph the Insult Comic Dog	Big Red Machine
Your Congressional Body and You. "Whose Boat Is This Boat?": A Late Show Hurricane Relief Spectacular. Alexander Skarsgård discusses Big Little Lies and The Little Drummer Girl. Triumph the Insult Comic Dog "discusses" the Midterms results and "#IVotedPoopOnMe". Big Red Machine performs "Gratitude" from their self-titled album.
640	November 12, 2018	Hugh Jackman, Jeff Tweedy	Jeff Tweedy
Stephen acknowledges the wildfires currently happening in California. The Six-String Soldiers sit in with the band and provide musical accompaniment. Stephen acknowledges the passing of Stan Lee. Hugh Jackman discusses The Front Runner. Jeff Tweedy discusses his new book, Let's Go (So We Can Get Back). Jeff Tweedy performs "Let's Go Rain" from his album WARM.
641	November 13, 2018	Rachel Weisz, Jason Mantzoukas	Demetri Martin
A special appearance by Dolph Lundgren as Ivan Drago. Late Show Presents: Meanwhile. Rachel Weisz discusses The Favourite. Jason Mantzoukas discusses The Long Dumb Road. Demetri Martin gives a stand-up performance. Late Show Presents: Rehearsal Rewind.
642	November 14, 2018	Ricky Gervais, Bianna Golodryga, Flynn McGarry	N/A
Policy Time with Kelly & Trump. Ricky Gervais discusses his radio show, Ricky Gervais Is Deadly Sirius. Bianna Golodryga discusses CBS This Morning and recent politics. Flynn McGarry steps into the kitchen with Stephen.
643	November 15, 2018	Ben Stiller, Jemele Hill	Jorja Smith
Real News Tonight. Stephen Colbert: Level 10 Baby Master. Ben Stiller discusses Escape at Dannemora. Jemele Hill discusses Shut Up and Dribble and recent politics. Jorja Smith performs "Don't Watch Me Cry" from her album Lost & Found.
644	November 16, 2018	Timothée Chalamet	Graham Kay
Stephen sits down with Supreme Court Justice Sonia Sotomayor at the Library of Congress. Small Calls with Sonia Sotomayor. Timothée Chalamet discusses Beautiful Boy. Graham Kay gives a stand-up performance. Late Show Presents: best moments of the week, including segments with Ben Stiller, Ricky Gervais and Bianna Golodryga.
645	November 19, 2018	Millie Bobby Brown, Anthony Salvanto	Josh Groban
Stephen Colbert's interview of Chris Wallace's interview of President Trump. A cameo appearance by Laura Benanti as Melania Trump. Millie Bobby Brown discusses World Children's Day and her work as the youngest goodwill ambassador for UNICEF. Anthony Salvanto discusses recent politics and his new book, Where Did You Get This Number? Josh Groban performs Billy Joel's "She's Always a Woman" from his album Bridges. Late Show Presents: Rehearsal Rewind.
646	November 20, 2018	Michael Douglas, Senator Ben Sasse	N/A
Fox News weighs in Hillary Clinton's and Ivanka Trump's email scandals. Michael Douglas discusses his career, including his beginnings at CBS, and The Kominsky Method. Senator Ben Sasse discusses recent politics and his new book, Them: Why We Hate Each Other and How to Heal.
647	November 21, 2018	Connie Britton, George R. R. Martin, José Andrés	N/A
CBS Sports Presents: Black Friday Bowl. Weird Sex News. Stephen Colbert's Midnight Confessions. Connie Britton discusses Dirty John. George R. R. Martin discusses Game of Thrones and his new book, Fire & Blood. Chef José Andrés steps into the kitchen with Stephen and discusses his new book, We Fed an Island.
648	November 26, 2018	Stephen and Jon's Cartoon Thanks-travaganza	N/A
Special Thanksgiving episode featuring cartoon versions of Stephen and Jon Batiste as hosts. America: Epic Fall, featuring the best monologues. Stephen answers never-before-seen audience questions. Stephen goes outside, visiting Capitol Hill, Ringling Bros. and Barnum & Bailey Circus, Wrigley Field, Central New Jersey, the Met's "Heavenly Bodies" exhibit and the NASA, among others. Stephen's terrible turkey tips, visiting the Butterball headquarters. Stephen Colbert's Millennial Tutorial: Pay Phone Edition (segment rebroadcast from August 15 episode).
649	November 27, 2018	The Late Show with Stephen Colbert: Stephen Colbert Edition	N/A
Special episode with Stephen on the guest seat, being interviewed by Jon Stewart, Neil deGrasse Tyson, Jake Tapper, Kerry Washington and Charlamagne Tha God.
650	November 28, 2018	Eric McCormack, David Alan Grier	Sara Bareilles
Eric McCormack discusses Travelers. David Alan Grier discusses The Cool Kids. Sara Bareilles performs her new single, "Armor". Late Show Presents: Rehearsal Rewind.
651	November 29, 2018	Garth Brooks, Tim Meadows	N/A
Shut Your Trap! Late Show Presents: Meanwhile. Garth Brooks discusses his concert special, Garth: Live at Notre Dame. Tim Meadows discusses No Activity.
652	November 30, 2018	Michelle Obama	Common
Michelle Obama discusses her tenure as First Lady of the United States and her new book, Becoming. Common performs a medley of "The Day Women Took Over", from his album Black America Again, and "Glory", from the film Selma.

=== December ===
No.	Original release date	Guest(s)	Musical/entertainment guest(s)
653	December 3, 2018	Catherine Zeta-Jones, Lucas Hedges	Nathaniel Rateliff and the Night Sweats
Stephen acknowledges the passing of George H. W. Bush. Stephen Colbert's Happy Endings. Catherine Zeta-Jones discusses Queen America. Lucas Hedges discusses Ben Is Back and The Waverly Gallery. Nathaniel Rateliff and the Night Sweats perform "Hey Mama" from their album Tearing at the Seams.
654	December 4, 2018	Julia Roberts, Patrick Wilson	N/A
The Adventures of Tariff Man. Late Show Presents: Meanwhile. Julia Roberts discusses Ben Is Back. Patrick Wilson discusses Aquaman.
655	December 5, 2018	Jeff Daniels, Emily Mortimer	N/A
Hallmark Cards: The Robert Mueller Holiday Card Collection. Jeff Daniels discusses To Kill a Mockingbird. Emily Mortimer discusses Mary Poppins Returns. Late Show's Dear Famous People (cameo appearances by Ellie Kemper, Billy Eichner, Scott Bakula, Sarah Silverman and Phil McGraw). Late Show Presents: Rehearsal Rewind.
656	December 6, 2018	Senator Bernie Sanders, Chris Gethard	N/A
Senator Bernie Sanders discusses recent politics and his new book, Where We Go From Here: Two Years in the Resistance. Chris Gethard discusses his new book, Lose Well. Late Show Presents: Audience Questions.
657	December 7, 2018	Kathy Griffin	Emma Willmann
I Didn't See That Coming. The Big Furry Hat: Happy Holidays Edition. Kathy Griffin discusses her return to acting and comedy following her controversial Donald Trump depiction. Emma Willmann gives a stand-up performance. Late Show Presents: best moments of the week, including segments with Senator Bernie Sanders, Catherine Zeta-Jones, Emily Mortimer and Julia Roberts. Late Show Presents: Rehearsal Rewind.
658	December 10, 2018	Bryan Cranston, Doris Kearns Goodwin	N/A
Bryan Cranston discusses Network. Doris Kearns Goodwin discusses her new book, Leadership: In Turbulent Times. Late Show Presents: Rehearsal Rewind.
659	December 11, 2018	Whoopi Goldberg, Adam Pally	Jungle
Rescue Dog Rescue with Whoopi Goldberg. Whoopi Goldberg discusses her new line of Christmas sweaters. Adam Pally discusses Champaign ILL. Jungle performs "Smile" from their album For Ever.
660	December 12, 2018	Leslie Mann, Brandon Micheal Hall	Lil Wayne
First Drafts: Christmas Cards. Leslie Mann discusses Welcome to Marwen. Brandon Micheal Hall discusses God Friended Me. Lil Wayne performs "Don't Cry" from his album Tha Carter V. Late Show Presents: Rehearsal Rewind.
661	December 13, 2018	Diane Kruger, Joaquín & Julian Castro, Ira Madison III	N/A
Late Show Presents: Meanwhile. Diane Kruger discusses Welcome to Marwen. Joaquín & Julian Castro discuss recent politics and Julian's new book, An Unlikely Journey: Waking Up from My American Dream; Julian also announces his intention to run for President of the United States. Ira Madison III discusses his podcast, Keep It!. Late Show Presents: Rehearsal Rewind.
662	December 14, 2018	Tony Shalhoub	Joe Wong
Late Show Presents: Kids Pitch: Santa Fight: Saving the Holiday from Atnas (with appearances by Bryan Cranston, Laura Linney, John Oliver, Rachel Dratch and Nick Kroll). Tony Shalhoub discusses The Marvelous Mrs. Maisel. Joe Wong gives a stand-up performance. Late Show Presents: best moments of the week, including a segment with Joaquín and Julian Castro.
663	December 17, 2018	Sandra Bullock, Barry Jenkins	N/A
Sandra Bullock discusses Bird Box. Bullock or Bollocks? Barry Jenkins discusses If Beale Street Could Talk. Late Show Presents: Rehearsal Rewind.
664	December 18, 2018	Emily Blunt, Representative Adam Schiff	St. Paul and The Broken Bones
Late Show Presents: Meanwhile. Emily Blunt discusses Mary Poppins Returns. Blunt Emily Blunt. Representative Adam Schiff discusses recent politics. St. Paul and The Broken Bones perform "Zat You Santa Claus" from their album Young Sick Camellia.
665	December 19, 2018	Steve Carell, KiKi Layne	N/A
Steve Carell discusses Welcome to Marwen and Vice. KiKi Layne discusses If Beale Street Could Talk. Late Show Presents: Rehearsal Rewind.
666	December 20, 2018	John C. Reilly, Senator Jeff Flake	N/A
A Very Special Counsel Christmas. John C. Reilly discusses Stan & Ollie. Senator Jeff Flake discusses recent politics. Stephen Colbert's Ultimate Christmas Sweater. Late Show Presents: Rehearsal Rewind.
667	December 21, 2018	Jon Stewart	Jon Batiste & Stay Human
Late Show's Advent Calendar for Adults. Anxiety Baking. A Christmas Message from the White House (a cameo appearance by Laura Benanti as Melania Trump). Stephen is interviewed by Jon Stewart (segment rebroadcast from November 27 episode). Jon Batiste & Stay Human perform "Auld Lang Syne".
