= List of The Late Show with Stephen Colbert episodes (2019) =

- No. of episodes: 187

Release
- Original network: CBS
- Original release: January 7 – December 19, 2019

Season chronology
- ← Previous; 2018 episodes Next → 2020 episodes

This is the list of The Late Show with Stephen Colbert episodes that aired in 2019.

== 2019 ==
=== January ===
No.	Original release date	Guest(s)	Musical/entertainment guest(s)
668	January 7, 2019	Ethan Hawke, Jon Glaser	Taylor Bennett
Yogi Bear in: Government Shutdown. Ethan Hawke discusses True West and First Reformed. Jon Glaser discusses Jon Glaser Loves Gear. Taylor Bennett performs "Streaming Services".
669	January 8, 2019	Keegan-Michael Key, Josh Hutcherson	N/A
Bird Box: Part 2. Keegan-Michael Key discusses Friends from College. Josh Hutcherson discusses Future Man. Late Show Presents: Rehearsal Rewind.
670	January 9, 2019	Kevin Hart, Nicole Byer	N/A
Kevin Hart confirms he is not hosting the 91st Academy Awards and discusses The Upside. Nicole Byer discusses Comedians of the World. Late Show Presents: Rehearsal Rewind.
671	January 10, 2019	Senator Kamala Harris, Bradley Whitford	Gary Clark Jr.
Chopper Talk. Senator Kamala Harris discusses her new books, The Truths We Hold: An American Journey and Superheroes Are Everywhere. Bradley Whitford discusses Valley of the Boom. Gary Clark Jr. performs "This Land" from his album of the same name.
672	January 11, 2019	Curtis "50 Cent" Jackson, Jamie Oliver	N/A
Sunny Side Up with Weatherwoman Tammy Flowers. Late Show Presents: Meanwhile. Meanwhile Presents: Flight Attention. 50 Cent discusses his new champagne, "Le Chemin du Roi". 50's Two Cents. Jamie Oliver steps into the kitchen with Stephen and discusses his new book, 5 Ingredients.
673	January 14, 2019	James McAvoy, Sonequa Martin-Green	Kane Brown
Chopper Talk. James McAvoy discusses Glass and Watership Down. Sonequa Martin-Green discusses Star Trek: Discovery. Kane Brown performs "Homesick" from his album Experiment.
674	January 15, 2019	Senator Kirsten Gillibrand, M. Night Shyamalan	N/A
TrumpNATO. Late Show Presents: Meanwhile. Senator Kirsten Gillibrand discusses recent politics and announces her intention to run for President of the United States. M. Night Shyamalan discusses Glass. Late Show Presents: Celebrity Spokesmania (special appearance by Chloë Grace Moretz). Late Show Presents: Rehearsal Rewind.
675	January 16, 2019	Jake Gyllenhaal, Pete Holmes	N/A
Mary Poppins Post-Brexit. Jake Gyllenhaal discusses Spider-Man: Far From Home, Velvet Buzzsaw and Sea Wall/A Life. Pete Holmes discusses Crashing. Late Show Presents: Rehearsal Rewind.
676	January 17, 2019	Sarah Paulson, Killer Mike	Future
Stephen Colbert's Cyborgasm. Sarah Paulson discusses Glass and Bird Box. Killer Mike discusses Trigger Warning. Future performs "Crushed Up" from his album The Wizrd.
677	January 18, 2019	William H. Macy, Rebecca Traister	N/A
A Word from Art. Doin' It Donkey Style. Late Show's Uninformed Correspondent: Comic-Con Edition. William H. Macy discusses Shameless. Rebecca Traister discusses her new book, Good and Mad. Late Show Presents: Audience Questions.
678	January 21, 2019	Representative Alexandria Ocasio-Cortez, Method Man	N/A
Doin' It Donkey Style. Representative Alexandria Ocasio-Cortez discusses recent politics. Method Man discusses Drop the Mic.
679	January 22, 2019	Drew Barrymore, Mo Rocca	Maggie Rogers
Rudy Giuliani's Gravestone: The Rough Drafts. Late Show Presents: Meanwhile. Drew Barrymore discusses The World's Best and the 20th anniversary of Never Been Kissed. Mo Rocca discusses Mobituaries. Maggie Rogers performs "Burning" from her album Heard It in a Past Life, with Jon Batiste providing musical accompaniment. Late Show Presents: Rehearsal Rewind.
680	January 23, 2019	Matthew McConaughey	Better Oblivion Community Center
Frank's Banquet Hall. Big Questions with Even Bigger Stars (with Matthew McConaughey). Matthew McConaughey discusses Serenity. Better Oblivion Community Center performs "Dylan Thomas".
681	January 24, 2019	Michael Moore, Ken Marino	Dermot Kennedy
Stephen Colbert's Midnight Confessions. Michael Moore discusses Fahrenheit 11/9 and recent politics. Ken Marino discusses The Other Two (special appearance by Justin Theroux). Dermot Kennedy performs "Power Over Me". Late Show Presents: Rehearsal Rewind.
682	January 25, 2019	John Goodman	Samantha Ruddy
Late Show Presents: The Greatest Folds in History. Late Show Presents: Meanwhile. John Goodman discusses Black Earth Rising. Late Show Backstage Pass (special appearance by Tony Shalhoub). Samantha Ruddy gives a stand-up performance.
683	January 28, 2019	Cliff Sims, Paul Simon	Paul Simon
MUELLER. Cliff Sims discusses his new book, Team of Vipers. Paul Simon discusses his new album, In the Blue Light. Paul Simon performs "Rene and Georgette Magritte with Their Dog after the War".
684	January 29, 2019	Chris Christie, Yvette Nicole Brown	N/A
Late Show Presents: The Other Things Written on John Bolton's Notepad. Late Show Presents: Meanwhile. Chris Christie discusses recent politics and his new book, Let Me Finish. Yvette Nicole Brown discusses recent politics and Weird City.
685	January 30, 2019	John Heilemann, Mark McKinnon, Alex Wagner, Max Greenfield	N/A
Russian Roundup. A Late Show Super Bowl Ad Exclusive. John Heilemann, Mark McKinnon and Alex Wagner discuss recent politics and The Circus. Max Greenfield discusses The Neighborhood and Veronica Mars. Late Show Presents: Rehearsal Rewind.
686	January 31, 2019	Elliot Page, Radhika Jones	Django Gold
Late Show's Just One Question: Super Bowl Edition. Elliot Page discusses recent politics and The Umbrella Academy. Radhika Jones discusses her work as editor-in-chief of Vanity Fair. Django Gold gives a stand-up performance.

=== February ===
No.	Original release date	Guest(s)	Musical/entertainment guest(s)
687	February 3, 2019	Conan O'Brien, Steve Carell	James Taylor
Special episode airing after Super Bowl LIII. Stephen throws a Super Bowl party (special appearances by Patrick Stewart, Gritty, Chuck Schumer and Nancy Pelosi). EA Sports puts Stephen into Madden NFL 19. Conan O'Brien discusses Conan. Late Show Personal Space with Steve Carell (new footage from December 19, 2018 episode). James Taylor performs "Your Smiling Face".
688	February 4, 2019	Taraji P. Henson, Matt Walsh, Marie Kondo	N/A
Stephen Colbert's interview of Margaret Brennan's interview of President Trump. Taraji P. Henson discusses What Men Want. Matt Walsh discusses Veep and Under the Eiffel Tower. Marie Kondo discusses Tidying Up. Late Show Presents: Rehearsal Rewind.
689	February 5, 2019	Norah O'Donnell, John Dickerson, Gayle King, Bianna Golodryga, Spike Lee	N/A
Special live episode following the State of the Union Address. Norah O'Donnell, John Dickerson, Gayle King and Bianna Golodryga discuss the State of the Union Address and CBS This Morning. Spike Lee discusses BlacKkKlansman.
690	February 6, 2019	Steve Buscemi, Bret Baier	Sasha Sloan
Late Show Presents: The Real State of the Union. Late Show Presents: Meanwhile. Steve Buscemi discusses Miracle Workers. Bret Baier discusses recent politics and Special Report. Sasha Sloan performs "Older" from her album Loser.
691	February 7, 2019	Chris Pratt, Meghan McCain	Beirut
Stephen Colbert's Midnight Confessions. Chris Pratt discusses The Lego Movie 2: The Second Part. Meghan McCain discusses recent politics and The View. Beirut performs "Gallipoli" from their album of the same name.
692	February 8, 2019	Glenn Close	Byron Bowers
Doin' It Donkey Style. Late Show Presents: Meanwhile. Glenn Close discusses The Wife. Up Close with Glenn Close. Byron Bowers gives a stand-up performance. Late Show Presents: Rehearsal Rewind.
693	February 11, 2019	John Oliver	Blackpink
Stephen Colbert's interview of Gayle King's interview of Ralph Northam. Go Fund Yourself. John Oliver discusses recent politics and Last Week Tonight. Blackpink performs "Ddu-Du Ddu-Du" from their album Square Up (EP).
694	February 12, 2019	Regina King, Bill & Melinda Gates, Jena Friedman	N/A
Late Show Presents: Meanwhile. Regina King discusses If Beale Street Could Talk. Bill & Melinda Gates discuss their foundation's work. Jena Friedman discusses Soft Focus. Late Show Presents: Rehearsal Rewind.
695	February 13, 2019	Trevor Noah, Natasha Lyonne	N/A
Russian Roundup. Trevor Noah discusses The Daily Show, recent politics and his new book, Born a Crime. Natasha Lyonne discusses Russian Doll.
696	February 14, 2019	Bradley Cooper, Pete Buttigieg	N/A
First Drafts: Valentine's Day Cards. Bradley Cooper discusses A Star Is Born. Pete Buttigieg discusses his 2020 presidential campaign, recent politics and his new book, Shortest Way Home.
697	February 15, 2019	Jeff Goldblum, Jacques Torres	The Marcus King Band
The Jon Batiste St. Valentine's Black History Day, Month Card Collection. Doin' It Donkey Style. Late Show Presents: Meanwhile. Jeff Goldblum discusses his new album, The Capitol Studios Sessions. Jacques Torres steps into the kitchen with Stephen. The Marcus King Band performs "Goodbye Carolina" from their album Carolina Confessions.
698	February 18, 2019	Jake Tapper, Amy Sedaris	The Claypool Lennon Delirium
Crisis on the Southern Border: Press 1 for English, Press 2 for Murder. Jake Tapper discusses The Lead and recent politics. Amy Sedaris discusses At Home. The Claypool Lennon Delirium performs "Blood and Rockets" from their album South of Reality. Late Show Presents: Rehearsal Rewind.
699	February 19, 2019	Andrew McCabe, Dan Levy	Sigrid
Invasion of the Presidential Candidates. Crisis on the Southern Border: Press 1 for English, Press 2 for Murder. Andrew McCabe discusses recent politics and his new book, The Threat. Dan Levy discusses Schitt's Creek. Sigrid performs "Don't Feel Like Crying" from her album Sucker Punch.
700	February 20, 2019	Reba McEntire, Margaret Brennan	N/A
Late Show Presents: Meanwhile. Reba McEntire discusses the upcoming Academy of Country Music Awards and her new album, Stronger Than the Truth. Margaret Brennan discusses Face the Nation and recent politics. Late Show Presents: Celebrity Spokesmania (special appearance by Alexander Skarsgård).
701	February 21, 2019	Annette Bening, Ana Navarro	Ben Platt
Annette Bening discusses Captain Marvel and All My Sons. Ana Navarro discusses recent politics and The View. Ben Platt performs "Bad Habit" from his album Sing to Me Instead. Late Show Presents: Rehearsal Rewind.
702	February 22, 2019	Don Cheadle, Colin Quinn	N/A
Trump's Climate Committee. Late Show Presents: Meanwhile. Don Cheadle discusses Black Monday. Colin Quinn discusses Red State Blue State. Late Show Presents: best moments of the week, including a segment with Andrew McCabe.

=== March ===
No.	Original release date	Guest(s)	Musical/entertainment guest(s)
703	March 4, 2019	Julianne Moore, Thomas Lennon	Bebe Rexha
Doin' It Donkey Style. Julianne Moore discusses Gloria Bell and After the Wedding. Thomas Lennon discusses his new book, Ronan Boyle and the Bridge of Riddles. Bebe Rexha performs "Last Hurrah". Late Show Presents: Rehearsal Rewind.
704	March 5, 2019	Kit Harington, Amber Tamblyn	Hozier
Shame of Thrones. NOT Doin' It Donkey Style. Late Show Presents: Meanwhile. Kit Harington discusses Game of Thrones. Amber Tamblyn discusses her new book, Era of Ignition. Hozier performs "Almost (Sweet Music)" from his album Wasteland, Baby! Late Show Presents: Rehearsal Rewind.
705	March 6, 2019	Willie Geist, Phoebe Waller-Bridge	Dwayne Perkins
Stephen acknowledges Alex Trebek's pancreatic cancer announcement. Willie Geist discusses Morning Joe and Weekend Today. Phoebe Waller-Bridge discusses Fleabag. Dwayne Perkins gives a stand-up performance.
706	March 7, 2019	Gayle King, Pamela Adlon	Mumford & Sons
Gayle King discusses CBS This Morning and her interview with R. Kelly. Pamela Adlon discusses Better Things. Mumford & Sons perform "Beloved" from their album Delta.
707	March 8, 2019	Senator Cory Booker, Matt Ingebretson & Jake Weisman	N/A
Stephen Colbert's A Salute to Time. Late Show Presents: Meanwhile. Senator Cory Booker discusses his 2020 presidential campaign. Matt Ingebretson & Jake Weisman discuss Corporate.
708	March 11, 2019	Damian Lewis, Representative Tulsi Gabbard	Ellie Goulding
Applegate (Not Christina). 8 Consecutive Massage Parlor Jokes. Damian Lewis discusses Billions. Representative Tulsi Gabbard discusses her 2020 presidential campaign and recent politics. Ellie Goulding performs "Close to Me", with Jon Batiste and Stay Human providing musical accompaniment.
709	March 12, 2019	John Turturro, Andrew Rannells	Robyn
Stephen acknowledges the Ethiopian Airlines Flight 302 air disaster. Late Show Presents: Meanwhile. John Turturro discusses Gloria Bell. Andrew Rannells discusses his new book, Too Much Is Not Enough: A Memoir of Fumbling Toward Adulthood, and Black Monday. Robyn performs "Ever Again" from her album Honey. Late Show Presents: Rehearsal Rewind.
710	March 13, 2019	Patricia Arquette, Ian McShane	Strand of Oaks featuring Jason Isbell & Amanda Shires
Patricia Arquette discusses The Act. Ian McShane discusses American Gods. Strand of Oaks perform "Ruby" from their album Eraserland, featuring Jason Isbell, Amanda Shires and members of My Morning Jacket.
711	March 14, 2019	Christine Baranski, Representative Adam Kinzinger	N/A
Now That's What I Call An Alibi! Crisis on the Southern Border: Press 1 for English, Press 2 for Muerto (National Emergency Emergency Edition). Doin' It Donkey Style. Late Show Presents: Meanwhile. Christine Baranski discusses The Good Fight. Representative Adam Kinzinger discusses recent politics.
712	March 15, 2019	Donnie Wahlberg, Heidi Schreck	N/A
Ted Rye, the Science Funding Cut Guy. Cameo appearances by Laura Benanti and Christine Baranski as Melania Trump. Dialogue with a Demon: The Dick Nighttime Murders. Donnie Wahlberg discusses Blue Bloods and Very Scary People. Heidi Schreck discusses her new Broadway show, What the Constitution Means to Me.
713	March 18, 2019	Lupita Nyong'o, Vicky Ward	Karen O & Danger Mouse
Stephen acknowledges the mosque shootings at Christchurch, New Zealand. Doin' It Donkey Style. Lupita Nyong'o discusses Us. Vicky Ward discusses her new book, Kushner, Inc. Karen O & Danger Mouse perform "Woman" from their collaborative album Lux Prima.
714	March 19, 2019	Chris Hayes, Nico Parker	N/A
Late Show Presents: Meanwhile. Chris Hayes discusses All In and recent politics. Nico Parker discusses Dumbo.
715	March 20, 2019	Paul Giamatti, Senator Doug Jones	Aparna Nancherla
Doin' It Donkey Style. Late Show's Just One Question, with Representative Alexandria Ocasio-Cortez (cameo appearance by Molly Ringwald). Paul Giamatti discusses Billions and Lodge 49. Senator Doug Jones discusses recent politics and his new book, Bending Toward Justice. Aparna Nancherla gives a stand-up performance.
716	March 25, 2019	Senator Elizabeth Warren, Tony Hale	N/A
The Late Show's production of Mueller. Oh... Alright Then: Day One. Senator Elizabeth Warren discusses her 2020 presidential campaign and recent politics. Tony Hale discusses Veep and Toy Story 4.
717	March 26, 2019	Keri Russell, Martha Stewart	N/A
Barrnotes. Keri Russell discusses Star Wars: The Rise of Skywalker and Burn This. Martha Stewart steps into the kitchen with Stephen and discusses her new book, Grilling. Late Show Presents: Rehearsal Rewind.
718	March 27, 2019	Charles Barkley, Tig Notaro	N/A
Donald Trump: MANimal. Late Show Presents: Meanwhile. Charles Barkley discusses March Madness at the NCAA. Tig Notaro discusses Star Trek: Discovery.

=== April ===
No.	Original release date	Guest(s)	Musical/entertainment guest(s)
719	April 1, 2019	Nathan Lane, The Cast of Queer Eye	N/A
Eddie Barbash, former member of Stay Human, sits in with the band and provides musical accompaniment. Stephen Colbert Wet Whispers You to Serenity. Nathan Lane discusses Gary: A Sequel to Titus Andronicus. The Cast of Queer Eye discusses the show and plays "Fab or Drab?"
720	April 2, 2019	Emilia Clarke, Henry Winkler	H.E.R.
Mad Guac: The Avocado Warrior. Late Show Presents: Meanwhile. Emilia Clarke discusses Game of Thrones. Henry Winkler discusses Barry and his collection of Hank Zipzer books. H.E.R. performs "Hard Place".
721	April 3, 2019	John Lithgow, Stacey Abrams	Kevin Garrett
WIND: It Blows. John Lithgow discusses Hillary and Clinton. Stacey Abrams discusses her new book, Lead from the Outside: How to Build Your Future and Make Real Change, and her writing career under the pen name Selena Montgomery. Kevin Garrett performs "It Don't Bother Me At All" from his album Hoax.
722	April 4, 2019	Sandra Oh, Zachary Levi	Nina Nesbitt
Late Show Presents: Meanwhile. Sandra Oh discusses Killing Eve. Zachary Levi discusses Shazam! Nina Nesbitt performs "The Best You Had" from her album The Sun Will Come Up, the Seasons Will Change.
723	April 5, 2019	Hank Azaria, Henry Louis Gates Jr.	N/A
"Barr She Blows" (special appearance by Amy Rutberg). Celebrity Tax Tips (special appearance by Jeff Goldblum). Rescue Dog Rescue – Game of Thrones Edition: A Song of Cuddles and Snuggles, with Emilia Clarke (new footage from April 2 episode). Hank Azaria discusses The Simpsons and Brockmire. Henry Louis Gates Jr. discusses Reconstruction: America After the Civil War and his new book, Stony the Road: Reconstruction, White Supremacy, and the Rise of Jim Crow.
724	April 8, 2019	Zach Galifianakis, Representative Eric Swalwell	Ellie Goulding
Hallmark Cards: The Kirstjen Nielsen Farewell Card Collection. Late Show's Just One Question: March Madness Edition. Zach Galifianakis discusses Missing Link. Representative Eric Swalwell discusses recent politics and announces his intention to run for President of the United States. Ellie Goulding performs "Flux".
725	April 9, 2019	Michelle Williams, Emily Bazelon	N/A
Darius Lighthouse's Acting Secretary School of Acting. Late Show Presents: Meanwhile. A special appearance by Oscar the Grouch. Michelle Williams discusses Fosse/Verdon. Emily Bazelon discusses her new book, Charged.
726	April 10, 2019	Anderson Cooper, Ruth Wilson, Representative Ilhan Omar	N/A
Chopper Talk. Anderson Cooper discusses 60 Minutes and recent politics. Ruth Wilson discusses Mrs Wilson and King Lear on Broadway. Representative Ilhan Omar discusses recent politics.
727	April 15, 2019	Molly Shannon, Gary Cole	Paul Simon
Flipped Interview with Trevor Noah (new footage from February 13 episode). Late Show Presents: Meanwhile (segment rebroadcast from April 4 episode). Molly Shannon discusses Wild Nights with Emily. Gary Cole discusses Veep. Paul Simon performs "That Was Your Mother" from his 1986 album Graceland, with Stephen, Jon Batiste & Stay Human providing musical accompaniment.
728	April 16, 2019	Laurie Metcalf, Ramy Youssef	N/A
Stephen acknowledges the fire at the Notre-Dame Cathedral in Paris. Late Show Street Show: London Edition. Late Show Presents: Meanwhile. Laurie Metcalf discusses Hillary and Clinton. Ramy Youssef discusses Ramy.
729	April 17, 2019	Anna Palmer & Jake Sherman	The Lumineers
The Mueller Report Audiobook (special appearance by Gilbert Gottfried). An interview with Stephen Miller (special appearance by Peter Grosz). Late Show's Just One Question: Avengers Edition (special appearances by Scarlett Johansson, Don Cheadle, Chris Hemsworth, Brie Larson, Jeremy Renner, Chris Evans and Mark Ruffalo). Anna Palmer & Jake Sherman discuss recent politics and their new book, The Hill to Die On. The Lumineers perform "Gloria" from their album III. Late Show Presents: Rehearsal Rewind.
730	April 18, 2019	Neal Katyal, Samantha Bee	Cage the Elephant
Neal Katyal discusses the release of the Mueller Report and recent politics. Samantha Bee discusses Full Frontal. Cage The Elephant performs "Ready to Let Go" from their album Social Cues.
731	April 19, 2019	Robert De Niro, Beth Behrs, Retta	N/A
Robert De Niro discusses the upcoming Tribeca Film Festival and The Irishman. "Analyze These" with Robert De Niro. Beth Behrs discusses The Neighborhood. Stephen pays tribute to his longtime cameraman John Meiklejohn (1937–2019). Retta discusses Good Girls.
732	April 29, 2019	Seth Rogen, Jessica Yellin	N/A
Doin' It Donkey Style. Donald Trump's 10,000 Lies. Stephen watches Avengers: Endgame (kind of). Late Show No Spoiler Zone: Avengers Endgame of Thrones Edition. Seth Rogen discusses Long Shot and The Lion King. Jessica Yellin discusses her new book, Savage News.
733	April 30, 2019	Christina Applegate, Van Jones	N/A
Late Show Presents: Meanwhile. Late Show Presents: Mean-Whale. Late Show Presents: No! Don't Put That In There! Christina Applegate discusses Dead to Me. Van Jones discusses The Redemption Project.

=== May ===
No.	Original release date	Guest(s)	Musical/entertainment guest(s)
734	May 1, 2019	Mariska Hargitay, Thomas Middleditch	Hootie & the Blowfish
Mariska Hargitay discusses Law & Order: Special Victims Unit. Thomas Middleditch discusses Godzilla: King of the Monsters. Hootie & the Blowfish perform "Hold My Hand" from their 1994 album Cracked Rear View. Late Show Presents: Rehearsal Rewind.
735	May 2, 2019	Chris Cuomo, Nicholas Hoult & Lily Collins	James Taylor
Late Show Presents: Meanwhile. Chris Cuomo discusses Cuomo Prime Time and does push-ups with Stephen. Nicholas Hoult & Lily Collins discuss Tolkien. James Taylor performs "Carolina in My Mind" from his 1968 self-titled debut album.
736	May 3, 2019	Craig Ferguson, Ronda Rousey, Bear Grylls	N/A
Sixteen Scandals. Stephen presents Covettoosh, the newest website from his own lifestyle brand, Covetton House. Craig Ferguson discusses his new book, Riding the Elephant. Ronda Rousey discusses Mortal Kombat 11. Bear Grylls discusses Hostile Planet.
737	May 6, 2019	Common, Rachel Dratch	Maren Morris
Doin' It Donkey Style. Common discusses his new book, Let Love Have the Last Word. Common Disclaimers. Rachel Dratch discusses Wine Country. Maren Morris performs "A Song for Everything" from her album Girl.
738	May 7, 2019	Anne Hathaway, Ari Melber	N/A
Doin' It Donkey Style. Benny Golson sits in with the band and provides musical accompaniment. Late Show Presents: Meanwhile. Anne Hathaway discusses The Hustle (special appearance by RuPaul). Ari Melber discusses The Beat and recent politics.
739	May 8, 2019	Bryan Cranston, RuPaul	Bonnie Raitt
McConnell Squad (special appearance by Scott Adsit). Late Show Presents: Meanwhile. Late Show Presents: Meanwhile: Mean-Whale: Well-Meaning Whale. Bryan Cranston discusses Sneaky Pete and Network. RuPaul discusses Met Gala outfits and RuPaul's Drag Race. Bonnie Raitt performs "Angel from Montgomery" from her 1974 album Streetlights.
740	May 9, 2019	The Cast of Veep	N/A
Obstruction Junction: Our Democracy Doesn't Function. Late Show Presents: Meanwhile. The Cast of Veep (Julia Louis-Dreyfus, Anna Chlumsky, Tony Hale, Timothy Simons, Matt Walsh, Kevin Dunn, Gary Cole, Sam Richardson, Sarah Sutherland and Clea DuVall) discusses the show and answers questions from social media.
741	May 10, 2019	Keanu Reeves, Santino Fontana	N/A
Obstruction Junction: Our Democracy Doesn't Function. Stephen & Bryan's Times Square Adventure (new footage from May 8 episode; Bryan Cranston treats the audience to a play of Network). Keanu Reeves discusses John Wick: Chapter 3 – Parabellum and Bill & Ted Face the Music. Santino Fontana discusses Tootsie.
742	May 13, 2019	Bill Hader	James Bay
Air Bud: International Ambarkador. "Trade War, Huh. What Is It Good For? I Am Really Asking, Say It Again Y'All!" Doin' It Donkey Style. Late Show Presents: Meanwhile. Bill Hader discusses Barry and his early work in Saturday Night Live. The Late Show Presents: Maybe Coming Soon, with Bill Hader. James Bay performs "Bad" from his EP Oh My Messy Mind.
743	May 14, 2019	Gayle King, Anthony Mason & Tony Dokoupil; Pete Holmes	The National
Dale's Walrus Warehouse. "Trade War, Huh. What Is It Good For? I Am Really Asking, Say It Again Y'All!" Gayle King, Anthony Mason & Tony Dokoupil discuss CBS This Morning and the 2020 presidential run. Pete Holmes discusses his new book, Comedy Sex God. The National performs "You Had Your Soul With You" from their album I Am Easy to Find.
744	May 15, 2019	Jon Favreau, Jon Lovett & Tommy Vietor, BTS	BTS
"Trade War, Huh. What Is It Good For? I Am Really Asking, Say It Again Y'All!" Jon Favreau, Jon Lovett & Tommy Vietor discuss recent politics and Pod Save America. The members of BTS have a small interview with Stephen and perform "Boy with Luv" from their EP Map of the Soul: Persona.
745	May 16, 2019	The Cast of The Big Bang Theory	Barenaked Ladies
Late Show Presents: Nursery Rhymes: Farmer in the Dell. Doin' It Donkey Style. Late Show Presents: Meanwhile. The Cast of The Big Bang Theory (Johnny Galecki, Jim Parsons, Kaley Cuoco, Simon Helberg, Kunal Nayyar, Mayim Bialik and Melissa Rauch) discusses the series finale and answers questions from social media. Barenaked Ladies performs "Big Bang Theory Theme".
746	May 17, 2019	Olivia Wilde, Scott Pelley	BTS
Late Show Presents: Traditional Space Shanties. Mooooon Newwwws. Jon Batiste's Game of Thrones song. Olivia Wilde discusses Booksmart. Scott Pelley discusses CBS Evening News and his new book, Truth Worth Telling. BTS performs "Make It Right" from their EP Map of the Soul: Persona (new footage from May 15 episode).
747	May 20, 2019	Julianna Margulies, Admiral William McRaven	The Cast of The Prom
Late Show Presents: Meanwhile. Julianna Margulies discusses The Hot Zone. Admiral William McRaven discusses his career in the United States Navy and his new book, Sea Stories: My Life in Special Operations. The cast of The Prom performs "Unruly Heart".
748	May 21, 2019	Howard Stern	N/A
Obstruction Junction: Our Democracy Doesn't Function. Oh Snap!. Howard Stern discusses his work in America's Got Talent; his new book, Howard Stern Comes Again; and his relationship with Donald Trump.
749	May 22, 2019	Senator Kamala Harris, Kaitlyn Dever	N/A
Trump Words That Start With "I". Cory Wong, Tim Lefebvre and Camille Thurman sit in with the band and provide musical accompaniment. Late Show Presents: Meanwhile. Senator Kamala Harris discusses her 2020 presidential campaign and recent politics. Kaitlyn Dever discusses Booksmart.
750	May 23, 2019	Conan O'Brien, Jim Sciutto	The National
Stephen Colbert's Unseen Mysteries of the Hidden Secrets. Late Show Personal Space with Conan O'Brien (new footage from February 3 episode). Jim Sciutto discusses recent politics and his new book, The Shadow War: Inside Russia's and China's Secret Operations to Defeat America. The National performs "Rylan" from their album I Am Easy to Find (new footage from May 14 episode).

=== June ===
No.	Original release date	Guest(s)	Musical/entertainment guest(s)
751	June 3, 2019	Wanda Sykes, Vanessa Bayer	N/A
Why In The World Is Donald Trump? Wanda Sykes discusses Not Normal, her new stand-up special. Vanessa Bayer discusses her new book, How Do You Care for a Very Sick Bear? Late Show Presents: Rehearsal Rewind.
752	June 4, 2019	Emma Thompson, Adam Scott	Spiritualized
Late Show Presents: Meanwhile. Emma Thompson discusses Late Night. Adam Scott discusses Big Little Lies. Spiritualized performs "I'm Your Man" from their album And Nothing Hurt.
753	June 5, 2019	James Corden, Zoë Kravitz	Lewis Capaldi
Stephen Colbert's interview of Piers Morgan's interview of President Trump. Why in the World Is Donald Trump? Keep in Mind: Everyone's Fine! Jaron Lanier sits in with the band and provides musical accompaniment. James Corden discusses his upcoming hosting gig for the 73rd Tony Awards. Zoë Kravitz discusses Big Little Lies. Lewis Capaldi performs "Someone You Loved" from his album Divinely Uninspired to a Hellish Extent.
754	June 6, 2019	Mindy Kaling, Seth Green	N/A
The Trump Postcards from Europe. Stephen acknowledges D-Day's 75th anniversary with a 1944 letter from his uncle Andrew Edward Tuck, a World War II lieutenant. Late Show Presents: Meanwhile. Mindy Kaling discusses Late Night. Seth Green discusses Robot Chicken and Changeland. Late Show Presents: Rehearsal Rewind.
755	June 7, 2019	Elisabeth Moss, Matt Bomer	Steven Rogers
A PSA by the Trump administration. Stephen meets the biggest star in Broadway: King Kong. Elisabeth Moss discusses The Handmaid's Tale. Matt Bomer discusses Doom Patrol and Papi Chulo. Steven Rogers gives a stand-up performance.
756	June 10, 2019	Samuel L. Jackson, Ash Carter	N/A
Doin' It Donkey Style. Samuel L. Jackson discusses Shaft. Ash Carter discusses his tenure as President Barack Obama's Secretary of Defense and his new book, Inside the Five-Sided Box.
757	June 11, 2019	Tim McGraw & Jon Meacham, Tessa Thompson	Jessie Reyez featuring 6lack
Chopper Talk. Late Show Presents: Meanwhile. Tim McGraw & Jon Meacham discuss their new book, Songs of America. Tessa Thompson discusses Men in Black: International. Jessie Reyez performs "Imported", featuring 6lack. Late Show Presents: Rehearsal Rewind.
758	June 12, 2019	Beto O'Rourke, Billy Porter	N/A
Andrzej Duda Day. Beto O'Rourke discusses his 2020 presidential campaign and recent politics. Billy Porter discusses Pose. Late Show Presents: Rehearsal Rewind.
759	June 13, 2019	Kevin Bacon, Mark Ronson	Mark Ronson featuring Lykke Li
Late Show Presents: Meanwhile. Meanwhile Presents: Guess Which State This Happened In? Never Mind, It's Florida. Kevin Bacon discusses City on a Hill. Mark Ronson discusses the beginnings of his career and his new album, Late Night Feelings. Mark Ronson performs "Late Night Feelings", featuring Lykke Li.
760	June 14, 2019	Aubrey Plaza, Dan Abrams	N/A
Birch Sycamore: Tree Detective. First Drafts: Father's Day Cards. Aubrey Plaza discusses Child's Play. Community Calendar: Wilmington, Delaware with Aubrey Plaza. Dan Abrams discusses his new book, Theodore Roosevelt for the Defense.
761	June 17, 2019	Dax Shepard, Preet Bharara	Lukas Nelson & Promise of the Real
Jon Stewart responds to Mitch McConnell. Dax Shepard discusses Spin the Wheel. Preet Bharara discusses recent politics and his new book, Doing Justice. Lukas Nelson & Promise of the Real perform "Bad Case" from their album Turn Off the News (Build a Garden).
762	June 18, 2019	Chris Matthews, Jessie Buckley	Jessie Buckley
45 Fest. Chopper Talk. Late Show Presents: Meanwhile. Chris Matthews discusses recent politics and the upcoming Democratic Party debates. Jessie Buckley discusses Wild Rose and performs "Glasgow (No Place Like Home)".
763	June 19, 2019	Ice Cube, Tig Notaro	N/A
Ice Cube discusses the passing of director and friend John Singleton and the upcoming season of the Big3 basketball league. Tig Notaro discusses Under a Rock.
764	June 20, 2019	Russell Crowe	The Raconteurs
America At Whaaa? Doin' It Donkey Style. Real News Tonight investigates: the Orlando Trump Rally. Russell Crowe discusses The Loudest Voice. The Raconteurs perform "Help Me Stranger" from their album Help Us Stranger.
765	June 21, 2019	Naomi Watts, Lori Lightfoot	The Raconteurs
Darius Lighthouse's Acting Secretary School of Acting. Doin' It Donkey Style. Late Show Presents: Meanwhile. Naomi Watts discusses The Loudest Voice. Lori Lightfoot discusses her work as Chicago's new Mayor. The Raconteurs perform "Bored and Razed" from their album Help Us Stranger.
766	June 24, 2019	Tom Holland, Andrew Yang	Jenny Lewis
Stephen Colbert's interview of Chuck Todd's interview of President Trump. America At Whaaa? Rescue Dog Rescue – Superhero Edition: With Great Paw-er Comes Great Dane-sponsibility, with Tom Holland. Tom Holland discusses Spider-Man: Far From Home. Andrew Yang discusses his 2020 presidential campaign. Jenny Lewis performs "Wasted Youth" from her album On the Line.
767	June 25, 2019	Zendaya, Julian Edelman	N/A
America At Whaaa? Zendaya discusses Spider-Man: Far From Home and Euphoria. Julian Edelman discusses 100% Julian Edelman and his career with the New England Patriots. The Late Show gets a spin-off: Jazz Cowboy (special appearance by Samuel L. Jackson).
768	June 26, 2019	Alexandria Ocasio-Cortez	Incubus
Special live episode following the first part of the first official Democratic debate. Primarymon: Trading Card Game. The Dap-Kings sit in with the band and provide musical accompaniment. Representative Alexandria Ocasio-Cortez discusses the first part of the first official debate and recent politics. Late Show Presents: Meanwhile. Incubus performs "Drive" from their album Make Yourself.
769	June 27, 2019	Chris Christie, Carly Zakin & Danielle Weisberg	N/A
Special live episode following the second part of the first official Democratic debate. The Golden Candidates. The Dap-Kings sit in with the band and provide musical accompaniment. Late Show's The All-Governor Steve Bullock Debate. Chris Christie discusses the second part of the first official debate and his new book, Let Me Finish. Carly Zakin & Danielle Weisberg discuss the second part of the first official debate and their new book, How to Skimm Your Life.

=== July ===
No.	Original release date	Guest(s)	Musical/entertainment guest(s)
770	July 15, 2019	Ricky Gervais	X Ambassadors
Stephen's vacation pictures. Ricky Gervais discusses After Life and his weekly radio show, Ricky Gervais Is Deadly Sirius. X Ambassadors perform "Hold You Down" from their album Orion. Late Show Presents: Rehearsal Rewind.
771	July 16, 2019	Awkwafina, Donny Deutsch	The Mountain Goats
The Squad. Late Show Presents: Meanwhile. Awkwafina discusses The Farewell. Donny Deutsch discusses recent politics and Saturday Night Politics. The Mountain Goats perform "Sicilian Crest" from their album In League with Dragons.
772	July 17, 2019	Sofía Vergara, David Cross	Tove Lo
The Squad. Doin' It Donkey Style. Sofía Vergara discusses EBY, her line of underwear, and Bottom of the 9th. David Cross discusses his new comedy album, Oh, Come On. Tove Lo performs "Glad He's Gone" from her album Sunshine Kitty.
773	July 18, 2019	Norah O'Donnell, Topher Grace	Ahamed Weinberg
Wheel of Misfortune. The Squad. Late Show Presents: Meanwhile. Norah O'Donnell discusses CBS Evening News and recent politics. Topher Grace discusses Black Mirror and his new podcast, Minor Adventures. Ahamed Weinberg gives a stand-up performance.
774	July 19, 2019	John Oliver, Joe Namath	N/A
Doin' It Donkey Style. PonyPoints. John Oliver discusses The Lion King and recent politics. Joe Namath discusses his new book, All the Way.
775	July 22, 2019	Jake Gyllenhaal, Marianne Williamson	Daniel Simonsen
Stephen Colbert's interview of Major Garrett's interview of Vice President Mike Pence. The Squad. Valerie Simpson sits in with the band and provides musical accompaniment. Jake Gyllenhaal discusses Sea Wall/A Life and Spider-Man: Far From Home. Marianne Williamson discusses her 2020 presidential campaign and her new book, A Politics of Love. Daniel Simonsen gives a stand-up performance.
776	July 23, 2019	Julian Castro, Tony Hale	Nilüfer Yanya
The Squad. Late Show Presents: Meanwhile. Julian Castro discusses his 2020 presidential campaign and recent politics. Tony Hale discusses Veep. Nilüfer Yanya performs "In Your Head" from her album Miss Universe.
777	July 24, 2019	Chris Wallace, Jamie Bell	N/A
Valerie Simpson sits in with the band and provides musical accompaniment. Chopper Talk. Chris Wallace discusses Mike Wallace Is Here and recent politics. Jamie Bell discusses Skin.
778	July 25, 2019	Jeff Goldblum, Aisha Tyler	N/A
CBS Sports: Mueller Bowl. Mueller: After Dark. The Less You Know. Valerie Simpson sits in with the band and provides musical accompaniment. Late Show Presents: Meanwhile. Jeff Goldblum discusses The Mountain. Aisha Tyler discusses "Courage & Stone", her new cocktail line, and Archer. Late Show Presents: Rehearsal Rewind.
779	July 26, 2019	Ricky Gervais, John Leguizamo	Candice Thompson
Doin' It Donkey Style. Late Show Personal Space with Ricky Gervais (new footage from July 15 episode). John Leguizamo discusses When They See Us and Latin History for Morons. Candice Thompson gives a stand-up performance. Late Show Presents: Audience Questions.
780	July 29, 2019	Idris Elba, Maude Apatow	Perry Farrell
Great White Nationalist Week. Is Donald Trump a Racist?: Episode 3 Million. Late Show's Guess Who... Is Probably Not Going to be President. Idris Elba discusses Fast & Furious Presents: Hobbs & Shaw and Cats. Maude Apatow discusses Euphoria. Perry Farrell performs "Let's All Pray for This World" from his album Kind Heaven.
781	July 30, 2019	Jeff Daniels, Katy Tur & Jacob Soboroff	N/A
Special live episode following the first part of the second official Democratic debate. Scooby-Doo in: The Kooky Case of the Democratic Debate. Democratic Debate Night: 2 Many Candidates 2 Remember: Forget Harder. Late Show Presents: Meanwhile. Meanwhile Presents: Guess Which State This Happened In? Never Mind, It's Florida. Jeff Daniels discusses To Kill a Mockingbird and recent politics. Katy Tur & Jacob Soboroff discuss the first part of the second official debate and American Swamp.
782	July 31, 2019	Rahm Emanuel, Michael Ian Black	N/A
Special live episode following the second part of the second official Democratic debate. Motown Sings the Debates. Democratic Debate Night: 2 Many Candidates 2 Remember: Forget Harder 2: This Time It's Not All White People. Rahm Emanuel discusses the second part of the second official debate and recent politics. Michael Ian Black discusses the second part of the second official debate and his new book, I'm Worried.

=== August ===
No.	Original release date	Guest(s)	Musical/entertainment guest(s)
783	August 1, 2019	Meek Mill, Nicholas Braun	N/A
Chopper Talk. Jon Batiste announces his new album, Anatomy of Angels. Late Show Presents: Meanwhile. Meanwhile Presents: Flight Attention. Late Show's Just One Question with Democratic Candidates (special appearance by Jeff Goldblum). Meek Mill discusses Free Meek. Nicholas Braun discusses Succession.
784	August 5, 2019	Brian Cox, Hannah Gadsby	Shane Torres
Late Show Presents: Super Trump World. Smile File. Stephen acknowledges the mass shootings at El Paso, Texas and Dayton, Ohio. Brian Cox discusses Succession and The Great Society. Hannah Gadsby discusses Nanette and Douglas. Shane Torres gives a stand-up performance.
785	August 6, 2019	Amanda Seyfried, Jacob Tremblay, Brady Noon & Keith L. Williams	N/A
MenWithHandsOnTheirForeheads.com. Doin' It Donkey Style. Late Show Presents: Meanwhile. Amanda Seyfried discusses The Art of Racing in the Rain. Jacob Tremblay, Brady Noon & Keith L. Williams discuss Good Boys. Good Boys Gone Bad.
786	August 7, 2019	Tiffany Haddish, Jared Harris	The Smashing Pumpkins
Chopper Talk. Vote Gregory Whytman 2020! Tiffany Haddish discusses The Kitchen. Jared Harris discusses Chernobyl. The Smashing Pumpkins perform "Knights of Malta" from their album Shiny and Oh So Bright, Vol. 1 / LP: No Past. No Future. No Sun..
787	August 8, 2019	Will Ferrell (in character as Ron Burgundy)	N/A
Doin' It Donkey Style. Late Show's Testosterzone. Will Ferrell, in character as Ron Burgundy, discusses The Ron Burgundy Podcast. Late Show Presents: Rehearsal Rewind.
788	August 12, 2019	Cate Blanchett, Marc Maron	N/A
Conspiracy Today. Doin' It Donkey Style. Cate Blanchett discusses Where'd You Go, Bernadette. Marc Maron discusses GLOW and Joker. Late Show Presents: Rehearsal Rewind.
789	August 13, 2019	Jada Pinkett Smith, Representative Ayanna Pressley	Goo Goo Dolls
Chopper Talk. Late Show Presents: Meanwhile. Meanwhile Presents: Meanbiles. Jada Pinkett Smith discusses Red Table Talk and Angel Has Fallen. Representative Ayanna Pressley discusses recent politics. Goo Goo Dolls perform "Miracle Pill" from their upcoming album of the same name.
790	August 14, 2019	Curtis "50 Cent" Jackson, Jillian Bell	Tori Kelly
Doin' It Donkey Style. Gregory Whytman meets Democratic Candidates at the Iowa State Fair. 50 Cent discusses Power. Jillian Bell discusses Brittany Runs a Marathon. Tori Kelly performs "Sorry Would Go a Long Way" from her album Inspired by True Events.
791	August 15, 2019	Kirsten Dunst, Adam DeVine, Lee Pace	N/A
Straw Wars. Petish'd. Late Show Presents: Meanwhile. Kirsten Dunst discusses On Becoming a God in Central Florida. Adam Devine discusses The Righteous Gemstones. Lee Pace discusses Driven.

=== September ===
No.	Original release date	Guest(s)	Musical/entertainment guest(s)
792	September 3, 2019	Jim Gaffigan, Ann Curry	N/A
Stephen acknowledges the impact of Hurricane Dorian in the Bahamas. Doin' It Donkey Style. Late Show Presents: Meanwhile. Meanwhile Presents: Pope in an Elevator. Jim Gaffigan discusses American Dreamer. Ann Curry discusses Chasing the Cure. Late Show Presents: Rehearsal Rewind.
793	September 4, 2019	Vice President Joe Biden	Pixies
Stephen acknowledges the impact of Hurricane Dorian in the Bahamas. Water-Gate. Joe Biden discusses his 2020 presidential campaign and recent politics. Pixies perform "Catfish Kate" from their album Beneath the Eyrie. Late Show Presents: Rehearsal Rewind.
794	September 5, 2019	Pete Buttigieg, Graham Norton	N/A
Stephen acknowledges the impact of Hurricane Dorian in the Bahamas. Late Show Presents: Meanwhile. Pete Buttigieg discusses his 2020 presidential campaign and recent politics. Graham Norton discusses The Graham Norton Show and his new book, A Keeper.
795	September 9, 2019	Condoleezza Rice, Bill Skarsgård	BANKS
The Trump Invitations. Chopper Talk. Condoleezza Rice discusses recent politics, her tenure as President George W. Bush's Secretary of State, and her new book, To Build a Better World. Bill Skarsgård discusses It Chapter Two. BANKS performs "Contaminated" from her album III.
796	September 10, 2019	Ansel Elgort, Jodi Kantor & Megan Twohey	N/A
Bigly Shop of Horrors. Late Show Presents: Meanwhile. Meanwhile Presents: Runaway Snake. Ansel Elgort discusses West Side Story and The Goldfinch. Jodi Kantor & Megan Twohey discuss their new book, She Said. Late Show Presents: Rehearsal Rewind.
797	September 11, 2019	James McAvoy, Stephen King	Vampire Weekend
Stephen acknowledges the 18th anniversary of 9/11. Chair Chat. James McAvoy discusses It Chapter Two and Macbeth. Stephen King discusses It Chapter Two and his new book, The Institute. Vampire Weekend performs "Sympathy" from their album Father of the Bride.
798	September 12, 2019	Jake Tapper, Jon Lovett	N/A
Special live episode following the third official Democratic debate. Late Show Presents: The Ballad of the Dem Debate. Chopper Talk. Jake Tapper discusses the third official debate. Jon Lovett discusses the third official debate and recent politics.
799	September 16, 2019	Tom Hiddleston, Marie Osmond	N/A
America's Call to Arms. America at Whaaa? Chair Chat. Late Show Presents: Meanwhile. Tom Hiddleston discusses Loki and Betrayal. Marie Osmond discusses The Talk. Stephen acknowledges the death of Ric Ocasek.
800	September 17, 2019	Senator Elizabeth Warren, The Cast of The Brady Bunch	N/A
Stephen acknowledges the show's 800th episode. Elizabeth Warren discusses her 2020 presidential campaign and recent politics. The Cast of The Brady Bunch (Barry Williams, Maureen McCormick, Christopher Knight, Eve Plumb, Mike Lookinland and Susan Olsen) discusses A Very Brady Renovation and the show's 50th anniversary.
801	September 18, 2019	Billy Crystal	Thomas Rhett
Hot Wheels: Trump Edition. Chopper Talk. Doin' It Donkey Style. Implausible Burger. Billy Crystal discusses Here Today and Roast 'Em. Thomas Rhett performs "Remember You Young" from his album Center Point Road.
802	September 19, 2019	Taraji P. Henson, Aasif Mandvi	Kevin Camia
Late Show Presents: Meanwhile. Taraji P. Henson discusses Empire. Aasif Mandvi discusses Evil. Kevin Camia gives a stand-up performance.
803	September 23, 2019	Paul McCartney	N/A
Paul McCartney reacts to BTS's visit to the show and discusses his career, the magic of music, his relationship with John Lennon, the film Yesterday, and his new children's book, Hey Grandude.
804	September 24, 2019	Whoopi Goldberg, Ta-Nehisi Coates	N/A
Where in the World is Donald Colluding With Who in the What? Late Show Presents: Meanwhile. Meanwhile Presents: The Late Box with Stephen Colbert. Whoopi Goldberg discusses recent politics and her new book, The Unqualified Hostess. Ta-Nehisi Coates discusses his work on Marvel's Black Panther and his new book, The Water Dancer.
805	September 25, 2019	Renée Zellweger, Walton Goggins	N/A
A special visit by New Zealand Prime Minister Jacinda Ardern, who invites Stephen to the country. Renée Zellweger discusses Judy. Walton Goggins discusses The Unicorn.
806	September 26, 2019	Senator Bernie Sanders	Brittany Howard
Senator Bernie Sanders discusses recent politics and his 2020 presidential campaign. Late Show Presents: Meanwhile. Meanwhile Presents: French People Problèmes. Brittany Howard performs "Stay High" from her album Jaime.
807	September 27, 2019	Patricia Heaton, Tegan and Sara	Tegan and Sara
Doin' It Donkey Style. Late Show's Uninformed Correspondent: Tariff Edition (special appearance by Paul Krugman). Patricia Heaton discusses Carol's Second Act. Tegan and Sara discuss their new book, High School. Tegan and Sara perform "I'll Be Back Someday" from their album Hey, I'm Just Like You.
808	September 30, 2019	Hillary Rodham Clinton & Chelsea Clinton	Wilco
Conspiracy Today. Doin' It Donkey Style. Hillary & Chelsea Clinton discuss recent politics and their new book, The Book of Gutsy Women. Wilco performs "Everyone Hides" from their album Ode to Joy. Late Show Presents: Rehearsal Rewind.

=== October ===
No.	Original release date	Guest(s)	Musical/entertainment guest(s)
809	October 1, 2019	Rachel Maddow, Thom Yorke	N/A
Don and the Giant Impeach. Late Show's Explainsley to Ainsley. Rachel Maddow discusses recent politics and her new book, Blowout. Thom Yorke discusses Anima.
810	October 2, 2019	Rami Malek, Joey Soloway	Leah Bonnema
Don and the Giant Impeach. Chair Chat. Stephen acknowledges Senator Bernie Sanders' heart procedure. The Werd: Moot. Rami Malek discusses Mr. Robot and No Time to Die. Joey Soloway discusses Transparent. Leah Bonnema gives a stand-up performance.
811	October 3, 2019	Carrie Underwood, Kevin Smith & Jason Mewes	Carrie Underwood
Chopper Talk. Don and the Giant Impeach. Late Show Presents: Meanwhile. Carrie Underwood discusses her upcoming hosting gig for the 53rd Annual CMA Awards. Kevin Smith & Jason Mewes discuss Jay and Silent Bob Reboot. Carrie Underwood performs "Low" from her album Cry Pretty.
812	October 4, 2019	Jon Hamm	N/A
The Adventures of Mike Pence: Ukraine, not Me-Kraine. Corrupt or Dumb? Galino & Farnes: The Attorney Guys. Doin' It Donkey Style. Stephen Colbert & Pete Alonso Hit Things Real Good. Jon Hamm discusses Lucy in the Sky and Top Gun: Maverick. The Late Show Presents: Maybe Coming Soon, with Jon Hamm. Late Show Presents: Audience Questions.
813	October 7, 2019	Neil deGrasse Tyson, Susan Rice	N/A
Late Show Presents: The Whistleblowers. Don and the Giant Impeach. Neil deGrasse Tyson clarifies the sexual misconduct allegations made against him in 2018 and discusses his new book, Letters from an Astrophysicist. Susan Rice discusses recent politics, her tenure as President Obama's National Security Advisor and her new book, Tough Love.
814	October 8, 2019	Will Smith, Andrew Scott	N/A
Late Show Presents: Nursery Rhymes: Under the Bus. Don and the Giant Impeach. Will Smith discusses Gemini Man. Andrew Scott discusses Fleabag and Modern Love.
815	October 9, 2019	Jonathan Van Ness, Brett Gelman	N/A
Doin' It Donkey Style. Late Show's Just One Question, with Democratic Candidates (special appearances by Senator Elizabeth Warren, Mayor Pete Buttigieg, Senator Bernie Sanders and Rob Corddry). Late Show Presents: Meanwhile. Meanwhile Presents: Everything is Killing Us. Jonathan Van Ness discusses Queer Eye and his new book, Over the Top. Brett Gelman discusses Fleabag.
816	October 10, 2019	John Oliver, Paul McCartney, Amy Sedaris	Big Thief
Previously recorded due to other commitments. Guess Who?: The GOP Whistleblower Edition. Doin' It Donkey Style. Don and the Giant Impeach. Flipped Interview with John Oliver (new footage from February 11 episode). Paul McCartney discusses the Beatles' first visit to the United States in 1964 and being knighted by Queen Elizabeth II in 1997 (new footage from September 23 episode). Flipped Interview with Amy Sedaris (new footage from February 18 episode). Big Thief performs "Not" from their album Two Hands.
817	October 21, 2019	Julie Andrews, Jonathan Groff	YUNGBLUD featuring Dan Reynolds
Frank's Banquet Hall. Don and the Giant Impeach. Julie Andrews discusses her career and her new book, Home Work: A Memoir of My Hollywood Years. Jonathan Groff discusses Little Shop of Horrors. YUNGBLUD performs "Original Me" featuring Dan Reynolds from his EP The Underrated Youth. Late Show Presents: Rehearsal Rewind.
818	October 22, 2019	John Lithgow, Julie Andrews, Camila Mendes	N/A
Don and the Giant Impeach. A surprise visit by Rudy Giuliani (John Lithgow). John Lithgow discusses Bombshell and his new book, Dumpty. Stephen and Julie Andrews read A. A. Milne's "The King's Breakfast" (new footage from October 21 episode). Camila Mendes discusses Riverdale. Late Show Presents: Rehearsal Rewind.
819	October 23, 2019	Ronan Farrow, Andrea Savage	N/A
The Crazy Train in: Impeachment Fantasy Land. Don and the Giant Impeach. Ronan Farrow discusses his new book, Catch and Kill: Lies, Spies, and a Conspiracy to Protect Predators. Andrea Savage discusses I'm Sorry.
820	October 24, 2019	Steve Carell	Toby Keith
Risk: Chaos Edition. Late Show Presents: Meanwhile. Steve Carell discusses his years on The Daily Show with Stephen and The Morning Show. Toby Keith performs "That's Country Bro" from his album Greatest Hits: The Show Dog Years.
821	October 25, 2019	Eddie Murphy, Ree Drummond	N/A
The Avengers respond to Marvel movie critics. Doin' It Donkey Style. Eddie Murphy discusses Dolemite Is My Name and looks back at his career. The Late Show Halloween Wiggle, featuring Run the Jewels. Ree Drummond steps into the kitchen with Stephen and discusses her new book, The Pioneer Woman Cooks: The New Frontier.
822	October 28, 2019	Queen Latifah, Radhika Jones	N/A
Stephen acknowledges the death of Abu Bakr al-Baghdadi. The Late Show's Christmas Collection. Queen Latifah discusses the upcoming 30th anniversary of her album, All Hail the Queen, and The Little Mermaid Live!. Radhika Jones discusses her work as editor-in-chief of the Vanity Fair magazine and her new book, Women on Women. Late Show Presents: Rehearsal Rewind.
823	October 29, 2019	Jennifer Aniston, Thomas Middleditch	N/A
Don and the Giant Impeach. Late Show Presents: Meanwhile. Meanwhile Presents: Halloween-while. Jennifer Aniston discusses The Morning Show and the 25th anniversary of Friends. Thomas Middleditch discusses Silicon Valley.
824	October 30, 2019	Norman Reedus, Cynthia Erivo	Miranda Lambert
AirPods Pro. Don and the Giant Impeach. Stephen acknowledges the wildfires currently happening in California. Doin' It Donkey Style. Norman Reedus discusses Ride and The Walking Dead. Cynthia Erivo discusses Harriet and Genius. Miranda Lambert performs "It All Comes Out in the Wash" from her album Wildcard. Late Show Presents: Rehearsal Rewind.
825	October 31, 2019	Representative Nancy Pelosi	N/A
It's The Great Impeachment, Charlie Brown!. Nancy Pe-Ghosty's Haunted House Scream-Peachment Sin-Quiry Into The President's Quid Pro Crow with Boo-Kraine! Coverup! Late Show Presents: Meanwhile. Representative Nancy Pelosi discusses the ongoing impeachment inquiry against President Trump and recent politics. Late Show Presents: Rehearsal Rewind.

=== November ===
No.	Original release date	Guest(s)	Musical/entertainment guest(s)
826	November 1, 2019	Conan O'Brien, Curtis "50 Cent" Jackson, Rob Corddry	N/A
Godzilla 2020. A PSA for celebrities thinking of protesting climate change (special appearance by Sam Waterston). Flipped Interview with Conan O'Brien (new footage from February 3 episode). Flipped Interview with Curtis "50 Cent" Jackson (new footage from August 14 episode). Rob Corddry discusses The Unicorn. Late Show Presents: Audience Questions.
827	November 4, 2019	Tim McGraw, Senator Sherrod Brown	N/A
Don and the Giant Impeach. Tim McGraw discusses the beginnings of his career and his new book, Grit and Grace. Senator Sherrod Brown discusses recent politics and his new book, Desk 88. Late Show Presents: Rehearsal Rewind.
828	November 5, 2019	Elizabeth Banks, Senator Amy Klobuchar	N/A
Don and the Giant Impeach. Late Show Presents: Meanwhile. Meanwhile Presents: Flight Attention. Elizabeth Banks discusses Charlie's Angels. Senator Amy Klobuchar discusses recent politics and her 2020 presidential campaign.
829	November 6, 2019	Helen Mirren & Ian McKellen, MasterChef Junior contestants	N/A
Don and the Giant Impeach. Stephen presents new Christmas items from his own lifestyle brand, Covetton House. Helen Mirren & Ian McKellen discuss Catherine the Great, Cats and The Good Liar. Three MasterChef Junior contestants, Cory, Remy and Che, step into the kitchen with Stephen and discuss their new book, MasterChef Junior Bakes!.
830	November 7, 2019	John Dickerson	King Princess
GOP Pictures Presents: Graham with the Wind. Don and the Giant Impeach. Late Show Presents: Meanwhile. John Dickerson discusses 60 Minutes and recent politics. King Princess performs "Hit the Back" from her album Cheap Queen.
831	November 12, 2019	Liev Schreiber, Daniel Kaluuya	Cold War Kids
Impeachment Hearing Eve. Doin' It Donkey Style. Late Show Presents: Meanwhile. Liev Schreiber discusses Ray Donovan. Daniel Kaluuya discusses Queen & Slim. Cold War Kids perform "Complainer" from their album New Age Norms 1.
832	November 13, 2019	Tim Robbins, Nicolle Wallace	N/A
Don and the Giant Impeach. Chair Chat. Tim Robbins discusses Dark Waters. Nicolle Wallace discusses Deadline: White House and recent politics.
833	November 14, 2019	Mark Ruffalo, Andy Cohen	Thom Yorke
A Brief Impeachment Intermission. Don and the Giant Impeach. SiriusXM Cam. Late Show Presents: Meanwhile. Mark Ruffalo discusses Dark Waters and Avengers: Endgame. Andy Cohen discusses Watch What Happens Live and BravoCon. Thom Yorke performs "Daily Battles".
834	November 15, 2019	David Harbour, Karen Olivo & Aaron Tveit	Moulin Rouge! The Musical
Previously recorded due to other commitments. Don and the Giant Impeach. A Late Show Impeachment Pre-Enactment. Doin' It Donkey Style. Small Town, Big News. Presidential Candidate Fantasy Camp 2020. David Harbour discusses Stranger Things. Karen Olivo & Aaron Tveit discuss Moulin Rouge! The Musical, as the cast performs "Your Song".
835	November 18, 2019	Adam Driver	The 1975
Don and the Giant Impeach. Brandon Niederauer sits in with the band and provides musical accompaniment. New Zealand Week: Stephen Colbert, the Newest Zealander visits Prime Minister Jacinda Ardern (special appearance by Lorde). Adam Driver discusses Marriage Story and Star Wars: The Rise of Skywalker. The 1975 performs "Frail State of Mind" from their upcoming album Notes on a Conditional Form. Late Show Presents: Rehearsal Rewind.
836	November 19, 2019	Helena Bonham Carter	N/A
Don and the Giant Impeach. Fartgate. New Zealand Week: Stephen Colbert, the Newest Zealander learns how to be a Kiwi in Wellington (special appearances by Lucy Lawless and Bret McKenzie). Helena Bonham Carter discusses The Crown.
837	November 20, 2019	John Heilemann & Alex Wagner	N/A
Special live episode following the fifth official Democratic debate. Don and the Giant Impeach. Stephen Colbert, the Newest Zealander learns how to play rugby (special appearances by Piri Weepu, DJ Forbes and Laura McGoldrick). John Heilemann & Alex Wagner discuss the fifth official Democratic debate and recent politics.
838	November 21, 2019	Senator Kamala Harris	Lady Antebellum
Game of Phones: A Saga of Lies and Liars. Stephen Colbert, the Newest Zealander participates in the next installment of The Lord of the Rings saga (special appearances by Peter Jackson, Ian McKellen, Viggo Mortensen and Elijah Wood). Senator Kamala Harris discusses recent politics and her 2020 presidential campaign. Lady Antebellum performs "Ocean" from their album of the same name.
839	November 22, 2019	Daniel Craig, Lena Waithe	N/A
Doin' It Donkey Style. Stephen Colbert, the Newest Zealander treks to remote parts of New Zealand to test his mettle. Daniel Craig discusses No Time to Die and Knives Out. Lena Waithe discusses Queen & Slim.
840	November 25, 2019	Robert De Niro, J. J. Abrams	N/A
Conspiracy Today. Don and the Giant Impeach. Robert De Niro discusses recent politics, The Irishman and Joker. Stephen and Robert De Niro switch places. J. J. Abrams discusses Star Wars: The Rise of Skywalker. Late Show Presents: Rehearsal Rewind.
841	November 26, 2019	Paul Rudd, Adrienne Warren	N/A
Don and the Giant Impeach. Late Show Presents: Meanwhile. Paul Rudd discusses Living with Yourself. Adrianne Warren discusses TINA: The Tina Turner Musical.
842	November 27, 2019	LL Cool J, Chef José Andrés	N/A
Thanksgiving Moderating Tips (special appearance by Chris Wallace). Doin' It Donkey Style. LL Cool J discusses NCIS: Los Angeles. Chef José Andrés discusses his work for World Central Kitchen and his new book, Vegetables Unleashed. Chef José Andrés steps into the kitchen with Stephen.

=== December ===
No.	Original release date	Guest(s)	Musical/entertainment guest(s)
843	December 4, 2019	Eddie Redmayne, Joe Pera	Pharrell Williams
Don and the Giant Impeach. Doin' It Donkey Style. Eddie Redmayne discusses The Aeronauts. Joe Pera discusses Joe Pera Talks with You. Pharrell Williams performs "Letter to My Godfather", from the film The Black Godfather.
844	December 5, 2019	Scarlett Johansson	The Weeknd
Don and the Giant Impeach. Late Show Presents: Meanwhile. Scarlett Johansson discusses Marriage Story and Black Widow. The Weeknd performs "Heartless".
845	December 6, 2019	Pharrell Williams, Chris Parnell	The Weeknd
Don and the Giant Impeach. Doin' It Donkey Style. Real News Tonight. Pharrell Williams discusses The Black Godfather. Chris Parnell discusses Rick and Morty. The Weeknd performs "Blinding Lights".
846	December 9, 2019	Saoirse Ronan, Tom Brokaw	N/A
Don and the Giant Impeach. Saoirse Ronan discusses Little Women. Tom Brokaw discusses recent politics and his new book, The Fall of Richard Nixon. Late Show Presents: Rehearsal Rewind.
847	December 10, 2019	Ed Harris, Florence Pugh	Jon Batiste
Don and the Giant Impeach. Late Show Presents: Meanwhile. Ed Harris discusses To Kill a Mockingbird and Westworld. Florence Pugh discusses Little Women and Midsommar. Jon Batiste performs "Prince" from his album Chronology of a Dream: Live at the Village Vanguard, with Stay Human providing musical accompaniment.
848	December 11, 2019	Clive Owen, Samantha Power	Thomas Rhett
Impeachment: After Dark. Don and the Giant Impeach. Clive Owen discusses The Song of Names. Samantha Power discusses recent politics and her new book, The Education of an Idealist. Thomas Rhett performs "Notice" from his album Center Point Road.
849	December 12, 2019	Representative Adam Schiff	N/A
Don and the Giant Impeach. Late Show Presents: Meanwhile. Meanwhile Presents: Peen-While. Representative Adam Schiff discusses the ongoing impeachment inquiry against President Trump and recent politics.
850	December 13, 2019	Mark Harmon	Caitlin Weierhauser
Doin' It Donkey Style. Late Show's Just One Question: Star Wars Edition (special appearances by John Boyega, Oscar Isaac, Daisy Ridley, Billy Dee Williams, J. J. Abrams, Kelly Marie Tran, Anthony Daniels, Naomi Ackie and Keri Russell). Mark Harmon discusses NCIS. Caitlin Weierhauser gives a stand-up performance.
851	December 16, 2019	Aaron Paul	Idina Menzel
Hallmark: After Dark. Don and the Giant Impeach. Doin' It Donkey Style. First Drafts: Holiday Cards. Aaron Paul discusses Westworld and Truth Be Told. Idina Menzel performs "Christmas Just Ain't Christmas" from her album Christmas: A Season of Love. Late Show Presents: Rehearsal Rewind.
852	December 17, 2019	Jamie Foxx	N/A
Rudy! Don and the Giant Impeach. Doin' It Donkey Style. Late Show Presents: Meanwhile (special appearance by Tony the Tiger). Meanwhile Presents: Peen-While. Jamie Foxx discusses Just Mercy.
853	December 18, 2019	Charlize Theron, Martha Stewart	N/A
Merry Impeachment. Don and the Giant Impeach. A surprise visit by Rudy Giuliani (special appearance by John Lithgow). Charlize Theron discusses Bombshell. Martha Stewart steps into the kitchen with Stephen and discusses her new book, Cookie Perfection.
854	December 19, 2019	Jennifer Hudson, Jonathan Pryce	Sharon Van Etten featuring Norah Jones
Late Show Presents: Once Upon Impeachment. Jennifer Hudson discusses Respect and Cats. Jennifer Hudson and Stephen sing "O Holy Night". Jonathan Pryce discusses The Two Popes. Sharon Van Etten performs "Seventeen" from her album Remind Me Tomorrow, featuring Norah Jones.
