= List of The Late Show with Stephen Colbert episodes (2017) =

- No. of episodes: 197 (and 1 special)

Release
- Original network: CBS
- Original release: January 3 – December 15, 2017

Season chronology
- ← Previous; 2016 episodes Next → 2018 episodes

This is the list of episodes of The Late Show with Stephen Colbert that aired in 2017.

== 2017 ==
=== January ===
| No. | Original release date | Guest(s) | Musical/entertainment guest(s) |
|---|---|---|---|
| 267 | January 3, 2017 | Oprah Winfrey | Pretty Yende |
Oprah Winfrey discusses her interview with First Lady Michelle Obama and her new book, Food, Health, and Happiness. Oprah Helps Stephen Make Anything Exciting! Oprah Winfrey and Stephen make "The Sexy Breakfast". Pretty Yende performs "Una voce poco fa" from The Barber of Seville.
| 268 | January 4, 2017 | Kate Beckinsale, Chris Messina, Jen Kirkman | N/A |
Tips for Werewolf Hunting. The Adventures of Lil' Titey. Kate Beckinsale discusses Underworld: Blood Wars and teaches Stephen to speak Russian. Chris Messina discusses Live by Night and his early acting career. Jen Kirkman discusses Just Keep Livin'.
| 269 | January 5, 2017 | Adam Driver, Alexa Davalos | Whitney |
Trump and Cover. Galino & Farnes: Pornography Lawyers. Adam Driver discusses Silence and the recent passing of Carrie Fisher, in addition to thumb wrestling with Stephen. Community Calendar: Mishawaka, Indiana. Alexa Davalos discusses The Man in the High Castle. Whitney performs "Golden Days" from their album Light Upon the Lake.
| 270 | January 6, 2017 | Charlie Rose, Hayden Panettiere, Jack Maxwell | N/A |
Stephen Colbert's Midnight Confessions. Charlie Rose discusses CBS This Morning, the presidential race and the incoming administration. Hayden Panettiere discusses Nashville, her life and her career. Jack Maxwell discusses Booze Traveler.
| 271 | January 9, 2017 | Billy Joel, Josh Holloway | Billy Joel |
Billy Joel discusses his career and ranks his top five songs. True Stories Behind the Hits with Billy Joel. Billy Joel performs "Miami 2017 (Seen the Lights Go Out on Broadway)". Josh Holloway discusses Colony.
| 272 | January 10, 2017 | Andrew Garfield, Erin Andrews | Cage the Elephant |
Andrew Garfield discusses Silence. Erin Andrews discusses her sportscasting career. Cage the Elephant performs "Cold Cold Cold" from their album Tell Me I'm Pretty.
| 273 | January 11, 2017 | Jude Law, Gabrielle Union, Thomas L. Friedman | N/A |
Jude Law discusses The Young Pope. Gabrielle Union discusses Being Mary Jane. Thomas L. Friedman discusses Thank You for Being Late and the incoming administration.
| 274 | January 12, 2017 | Tom Selleck, Craig Robinson | A$AP Mob |
Lesser Sponsor Roundup. Tom Selleck discusses Blue Bloods and his career. Craig Robinson discusses his band, The Nasty Delicious, and his music career. A$AP Mob performs "Crazy Brazy" from their album Cozy Tapes Vol. 1: Friends.
| 275 | January 13, 2017 | Cuba Gooding Jr., Rupert Friend | Gary Gulman |
The Big Furry Hat. Cuba Gooding Jr. discusses The People v. O. J. Simpson: American Crime Story and his acting career. Rupert Friend discusses Homeland. Gary Gulman gives a stand-up performance.
| 276 | January 16, 2017 | Sarah Paulson, Corey Stoll | Nick Grant with Watch the Duck |
The Werd "Repeal and Erase". Sarah Paulson discusses The People v. O. J. Simpson: American Crime Story. Puff, Puff, Act with Sarah Paulson. Corey Stoll discusses Gold. Nick Grant performs a medley featuring Watch the Duck.
| 277 | January 17, 2017 | Billy Eichner, Mel B, Gilbert Gottfried | N/A |
Billy Eichner discusses Billy on the Street. Mel B discusses Chicago, her experience with the Spice Girls, and practices the Chicago accent with Stephen. RejecTED Talks. Gilbert Gottfried discusses Amazing Colossal Podcast and his comedy.
| 278 | January 18, 2017 | Idina Menzel, Rachel Bloom, Louie Anderson | N/A |
Stephen Colbert's Midnight Confessions. Idina Menzel discusses Beaches. Rachel Bloom discusses Crazy Ex-Girlfriend. Louie Anderson discusses Baskets.
| 279 | January 19, 2017 | Johnny Galecki, Chris Matthews | Bash & Pop |
Sunny Pawar makes a cameo appearance. The Werd (Stephen Colbert summarizes the presidency of Barack Obama). Johnny Galecki discusses Rings. Chris Matthews discusses Hardball and the presidential transition. Bash & Pop performs "On the Rocks" from their album Anything Could Happen.
| 280 | January 20, 2017 | Jim Gaffigan, Cristela Alonzo | The Avett Brothers |
Jim Gaffigan discusses his career and his appearances on Law & Order. Cristela Alonzo discusses Lower Classy. The Avett Brothers perform "Give Me Love (Give Me Peace on Earth)".
| 281 | January 30, 2017 | Leslie Mann, Lewis Black, Dan Levy | N/A |
Late Show Family Meeting with Leslie Mann. Leslie Mann discusses The Comedian and her family life, with her spouse Judd Apatow making a cameo appearance. Lewis Black discusses Rock Dog and recent politics. Dan Levy discusses Schitt's Creek.
| 282 | January 31, 2017 | Josh Groban, Rachael Ray | Japandroids |
What's Happening? Jon Stewart makes a cameo appearance, issuing executive orders. Josh Groban discusses Natasha, Pierre & The Great Comet of 1812. Rachael Ray discusses Rachael Ray. Japandroids perform "Near to the Wild Heart of Life" from their album of the same name.

=== February ===
| No. | Original release date | Guest(s) | Musical/entertainment guest(s) |
|---|---|---|---|
| 283 | February 1, 2017 | Ricky Gervais, Christina Ricci | Jain |
Ricky Gervais discusses David Brent: Life on the Road and has a religious debate with Stephen. Christina Ricci discusses Z: The Beginning of Everything. Jain performs "Come" from her album Zanaka.
| 284 | February 2, 2017 | Dr. Phil McGraw, Michael Bolton | Maren Morris |
Dr. Phil McGraw offers his diagnosis for America, in addition to sorting out the differences between Stephen and Paul Dinello's dog. The Late Show Waxing Presidential. Michael Bolton discusses Michael Bolton's Big, Sexy Valentine's Day Special, in addition to performing "Every Day is Groundhog Day" with Stephen. Maren Morris performs "My Church" from her album Hero.
| 285 | February 3, 2017 | Priyanka Chopra, Thomas Sadoski | Pat Brown |
The Big Furry Hat. Priyanka Chopra discusses Quantico and Indian cinema. Thomas Sadoski discusses Life in Pieces and fatherhood. Pat Brown gives a stand-up performance.
| 286 | February 6, 2017 | Paul Giamatti, Wendy Williams | Highly Suspect |
Paul Giamatti discusses Billions and his love for science fiction. Wendy Williams discusses The Wendy Williams Show. Highly Suspect performs "Little One" from their album The Boy Who Died Wolf.
| 287 | February 7, 2017 | John Oliver, Isabelle Huppert | The Avett Brothers |
John Oliver discusses Last Week Tonight with John Oliver and recent politics. Community Calendar: Bedford of Bedfordshire. Isabelle Huppert discusses Elle and French cinema. The Avett Brothers perform "True Sadness" from their album of the same name.
| 288 | February 8, 2017 | Robert De Niro, Jake Tapper, Ezra Edelman | N/A |
Flo Morrissey and Matthew E. White sit in with the band and provide musical accompaniment. Robert De Niro discusses The Comedian and goes souvenir shopping with Stephen. Jake Tapper discusses The History of Comedy and recent politics. Ezra Edelman discusses O.J.: Made in America.
| 289 | February 9, 2017 | David Oyelowo, Taran Killam | Rae Sremmurd |
"53 Years Ago Tonight", with Matthew Broderick making a cameo appearance. Stephen Colbert's Midnight Confessions. David Oyelowo discusses A United Kingdom and his acting career. Taran Killam discusses his comedy. Rae Sremmurd performs "Black Beatles" from their album SremmLife 2, with Jon Batiste and Stay Human providing musical accompaniment.
| 290 | February 10, 2017 | Will Arnett, Pete Holmes | Paul Mecurio |
First Drafts. Will Arnett discusses The Lego Batman Movie. Pete Holmes discusses Crashing and his recent engagement. Paul Mecurio gives a stand-up performance.
| 291 | February 13, 2017 | Shailene Woodley, Laverne Cox, Marty & Rick Lagina | N/A |
Piano-1-O-Fun with Jon Batiste: How to Love. Shailene Woodley discusses Big Little Lies and her activism. Laverne Cox discusses Doubt. Marty & Rick Lagina discuss The Curse of Oak Island.
| 292 | February 14, 2017 | Christine Baranski | Hans Zimmer |
Christine Baranski discusses The Good Fight. Kids Pitch: Teenage War (with appearances by Andrew Garfield, Idina Menzel, John Oliver, John Malkovich and Priyanka Chopra). Hans Zimmer performs the score of Planet Earth II.
| 293 | February 15, 2017 | Bob Odenkirk, Tatiana Maslany, George Saunders | N/A |
Bob Odenkirk discusses Girlfriend's Day. The Late Show: The Movie with Bob Odenkirk as Stephen Colbert as Bob Odenkirk. Tatiana Maslany discusses The Other Half. George Saunders discusses Lincoln in the Bardo.
| 294 | February 16, 2017 | Sally Field, Maggie Siff | Lady Antebellum |
The Big Furry Hat. Sally Field discusses The Glass Menagerie. Maggie Siff discusses Billions. Lady Antebellum performs "You Look Good", with Jon Batiste and Stay Human providing musical accompaniment.
| 295 | February 17, 2017 | Julie Andrews, Christina Hendricks | The Umbilical Brothers |
Julie Andrews discusses Julie's Greenroom and her career, in addition to re-enacting scenes from My Fair Lady with Stephen. Christina Hendricks discusses Fist Fight. The Umbilical Brothers give a comedy performance.
| 296 | February 20, 2017 | Uma Thurman, Jason Jones | Alison Krauss with Paul Shaffer |
Uma Thurman discusses Imposters. Jason Jones discusses The Detour. Alison Krauss performs "I Never Cared For You" with former Late Show bandleader Paul Shaffer from her album Windy City.
| 297 | February 21, 2017 | Joe Scarborough, Kate Upton, Yvette Nicole Brown | N/A |
Joe Scarborough discusses Morning Joe and recent politics, in addition to performing "(What's So Funny 'Bout) Peace, Love, and Understanding", with Jon Batiste and Stay Human providing musical accompaniment. Kate Upton discusses her appearance on the Sports Illustrated Swimsuit Issue. Yvette Nicole Brown discusses SuperMansion.
| 298 | February 22, 2017 | Kelly Ripa, Billy Gardell | The Lemon Twigs |
The Late Show Presidential Leak-crets. Kelly Ripa discusses Live with Kelly and her family. Billy Gardell discusses Sun Records. The Lemon Twigs performs "I Wanna Prove to You" from their album Do Hollywood.
| 299 | February 23, 2017 | Aubrey Plaza, Bradley Whitford | Lupe Fiasco |
Rescue Dog Rescue with Aubrey Plaza. Aubrey Plaza discusses Legion. Bradley Whitford discusses Get Out. Lupe Fiasco performs "Jump" from his album Drogas Light, featuring Gizzle.
| 300 | February 24, 2017 | Allison Williams, Cush Jumbo | Carmen Lynch |
Late Show Best Picture Poster Recap. Stephen visits the NASA. Allison Williams discusses Get Out. Cush Jumbo discusses The Good Fight. Carmen Lynch gives a stand-up performance.
| 301 | February 27, 2017 | Connie Britton, Zoey Deutch | Lori McKenna |
Jon Stewart makes a special appearance and takes over hosting duty. Connie Britton discusses Nashville. Zoey Deutch discusses Before I Fall. Lori McKenna performs "Humble and Kind" from her album The Bird and the Rifle.
| 302 | February 28, 2017 | Josh Earnest, Lisa Kudrow, Tony Rock | N/A |
Special live episode after President Donald Trump's speech to a joint session of Congress. Josh Earnest discusses recent politics and his tenure as the White House Press Secretary. Lisa Kudrow discusses Table 19 and Who Do You Think You Are? Tony Rock discusses Game of Dating.

=== March ===
| No. | Original release date | Guest(s) | Musical/entertainment guest(s) |
|---|---|---|---|
| 303 | March 1, 2017 | Patrick Stewart, Chris Colfer, Roy Wood Jr. | N/A |
Jon Batiste's PSA: Hey, White People! Patrick Stewart discusses Logan. Chris Colfer discusses Stranger Than Fanfiction. Roy Wood Jr. discusses Father Figure and recent politics.
| 304 | March 2, 2017 | Hugh Jackman, Condola Rashad | The Flaming Lips |
The Late Show Presidential Leak-crets. Hugh Jackman discusses Logan. Condola Rashad discusses Billions. The Flaming Lips perform "There Should Be Unicorns" from their album Oczy Mlody.
| 305 | March 3, 2017 | Cate Blanchett, Paul Rust | Mo Amer |
The Late Show Street Show. Cate Blanchett discusses The Present. Paul Rust discusses Love. Mo Amer gives a stand-up performance.
| 306 | March 6, 2017 | Anderson Cooper, Judd Apatow | Jidenna |
Anderson Cooper discusses recent politics. Judd Apatow discusses Love. Jidenna performs "Bambi" from his album The Chief.
| 307 | March 7, 2017 | Kevin Kline, Jerrod Carmichael, General Michael Hayden | N/A |
Kevin Kline discusses Present Laughter. Jerrod Carmichael discusses The Carmichael Show. Michael Hayden discusses recent politics and Playing to the Edge.
| 308 | March 8, 2017 | Mark Halperin & John Heilemann, Michael Ian Black, Jackson Galaxy | N/A |
Mark Halperin & John Heilemann discuss The Circus and recent politics. Michael Ian Black discusses recent politics. Jackson Galaxy discusses cats.
| 309 | March 9, 2017 | Kristen Stewart, Maz Jobrani | Dawes |
Stephen Colbert's Midnight Confessions. Kristen Stewart discusses Personal Shopper. Maz Jobrani discusses Superior Donuts. Dawes performs "Roll with the Punches" from their album We're All Gonna Die.
| 310 | March 10, 2017 | Felicity Huffman, Jurnee Smollett-Bell | Anthony DeVito |
Stephen and a team of expert builders get started on Trump's wall. Felicity Huffman discusses American Crime. Jurnee Smollett-Bell discusses Underground. Anthony DeVito gives a stand-up performance.
| 311 | March 13, 2017 | Ewan McGregor, Finn Wittrock | The Shins |
Ewan McGregor discusses Beauty and the Beast and T2 Trainspotting. Finn Wittrock discusses The Glass Menagerie. The Shins performs "Name for You" from their album Heartworms.
| 312 | March 14, 2017 | Neil deGrasse Tyson, Todd Barry | N/A |
The Big Furry Hat. Neil deGrasse Tyson discusses extraterrestrial weather and TRAPPIST-1. Todd Barry discusses Thank You for Coming to Hattiesburg.
| 313 | March 15, 2017 | Jessica Lange, Bassem Youssef, Judy Gold | N/A |
Jessica Lange discusses Feud. Bassem Youssef discusses Revolution for Dummies and his comedy career. Judy Gold discusses I'm Dying Up Here.
| 314 | March 20, 2017 | Bryan Cranston, Audra McDonald | Greer Barnes |
The Werd (Stephen Colbert discusses President Donald Trump's new budget). Rescue Dog Rescue with Bryan Cranston. Bryan Cranston discusses Power Rangers. Audra McDonald discusses Beauty and the Beast. Greer Barnes gives a stand-up performance.
| 315 | March 21, 2017 | Ryan Reynolds, Josh Lucas, Andy Daly | Green Day |
Ryan Reynolds time-travels into Stephen's monologue. Big Questions with Even Bigger Stars (with Ryan Reynolds). Josh Lucas discusses The Most Hated Woman in America. Andy Daly discusses Review. Green Day performs "Still Breathing" from their album Revolution Radio.
| 316 | March 22, 2017 | Glenn Close, Michael McKean, H. Jon Benjamin | N/A |
Glenn Close discusses Sunset Boulevard. Michael McKean discusses This Is Spinal Tap and Better Call Saul. H. Jon Benjamin discusses Archer, in addition to performing "I Can't Play Piano, Pt. 1" from his album Well, I Should Have..., with Jon Batiste & Stay Human and Stephen providing musical accompaniment.
| 317 | March 27, 2017 | Lily Tomlin & Jane Fonda, Jay Chandrasekhar | Aimee Mann |
Lily Tomlin & Jane Fonda discuss Grace and Frankie. Jay Chandrasekhar discusses Super Troopers 2 and Mustache Shenanigans. Aimee Mann performs "Goose Snow Cone" from her album Mental Illness, with Jon Batiste and Stay Human providing musical accompaniment.
| 318 | March 28, 2017 | Hank Azaria, Kate Walsh | Circus 1903 |
Hank Azaria discusses Brockmire. Kate Walsh discusses 13 Reasons Why. Circus 1903 gives a circus performance.
| 319 | March 29, 2017 | Emma Roberts, Ken Jeong, Luke Bryan & Dierks Bentley | Luke Bryan & Dierks Bentley |
Emma Roberts discusses The Blackcoat's Daughter. Ken Jeong discusses Dr. Ken. Luke Bryan & Dierks Bentley discuss the Academy of Country Music Awards and perform "Ramblin' Fever".
| 320 | March 30, 2017 | Marisa Tomei, Hugh Dancy | Broken Social Scene |
The Late Show Presidential Leak-crets. Marisa Tomei discusses How to Transcend a Happy Marriage and acts out a Lady Gaga biopic with Stephen. Hugh Dancy discusses The Path. Broken Social Scene performs "Halfway Home".
| 321 | March 31, 2017 | Susan Sarandon, Joey McIntyre, Robert Klein | N/A |
Stephen Colbert's Midnight Confessions. Susan Sarandon discusses Feud. Joey McIntyre discusses Return of the Mac. Robert Klein discusses Robert Klein Still Can't Stop His Leg.

=== April ===
| No. | Original release date | Guest(s) | Musical/entertainment guest(s) |
|---|---|---|---|
| 322 | April 3, 2017 | Jason Sudeikis, Jennifer Esposito | Joey Bada$$ |
"One Average Moment", with Jason Sudeikis. Jason Sudeikis discusses Colossal. Jennifer Esposito discusses NCIS. Lyrics We Can Afford To Songs We Love with Green Day. Joey Bada$$ performs "Land of the Free" from his album All-Amerikkkan Badass.
| 323 | April 4, 2017 | Louis C.K., Ernie Johnson Jr. | Father John Misty |
Louis C.K. discusses The Dana Carvey Show and 2017, his new stand-up special. Ernie Johnson Jr. discusses Inside the NBA and his new book, Unscripted. Father John Misty performs "Ballad of the Dying Man" from his album Pure Comedy.
| 324 | April 5, 2017 | Sigourney Weaver, Jon Favreau, Jon Lovett, Tommy Vietor | N/A |
Steve Martin teaches Stephen how to do comedy. Stephen goes undercover as an H&R Block tax pro. Sigourney Weaver discusses The Assignment. Celebrity Pet Peeves. Jon Favreau, Jon Lovett and Tommy Vietor discuss Pod Save America.
| 325 | April 6, 2017 | Jessica Lange, Kadeem Hardison, Judy Gold | N/A |
Rebroadcast of March 15, 2017 episode with newly-recorded monologue; Stephen acknowledges the death of Don Rickles.
| 326 | April 7, 2017 | Mandy Patinkin, Zosia Mamet, Jerrod Carmichael | N/A |
Mandy Patinkin discusses Homeland and the refugee crisis. Zosia Mamet discusses Girls. Jerrod Carmichael discusses The Carmichael Show (interview rebroadcast from March 7 episode).
| 327 | April 17, 2017 | Jennifer Hudson, Chris Hayes, Christian Borle | N/A |
Brain Fight with Tuck Buckford. Jennifer Hudson discusses Sandy Wexler. Chris Hayes discusses recent politics and his new book, A Colony in a Nation. Christian Borle discusses Charlie and the Chocolate Factory.
| 328 | April 18, 2017 | Alec Baldwin, Charlamagne tha God | N/A |
Taj Mahal and Keb' Mo' sit in with the band and provide musical accompaniment. Alec Baldwin discusses Saturday Night Live and his new book, Nevertheless. The Late Show Presents: Too Much Exposition Theatre with Alec Baldwin. Charlamagne tha God discusses recent politics and his new book, Black Privilege.
| 329 | April 19, 2017 | Rose Byrne, Lewis Black | PJ Harvey |
Brain Fight with Tuck Buckford. Stephen Colbert's Midnight Confessions. Rose Byrne discusses The Immortal Life of Henrietta Lacks. Lewis Black discusses recent politics. PJ Harvey performs "The Community of Hope" from her album The Hope Six Demolition Project.
| 330 | April 20, 2017 | Elisabeth Moss, Anthony Atamanuik | Sheryl Crow |
The Big Furry Hat. Elisabeth Moss discusses The Handmaid's Tale. Anthony Atamanuik discusses The President Show. Sheryl Crow discusses her new album, Be Myself, and performs "Halfway There".
| 331 | April 21, 2017 | Rosario Dawson, Renée Elise Goldsberry, Moshe Kasher | N/A |
Brain Fight with Tuck Buckford. Exclusive Alien trailer with Sigourney Weaver. Rosario Dawson discusses Unforgettable. Renée Elise Goldsberry discusses The Immortal Life of Henrietta Lacks. Moshe Kasher discusses Problematic.
| 332 | April 24, 2017 | Allison Janney, Sheryl Sandberg | Marty Stuart |
Allison Janney discusses Six Degrees of Separation. Late Show New Vocal Warm-ups with Allison Janney. Sheryl Sandberg discusses LeanIn.Org and her new book, Option B. Marty Stuart performs "Time Don't Wait" from his album Way Out West.
| 333 | April 25, 2017 | John Legend, Kelly Osbourne | John Legend |
Dr. John sits in with the band and provides musical accompaniment. Brain Fight with Tuck Buckford. Stephen Colbert Gets All Up In Your Faith. John Legend discusses Time 100. John Legend Makes Mundane Things Sound Sexy. Kelly Osbourne discusses her book There Is No F*cking Secret. John Legend performs "Surefire" from his album Darkness and Light.
| 334 | April 26, 2017 | America Ferrera, Thomas Middleditch, Dave & Virginia Grohl | N/A |
The Preservation Hall Jazz Band sits in with the band and provides musical accompaniment. America Ferrera discusses Superstore. "Attention, Shoppers" with America Ferrera. Thomas Middleditch discusses Silicon Valley. Dave & Virginia Grohl discuss her book, From Cradle to Stage.
| 335 | April 27, 2017 | LL Cool J, Phillipa Soo | Gorillaz featuring Mavis Staples and Pusha T |
Stephen Colbert's Midnight Confessions. LL Cool J discusses NCIS: Los Angeles. Phillipa Soo discusses Hamilton and Amélie. Gorillaz perform "Let Me Out" from their album Humanz, featuring Mavis Staples and Pusha T.
| 336 | April 28, 2017 | Tom Hanks, Anna Baryshnikov | N/A |
Tom Hanks discusses The Circle. Anna Baryshnikov discusses Superior Donuts.

=== May ===
| No. | Original release date | Guest(s) | Musical/entertainment guest(s) |
|---|---|---|---|
| 337 | May 1, 2017 | Chris Pratt, Neil deGrasse Tyson | Ryan Adams |
A History Lesson for the President. Chris Pratt discusses Guardians of the Galaxy Vol. 2. Neil deGrasse Tyson discusses the Cassini-Huygens spacecraft and his new book, Astrophysics for People in a Hurry. Ryan Adams performs "Outbound Train" from his album Prisoner.
| 338 | May 2, 2017 | Amy Schumer, Gabourey Sidibe | N/A |
Amy Schumer discusses Snatched. Waking Up with Jon Batiste. Gabourey Sidibe discusses her new book, This Is Just My Face, Try Not to Stare.
| 339 | May 3, 2017 | Jim Parsons, Jeff Garlin, Paul Scheer | N/A |
Jim Parsons discusses The Big Bang Theory. Rescue Dog Rescue with Jim Parsons. Jeff Garlin remembers his Second City years with Stephen and discusses Handsome: A Netflix Mystery Movie. Paul Scheer discusses Veep.
| 340 | May 4, 2017 | Charles Barkley, Debra Winger | Sarah Tollemache |
The Dap-Kings sit in with the band and provide musical accompaniment. Charles Barkley discusses the NBA Playoffs and American Race. Debra Winger discusses The Lovers. Sarah Tollemache gives a stand-up performance.
| 341 | May 5, 2017 | Richard Gere, Maria Bamford | Perfume Genius |
The Late Show Presents: Stephen Colbert's Quest for The Greatest Show on Earth, with Ringling Bros. and Barnum & Bailey Circus. Richard Gere discusses The Dinner. Maria Bamford discusses Old Baby, her new comedy special. Perfume Genius performs "Slip Away" from his album No Shape.
| 342 | May 8, 2017 | Rami Malek, Bill Nye | Roger Waters |
Stephen Colbert's Midnight Confessions. Rami Malek discusses Buster's Mal Heart and Bohemian Rhapsody. Bill Nye discusses the March for Science and Bill Nye Saves the World. Roger Waters performs "Déjà Vu" from his album Is This the Life We Really Want?
| 343 | May 9, 2017 | Jon Stewart, Samantha Bee, John Oliver, Ed Helms, Rob Corddry | N/A |
The Daily Show reunion. A Daily Show Flashback. Jon Stewart discusses recent politics. Stewart, Samantha Bee, John Oliver, Ed Helms and Rob Corddry reminisce their years together at Comedy Central with Stephen.
| 344 | May 10, 2017 | Megan Mullally & Nick Offerman, Seth Meyers | Dave Matthews with Tim Reynolds |
Megan Mullally & Nick Offerman discuss Summer of 69: No Apostrophe. Seth Meyers discusses Late Night with Seth Meyers. Dave Matthews discusses his career and the Fyre Festival disaster. Matthews performs "Samurai Cop" with Tim Reynolds.
| 345 | May 11, 2017 | Mayim Bialik, Andy Karl | Ramy Youssef |
Stephen reacts to Donald Trump calling him "a no-talent guy". First Drafts: Mother's Day Cards. Mayim Bialik discusses The Big Bang Theory and her new book, Girling Up: How to Be Strong, Smart and Spectacular. Andy Karl discusses Groundhog Day. Ramy Youssef gives a stand-up performance.
| 346 | May 12, 2017 | Tracy Morgan, Timothy Simons | Dan Auerbach |
Tracy Morgan remembers his years at Saturday Night Live and discusses Staying Alive, his new stand-up special. Timothy Simons discusses Veep. The Big Furry Hat. Dan Auerbach performs "Shine On Me" from his album Waiting on a Song.
| 347 | May 15, 2017 | Danny McBride, Jane Krakowski | Metallica |
President Donald Trump's advice for graduates. Danny McBride discusses Alien: Covenant. Jane Krakowski discusses Unbreakable Kimmy Schmidt. Metallica performs "Now That We're Dead" from their album Hardwired... to Self-Destruct.
| 348 | May 16, 2017 | Gina Rodriguez, Ben Falcone | The Jesus and Mary Chain |
Big Questions with Even Bigger Stars (with Brad Pitt). Gina Rodriguez discusses Jane the Virgin. Ben Falcone discusses his new book, Being a Dad Is Weird. The Jesus and Mary Chain performs "The Two of Us" from their album Damage and Joy, featuring Sky Ferreira.
| 349 | May 17, 2017 | Julie Chen, Matt Walsh, David Ortiz | N/A |
Stephen Colbert's Midnight Confessions. Julie Chen discusses The Talk and Big Brother. Matt Walsh discusses Veep. David Ortiz discusses his new book, Papi: My Story.
| 350 | May 18, 2017 | Ricky Gervais, Corey Hawkins | The xx |
Late Show Teen Secrets. Ricky Gervais discusses his "Humanity" tour. Corey Hawkins discusses Six Degrees of Separation. The xx perform "I Dare You" from their album I See You.
| 351 | May 19, 2017 | Jennifer Garner, Demetri Martin, Paula Poundstone | N/A |
Brain Fight with Tuck Buckford. Jennifer Garner remembers babysitting for Stephen's children in the 90's, and discusses Wakefield. Demetri Martin discusses Dean. Paula Poundstone discusses Wait Wait... Don't Tell Me! and her new book, The Totally Unscientific Study of the Search for Human Happiness.
| 352 | May 22, 2017 | Rachel Maddow, Ben Platt | Ben Platt |
The Trump Postcards. Rachel Maddow discusses The Rachel Maddow Show and recent politics. Ben Platt discusses Dear Evan Hansen and performs "For Forever".
| 353 | May 23, 2017 | Kevin Spacey, Terry Crews, Rob Huebel | N/A |
Galino & Farnes: The Attorney Guys. Stephen acknowledges the terrorist attack after Ariana Grande's concert in Manchester Arena. Kevin Spacey discusses House of Cards, Clarence Darrow and the Tony Awards. Terry Crews discusses his lifestyle and his new line of furniture. Rob Huebel discusses Baywatch.
| 354 | May 24, 2017 | Robin Wright, Hannibal Buress | Paul Simon with Bill Frisell |
Paul Simon performs an updated version of "The 59th Street Bridge Song" with Stephen. Robin Wright discusses Wonder Woman and House of Cards. Hannibal Buress discusses his first years in comedy and Baywatch. Simon discusses his upcoming tour and performs "Questions for the Angels" with Bill Frisell.
| 355 | May 25, 2017 | Oscar Isaac, Laurie Metcalf, April Ryan | N/A |
The Big Furry Hat. Oscar Isaac discusses Star Wars: The Last Jedi, Carrie Fisher's legacy and Hamlet. Laurie Metcalf discusses Roseanne and A Doll's House, Part 2. The Late Show New Vocal Warm-ups (with Laurie Metcalf). April Ryan discusses her work as a member of the White House press corps.
| 356 | May 26, 2017 | Gordon Ramsay, David Sedaris | Pixies |
The Trump Postcards – Part Due. Late Show First Drafts: Graduation Day Cards. Gordon Ramsay discusses The F Word. Stephen makes a PBJ sandwich and has Ramsay yelling at him. David Sedaris discusses his collection of diaries, Theft By Finding. Pixies perform "Tenement Song" from their album Head Carrier.

=== June ===
| No. | Original release date | Guest(s) | Musical/entertainment guest(s) |
|---|---|---|---|
| 357 | June 5, 2017 | Kevin Hart, Ali Wentworth | The War on Drugs |
Kevin Hart discusses the NBA Finals, his new book, I Can't Make This Up: Life Lessons, and his beginnings in comedy. Ali Wentworth discusses Nightcap. The War on Drugs performs "Holding On" from their album A Deeper Understanding.
| 358 | June 6, 2017 | Salma Hayek, Hasan Minhaj | Feist |
An interview with Cartoon Donald Trump. Salma Hayek discusses Beatriz at Dinner. Hasan Minhaj discusses his hosting gig at the White House Correspondents' Dinner and his new comedy special, Homecoming King. Feist performs "Century" from her album Pleasure, with Stephen providing lyrics.
| 359 | June 7, 2017 | Tilda Swinton, Andy Cohen, Jordan Klepper | N/A |
Tilda Swinton discusses Okja and her acting career. Andy Cohen discusses Love Connection and his new book, Superficial: More Adventures from the Andy Cohen Diaries. Jordan Klepper discusses his work as a correspondent for The Daily Show and his new comedy special, Jordan Klepper Solves Guns.
| 360 | June 8, 2017 | John Mulaney, Richard Branson | Halsey |
John Mulaney discusses his new comedy album, The Comeback Kid. Richard Branson discusses Virgin Orbit and World Oceans Day. Halsey performs a medley of songs ("Now or Never" and "Eyes Closed") from her album Hopeless Fountain Kingdom.
| 361 | June 9, 2017 | Jim Gaffigan, Anna Chlumsky | Louie Anderson |
Galino & Farnes. Jim Gaffigan discusses his new comedy album, Cinco. Anna Chlumsky discusses Veep. Louie Anderson gives a stand-up performance and discusses Baskets.
| 362 | June 12, 2017 | Uzo Aduba, T. J. Miller, Oliver Stone | N/A |
Uzo Aduba discusses Orange Is the New Black. T. J. Miller discusses his new comedy special, Meticulously Ridiculous. Oliver Stone discusses The Putin Interviews.
| 363 | June 13, 2017 | Olivia Wilde, Eddie Izzard | Nick Cave and the Bad Seeds |
A cameo appearance by Laura Benanti as Melania Trump. Olivia Wilde discusses 1984. Eddie Izzard discusses his new memoir, Believe Me: A Memoir of Love, Death and Jazz Chickens. Nick Cave and the Bad Seeds perform "Rings of Saturn" from their album Skeleton Tree.
| 364 | June 14, 2017 | Trevor Noah, Ilana Glazer, Sam Richardson | N/A |
Stephen acknowledges the Congressional baseball shooting. Trevor Noah discusses recent politics and his new book, Born a Crime. Ilana Glazer discusses Rough Night. Sam Richardson discusses Veep.
| 365 | June 15, 2017 | Milo Ventimiglia, Judy Greer | Keith Alberstadt |
Stephen Colbert's Midnight Confessions. Milo Ventimiglia discusses This Is Us. Judy Greer watches a rejected pilot shot with Stephen in 2002 for the first time and discusses Casual. Keith Alberstadt gives a stand-up performance.
| 366 | June 16, 2017 | Scarlett Johansson, Bill Burr | Fleet Foxes |
A Father's Day Message from the Late Show (with Milo Ventimiglia). First Drafts: Father's Day Cards. Scarlett Johansson discusses Rough Night. Bill Burr discusses F Is for Family. Fleet Foxes perform "Third of May" from their album Crack-Up.
| 367 | June 19, 2017 | Seth Rogen, Kumail Nanjiani | Paul Shaffer and the World's Most Dangerous Band |
Seth Rogen tweets to Donald Trump Jr. with Stephen and discusses Preacher. Kumail Nanjiani discusses The Big Sick. Paul Shaffer discusses his years as David Letterman's sidekick in the old Late Show and performs "Ain't No Mountain High Enough" with Valerie Simpson, with Jon Batiste & Stay Human providing musical accompaniment.
| 368 | June 20, 2017 | Ice Cube, Marc Maron | Jason Isbell and The 400 Unit |
The Big Furry Hat. Ice Cube gives Stephen a rap name and discusses BIG3. Marc Maron discusses WTF with Marc Maron and GLOW. Jason Isbell and The 400 Unit perform "Hope the High Road" from their album The Nashville Sound.
| 369 | June 21, 2017 | Jeffrey Tambor, John Benjamin Hickey | Lake Street Dive |
Stephen presents new items from his own lifestyle brand, Covetton House. Jeffrey Tambor discusses his beginnings in acting, his new memoir, Are You Anybody?, and Transparent. John Benjamin Hickey discusses Six Degrees of Separation. Lake Street Dive performs "Close to Me" from their album Side Pony.
| 370 | June 26, 2017 | Michael Keaton, Zoe Kazan | Tom Shillue |
Stephen Goes to Russia. Michael Keaton discusses Spider-Man: Homecoming. Zoe Kazan discusses The Big Sick. Tom Shillue discusses his days as a correspondent for The Daily Show and his new book, Mean Dads for a Better America.
| 371 | June 27, 2017 | Eric Stonestreet, John McEnroe | Lillie Mae |
Stephen presents new items from his own lifestyle brand, Covetton House. Eric Stonestreet discusses Modern Family. John McEnroe clarifies his remarks on Serena Williams and discusses his new book, But Seriously. Lillie Mae performs "Over the Hill and Through the Woods" from her album Forever and Then Some.
| 372 | June 28, 2017 | Josh Duhamel, Justin Bartha, Brian Greene | N/A |
Josh Duhamel discusses Transformers: The Last Knight. Justin Bartha discusses The Good Fight. Brian Greene discusses the quantum laws of physics and demonstrates quantum levitation.
| 373 | June 29, 2017 | Naomi Watts, Ari Graynor | Swet Shop Boys |
Stephen Colbert's Midnight Confessions. Naomi Watts discusses Gypsy and her acting career. Ari Graynor discusses I'm Dying Up Here. Swet Shop Boys perform "T5" from their album Cashmere.
| 374 | June 30, 2017 | Michael Keaton, John McEnroe | N/A |
Late Show Presents: best moments of the week, including segments with Naomi Watts and Brian Greene. Michael Keaton discusses Spider-Man: Homecoming (new footage from June 26 episode). John McEnroe clarifies his remarks on Serena Williams and discusses his new book, But Seriously (interview rebroadcast from June 27 episode).

=== July ===
| No. | Original release date | Guest(s) | Musical/entertainment guest(s) |
|---|---|---|---|
| 375 | July 10, 2017 | Woody Harrelson, Cobie Smulders | Emmylou Harris & Her Red Dirt Boys |
Woody Harrelson discusses Lost in London and War for the Planet of the Apes. Cobie Smulders discusses Friends from College. Emmylou Harris & Her Red Dirt Boys perform "Pilgrim".
| 376 | July 11, 2017 | Joe Scarborough & Mika Brzezinski, Andy Serkis | Joe Scarborough |
Joe Scarborough & Mika Brzezinski discuss recent politics and Donald Trump's tweets against them. Andy Serkis discusses War for the Planet of the Apes and reads Trump's tweets as Gollum from The Lord of the Rings. Scarborough performs "Monkey House" from his album Mystified.
| 377 | July 12, 2017 | John Oliver, Mike Birbiglia, Michael Showalter | N/A |
John Oliver discusses recent politics and Last Week Tonight. Mike Birbiglia discusses his career in comedy and his tour, "The New One". Michael Showalter discusses The Big Sick and Wet Hot American Summer: Ten Years Later.
| 378 | July 13, 2017 | Ashton Kutcher, Rob Corddry | The New Pornographers |
Late Show Teen Secrets. Ashton Kutcher discusses his investments and The Ranch. Rob Corddry discusses Ballers. The New Pornographers perform "Whiteout Conditions" from their album of the same name.
| 379 | July 14, 2017 | John Oliver, Woody Harrelson | Emmylou Harris & Her Red Dirt Boys |
Stephen Colbert's Midnight Confessions. Late Show Battle of the Presidents: Stephen vs. John Oliver (new footage from July 12 episode). Woody Harrelson discusses Lost in London and War for the Planet of the Apes (interview rebroadcast from July 10 episode). Emmylou Harris & Her Red Dirt Boys perform "Pilgrim" (performance rebroadcast from July 10 episode).
| 380 | July 17, 2017 | Al Gore, Issa Rae | Sufjan Stevens, Nico Muhly, Bryce Dessner & James McAlister |
The Late Show celebrates Russia Week: Stephen hits the streets of Saint Petersburg and appears on Ivan Urgant's late-night talk show. Al Gore discusses An Inconvenient Sequel: Truth to Power. Issa Rae discusses Insecure. Sufjan Stevens, Nico Muhly, Bryce Dessner & James McAlister perform "Mercury" from their album Planetarium.
| 381 | July 18, 2017 | Keegan-Michael Key, Cillian Murphy | N/A |
The Late Show celebrates Russia Week: Stephen hits the streets of Saint Petersburg and goes to the White Nights Festival. Keegan-Michael Key discusses Hamlet and Friends from College. Luther, Barack Obama's anger translator, returns. Cillian Murphy discusses Dunkirk.
| 382 | July 19, 2017 | James McAvoy | Matteo Lane |
The Late Show celebrates Russia Week: Stephen meets with Russian billionaire Mikhail Prokhorov. James McAvoy discusses Atomic Blonde. Matteo Lane gives a stand-up performance.
| 383 | July 20, 2017 | Jason Bateman | Muse |
The Late Show celebrates Russia Week: Stephen explores the infamous Ritz Carlton presidential suite in Russia. Jason Bateman discusses Ozark and takes over as host of the Late Show. Muse performs "Dig Down".
| 384 | July 21, 2017 | Kenneth Branagh, Cara Delevingne | N/A |
Kenneth Branagh stars as Mr. Will, a middle-aged William Shakespeare. The Late Show celebrates Russia Week: Stephen teaches American culture to Russians in Moscow. Branagh discusses Dunkirk. Cara Delevingne discusses Valerian and the City of a Thousand Planets. Late Show Presents: best moments of Russia Week, including segments with Al Gore, Keegan-Michael Key, Issa Rae and Jason Bateman.
| 385 | July 24, 2017 | Paul Bettany, Laura Benanti | Tyler, The Creator |
Paul Bettany discusses Manhunt: Unabomber. Laura Benanti discusses her Melania Trump impression for The Late Show. Tyler, The Creator discusses his career and performs "911" from his album Flower Boy, featuring Steve Lacy.
| 386 | July 25, 2017 | Charlie Rose, Jessica Williams, Max Brooks | N/A |
Charlie Rose discusses his career in journalism, his recovery from mitral valve repair surgery and his Vladimir Putin interviews. Jessica Williams remembers meeting J. K. Rowling and discusses The Incredible Jessica James. Max Brooks discusses his new book, Minecraft: The Island.
| 387 | July 26, 2017 | Michael Moore, Sutton Foster | 6LACK |
Michael Moore discusses recent politics and his new Broadway show, The Terms of My Surrender. Sutton Foster discusses Younger. 6LACK performs "Free" from his album Free 6LACK.
| 388 | July 27, 2017 | Samantha Bee, Gillian Jacobs | Spoon |
Samantha Bee discusses Full Frontal and recent politics. Gillian Jacobs discusses Love. Spoon performs "Can I Sit Next to You" from their album Hot Thoughts.
| 389 | July 28, 2017 | Charlie Rose, Jessica Williams | N/A |
Al Gore's Climate Change Pick-Up Lines. Stephen Colbert's Midnight Confessions. Charlie Rose discusses his career in journalism, his recovery from mitral valve repair surgery and his Vladimir Putin interviews (interview rebroadcast from July 25 episode). Jessica Williams remembers meeting J. K. Rowling (interview rebroadcast from July 25 episode) and Stephen updates the story. Late Show Presents: best moments of the week, including segments with Michael Moore, Tyler, The Creator and Laura Benanti.
| 390 | July 31, 2017 | Matthew McConaughey, Vanessa Bayer | N/A |
Matthew McConaughey discusses The Dark Tower. "Making Matthew's Dream Come True": McConaughey and Stephen recreate "Quad Cities Times", a sketch from Exit 57. Vanessa Bayer shares an e-mail she wrote Stephen in 2004 and he answers back.

=== August ===
| No. | Original release date | Guest(s) | Musical/entertainment guest(s) |
|---|---|---|---|
| 391 | August 1, 2017 | Senator Al Franken, Adam Conover | Randy Newman |
The Purge: White House. Senator Al Franken discusses recent politics and his new book, Giant of the Senate. Adam Conover discusses Adam Ruins Everything. Randy Newman performs "Putin" from his album Dark Matter.
| 392 | August 2, 2017 | Dave Chappelle, James Van Der Beek, Joe Walsh | N/A |
Dave Chappelle celebrates his 30th anniversary in comedy, discusses his residency at Radio City Music Hall and updates his "Give Trump a Chance" statement. James Van Der Beek discusses What Would Diplo Do?. Joe Walsh discusses his new non-profit Veterans organization, VetsAid.
| 393 | August 3, 2017 | Anthony Mackie, Elizabeth Olsen | Arcade Fire |
A new poem for the Statue of Liberty. Anthony Mackie discusses Detroit. Elizabeth Olsen discusses Wind River. Arcade Fire performs "Everything Now" from their album of the same name.
| 394 | August 4, 2017 | Senator Al Franken | Joe Walsh |
Stephen Colbert's Midnight Confessions. Senator Al Franken discusses recent politics and his new book, Giant of the Senate (interview rebroadcast from August 1 episode). Late Show Presents: best moments of the week, including segments with Dave Chappelle, Matthew McConaughey, James Van Der Beek and Elizabeth Olsen. Joe Walsh performs "Life's Been Good" from his album But Seriously, Folks..., with Jon Batiste and Stay Human providing musical accompaniment (new footage from August 2 episode).
| 395 | August 7, 2017 | Laura Dern, Leah Remini | Trombone Shorty |
The Late Show's "WTF Is Up With Millennials?" Laura Dern discusses Star Wars: The Last Jedi and Big Little Lies. Leah Remini discusses Scientology and the Aftermath and Kevin Can Wait. Trombone Shorty performs "Here Come the Girls" from his album Parking Lot Symphony, with Jon Batiste providing musical accompaniment.
| 396 | August 8, 2017 | Christoph Waltz, Chris O'Dowd, Sean Evans | N/A |
An anchor from the BBC could not fake interest. Christoph Waltz discusses Tulip Fever and Austrian traditions. Chris O'Dowd discusses Get Shorty. Sean Evans and Stephen do a "Hot Ones" interview, eating progressively spicier chicken wings.
| 397 | August 9, 2017 | Robert Pattinson, David Tennant, Niecy Nash | N/A |
Hallmark's Trump Inspired Greeting Cards. Robert Pattinson discusses Good Time. David Tennant discusses Doctor Who, Broadchurch and DuckTales, and reads quotes as Scrooge McDuck. Niecy Nash discusses Claws.
| 398 | August 10, 2017 | Millie Bobby Brown, Jim Jefferies | Zeshan B |
The Big Furry Hat. Millie Bobby Brown discusses Stranger Things. Jim Jefferies discusses The Jim Jefferies Show. Zeshan B performs "Cryin' in the Streets" from his album Vetted.
| 399 | August 11, 2017 | Dave Chappelle, Chris O'Dowd | N/A |
A Song of Leaks & Spoilers. Stephen Colbert's Midnight Confessions. Dave Chappelle celebrates his 30th anniversary in comedy, discusses his residency at Radio City Music Hall and updates his "Give Trump a Chance" statement (interview rebroadcast from August 2 episode). Chris O'Dowd discusses Get Shorty (interview rebroadcast from August 8 episode). Late Show Presents: best moments of the week, including segments with Millie Bobby Brown, Niecy Nash and Sean Evans.
| 400 | August 14, 2017 | Anthony Scaramucci, Bob Odenkirk | Liam Gallagher |
Stephen acknowledges the events that occurred on Charlottesville, Virginia. Anthony Scaramucci discusses President Trump's response to the events in Charlottesville and his tenure as White House Communications Director. Bob Odenkirk discusses Better Call Saul. Odenkirk's son gets caught colluding with Russians. Liam Gallagher performs "For What It's Worth" from his album As You Were.
| 401 | August 15, 2017 | Daniel Craig, Tiffany Haddish | Blackberry Smoke |
Daniel Craig confirms his involvement in Bond 25; he also discusses Logan Lucky and his cameo as a stormtrooper in Star Wars: The Force Awakens. Tiffany Haddish discusses Girls Trip and her new comedy special, She Ready! From the Hood to Hollywood. Blackberry Smoke performs "Waiting for the Thunder" from their album Like an Arrow.
| 402 | August 16, 2017 | Ellie Kemper, Andrew Dice Clay, Peter Serafinowicz | N/A |
Rescue Dog Rescue with Ellie Kemper. Ellie Kemper discusses Unbreakable Kimmy Schmidt and performs a ballad inspired by her baby's toy. Andrew Dice Clay discusses Dice. Peter Serafinowicz discusses his redubs for the Sassy Trump YouTube video series and The Tick.
| 403 | August 17, 2017 | John Dickerson, Michael Rapaport | Grizzly Bear |
Stephen acknowledges the terrorist attacks in Barcelona, Spain. John Dickerson discusses Face the Nation and recent politics. Michael Rapaport discusses his new book, This Book Has Balls and Atypical. Grizzly Bear performs "Mourning Sound" from their album Painted Ruins.
| 404 | August 18, 2017 | Anthony Scaramucci, Tiffany Haddish | N/A |
Stephen announces his new book. Stephen Colbert's Midnight Confessions. Anthony Scaramucci discusses President Trump's response to the events in Charlottesville and his tenure as White House Communications Director (interview rebroadcast from August 14 episode). Tiffany Haddish discusses Girls Trip and her new comedy special, She Ready! From the Hood to Hollywood (interview rebroadcast from August 15 episode). Late Show Presents: best moments of the week, including segments with John Dickerson, Ellie Kemper, Daniel Craig and Michael Rapaport.

=== September ===
| No. | Original release date | Guest(s) | Musical/entertainment guest(s) |
|---|---|---|---|
| 405 | September 5, 2017 | Maggie Gyllenhaal, Graham Norton | Lukas Nelson & Promise of the Real |
Stephen acknowledges the aftermath of Hurricane Harvey in Houston. Maggie Gyllenhaal discusses The Deuce. Graham Norton discusses The Graham Norton Show and his new book, Holding. Lukas Nelson & Promise of the Real perform "Find Yourself" from their eponymous album.
| 406 | September 6, 2017 | Liev Schreiber, Joe Buck, Sonequa Martin-Green | N/A |
Sheila E. sits in with the band and provides musical accompaniment. Liev Schreiber discusses Ray Donovan. Joe Buck discusses his career in broadcasting and his new book, Lucky #######. Sonequa Martin-Green discusses Star Trek: Discovery.
| 407 | September 7, 2017 | Senator Bernie Sanders, Caitriona Balfe | The National |
Senator Bernie Sanders discusses recent politics and his new book, Guide to Political Revolution. Caitriona Balfe discusses Outlander. The National performs "Day I Die" from their album Sleep Well Beast.
| 408 | September 8, 2017 | Jessica Biel, Sonequa Martin-Green | N/A |
Stephen acknowledges the impact of Hurricane Irma in Florida. Stephen Colbert's Midnight Confessions. Jessica Biel discusses The Sinner. Sonequa Martin-Green discusses Star Trek: Discovery (new footage from September 6 episode). Late Show Presents: best moments of the week, including segments with Senator Bernie Sanders, Maggie Gyllenhaal, Graham Norton and Liev Schreiber.
| Special | September 18, 2017 | Second Anniversary Special | N/A |
Backstage at the 69th Emmy Awards, Stephen presents a selection of his favorite moments from the last two years, including segments with Oprah Winfrey, Jessica Alba, Daniel Craig, Tom Hanks, Emily Blunt, John Krasinski, Jon Stewart, Dave Chappelle, Robert De Niro, Anthony Scaramucci, Michelle Obama, Russell Crowe & Ryan Gosling and Congressman John Lewis. Best flirts with Jeff Daniels, Tyler, The Creator, Helen Mirren, Andrew Garfield, Sally Field, Nick Kroll, Tiffany Haddish and Allison Janney. Best Trump impressions with Alec Baldwin, Anthony Atamanuik, Peter Serafinowicz, Andy Serkis and Laura Benanti. Best comedy bits with Craig, Hanks, Leslie Mann, Stewart, Bruce Willis, Jude Law, Brad Pitt, Scarlett Johansson, Will Smith, Samantha Bee, John Oliver, Ed Helms, Rob Corddry and Michelle & Barack Obama. Best songs with James Corden, Paul Simon, Run the Jewels, Jack Black, Steve Carell, Lin-Manuel Miranda, Steve Martin and Michael Stipe & James Franco. Best "outside moments", including Stephen taking the MBTI and visiting NASA, Wrigley Field, New Orleans, Russia (with Mikhail Prokhorov), the Democratic National Convention, the Butterball headquarters, the Ringling Bros. and Barnum & Bailey Circus and H&R Block.
| 409 | September 19, 2017 | Hillary Clinton, Emma Stone | N/A |
Hillary Clinton discusses recent politics and her new book, What Happened. Emma Stone discusses Battle of the Sexes. Late Show Soft Porn.
| 410 | September 20, 2017 | Jeff Bridges, Senator Jeff Flake | Miguel |
Stephen acknowledges the impact of Hurricane Maria in Puerto Rico and earthquakes in Mexico. Jeff Bridges discusses Kingsman: The Golden Circle and shows Stephen how to relax with clay. Senator Jeff Flake discusses the Graham-Cassidy bill and his new book, Conscience of a Conservative. Miguel performs "Sky Walker" from his album War & Leisure.
| 411 | September 21, 2017 | Jim Parsons, Pamela Adlon | The Killers |
Now That's What I Call Collusion! Jim Parsons discusses Young Sheldon. Pamela Adlon discusses Better Things. The Killers perform "The Man" from their album Wonderful Wonderful.
| 412 | September 22, 2017 | Bobby Moynihan, Tatiana Maslany | N/A |
After Lawrence O'Donnell's leaked meltdown tape, Stephen releases his own. Stephen Colbert's Midnight Confessions, including a confession by Hillary Clinton (new footage from September 19 episode). Bobby Moynihan discusses his tenure in Saturday Night Live and Me, Myself & I. Tatiana Maslany discusses Stronger and sings "Heaven On Their Minds" from Jesus Christ Superstar with Stephen. Late Show Presents: best moments of the week, including segments with Clinton, Emma Stone, Jeff Bridges and Pamela Adlon.
| 413 | September 25, 2017 | Sterling K. Brown, Chance the Rapper | Chance the Rapper |
Sterling K. Brown discusses This Is Us and Marshall. Chance the Rapper discusses his work with Chicago Public Schools and his beliefs, and performs a new unreleased song with Daniel Caesar.
| 414 | September 26, 2017 | Sofía Vergara, David Boreanaz, Ken Burns | N/A |
Sofía Vergara discusses EBY, her new line of underwear. David Boreanaz discusses SEAL Team. Ken Burns discusses The Vietnam War.
| 415 | September 27, 2017 | Nick Kroll, Michael Bloomberg | Tim & Eric |
Late Show Family Meeting with Nick Kroll. Kroll discusses Big Mouth. Kroll and Stephen launch the hashtag "#PuberMe" in an effort to raise money for Puerto Rico relief. Michael Bloomberg discusses recent politics and his new book, Climate of Hope. Tim Heidecker and Eric Wareheim discuss Bedtime Stories.
| 416 | September 28, 2017 | Steve Martin, Mark Feuerstein | Steve Martin & The Steep Canyon Rangers |
Stephen becomes Steven Seagal. Hashtag #PuberMe: celebrities tweet awkward puberty photos of themselves in an effort to raise money for Puerto Rico relief. Steve Martin discusses The Long-Awaited Album, his new album with The Steep Canyon Rangers. Mark Feuerstein discusses 9JKL. Martin & The Steep Canyon Rangers perform "Caroline".
| 417 | September 29, 2017 | Jerry Seinfeld | N/A |
Hashtag #PuberMe: celebrities tweet awkward puberty photos of themselves in an effort to raise money for Puerto Rico relief. Jerry Seinfeld discusses Jerry Before Seinfeld, his new comedy special. Stephen Colbert's Midnight Confessions. Late Show Presents: best moments of the week, including segments with Sofía Vergara, Nick Kroll and Chance the Rapper.

=== October ===
| No. | Original release date | Guest(s) | Musical/entertainment guest(s) |
|---|---|---|---|
| 418 | October 2, 2017 | Pierce Brosnan, Jason Alexander, Ta-Nehisi Coates | N/A |
Stephen acknowledges the mass shooting in Las Vegas. Hashtag #PuberMe: celebrities tweet awkward puberty photos of themselves in an effort to raise money for Puerto Rico relief. Pierce Brosnan discusses The Foreigner. Jason Alexander discusses Hit the Road. Ta-Nehisi Coates discusses the protests happening in the NFL and his new book, We Were Eight Years in Power.
| 419 | October 3, 2017 | Michael Weatherly, Natasha Leggero | Paul Weller |
Hashtag #PuberMe: celebrities tweet awkward puberty photos of themselves in an effort to raise money for Puerto Rico relief (special appearance by Neil deGrasse Tyson). Michael Weatherly discusses Bull. Natasha Leggero discusses Dice. Weatherly and Leggero also show their own awkward puberty photos. Paul Weller performs "Woo Sé Mama" from his album A Kind Revolution.
| 420 | October 4, 2017 | Kerry Washington, Russell Brand | St. Vincent |
Hashtag #PuberMe: celebrities tweet awkward puberty photos of themselves in an effort to raise money for Puerto Rico relief. Kerry Washington discusses Scandal. Russell Brand discusses his new book, Recovery: Freedom from Our Addictions. St. Vincent performs "New York" from her album Masseduction.
| 421 | October 5, 2017 | Morgan Freeman, Grace Gummer | N/A |
Hashtag #PuberMe: celebrities tweet awkward puberty photos of themselves in an effort to raise money for Puerto Rico relief (special appearance by Lin-Manuel Miranda); Stephen and Nick Kroll announce a $1 million donation. Morgan Freeman discusses Madam Secretary and The Story of Us. Grace Gummer discusses Mr. Robot.
| 422 | October 6, 2017 | Kathy Bates | Nathan Macintosh |
Donald Trump's pick-up lines in the '90s. Supreme Genetics. Kathy Bates discusses Disjointed. Nathan MacIntosh gives a stand-up performance. Late Show Presents: best moments of the week, including segments with Morgan Freeman, Kerry Washington, Russell Brand, Neil deGrasse Tyson and Lin-Manuel Miranda.
| 423 | October 9, 2017 | Jackie Chan, Bob Schieffer | N/A |
Stephen Colbert's interview of Mike Huckabee's interview of President Trump. Jon Stewart makes a cameo appearance, attempting to give President Trump "equal time". Trombone Shorty sits in with the band and provides musical accompaniment. Jackie Chan discusses The Foreigner and confirms the development of Rush Hour 4. Bob Schieffer discusses his new book, Overload. Piano-1-O-Fun with Jon Batiste: New Orleans.
| 424 | October 10, 2017 | Tracee Ellis Ross, Luke Evans | Jade Bird |
Stephen Colbert's Cyborgasm. Tracee Ellis Ross discusses Black-ish. Luke Evans discusses Professor Marston and the Wonder Women. Jade Bird performs "Cathedral" from her album Something American.
| 425 | October 11, 2017 | Andrew Garfield, Tracey Ullman | Wolf Parade |
Andrew Garfield discusses Breathe. Tracey Ullman discusses Tracey Ullman's Show. Wolf Parade performs "Valley Boy" from their album Cry Cry Cry.
| 426 | October 12, 2017 | Bill Murray, Claire Foy | Bill Murray with Jan Vogler & Friends |
Stephen Colbert's interview of Sean Hannity's interview of President Trump. Bill Murray discusses New Worlds, his new album with Jan Vogler. Claire Foy discusses The Crown and Breathe. Bill Murray, Jan Vogler & Friends perform a medley of songs from West Side Story, included in the album.
| 427 | October 13, 2017 | Conan O'Brien, Tig Notaro | N/A |
President Trump and Rex Tillerson enter the Thunderdome. Potential border walls. Conan O'Brien discusses his career in late night, Conan on the road, and his special week of shows in New York. Tig Notaro discusses One Mississippi.
| 428 | October 23, 2017 | Anna Faris, Amy Sedaris | Tyminski |
Stephen Colbert's interview of Maria Bartiromo's interview of President Trump. The O'Reilly Factors. Anna Faris discusses her new book, Unqualified. Amy Sedaris discusses At Home with Amy Sedaris. Tyminski performs "Southern Gothic" from his album of the same name.
| 429 | October 24, 2017 | Jake Tapper, Shemar Moore | Khalid |
Cork a Sock in It. Jake Tapper discusses recent politics. Shemar Moore discusses S.W.A.T.. Khalid performs "Young Dumb & Broke" from his album American Teen.
| 430 | October 25, 2017 | Hugh Laurie, Gretchen Carlson | Adam Savage & Michael Stevens |
Skeletons in the Cabinet. Hugh Laurie discusses Chance. Gretchen Carlson discusses her new book, Be Fierce. Adam Savage & Michael Stevens perform a song from their new show, Brain Candy Live!.
| 431 | October 26, 2017 | Julianne Moore, Jermaine Fowler | Fleet Foxes |
Stephen Colbert's interview of Lou Dobbs's interview of President Trump. Stephen Colbert's Midnight Confessions. Julianne Moore discusses Suburbicon. Jermaine Fowler discusses Superior Donuts. Fleet Foxes performs "Fool's Errand" from their album Crack-Up.
| 432 | October 27, 2017 | Dr. Phil McGraw, Captain Scott Kelly | N/A |
Russian Roundup. Stephen's own lifestyle brand, Covetton House, gets its own magazine. Dr. Phil McGraw discusses sex addictions (inspired by the Harvey Weinstein case) and fighting a bully. The Late Show Halloween Wiggle, featuring Run the Jewels. Captain Scott Kelly discusses his year-long mission for the NASA and his new book, Endurance.
| 433 | October 30, 2017 | Billy Eichner, Anna Camp | Weezer |
Rescue Dog Rescue with Billy Eichner. Billy Eichner discusses American Horror Story: Cult and plays "Hocus Pocus, Trump's White House or Both?" with Stephen. Anna Camp discusses Good Girls Revolt and Time and the Conways. Weezer performs "Happy Hour" from their album Pacific Daydream.
| 434 | October 31, 2017 | Mark Ruffalo, Chris Matthews, Gilbert Gottfried | N/A |
Stephen acknowledges the terrorist attack in Lower Manhattan. Thundercat sits in with the band and provides musical accompaniment. Mark Ruffalo discusses Thor: Ragnarok. Chris Matthews discusses recent politics and his new book, Bobby Kennedy: A Raging Spirit. Gilbert Gottfried discusses Gilbert.

=== November ===
| No. | Original release date | Guest(s) | Musical/entertainment guest(s) |
|---|---|---|---|
| 435 | November 1, 2017 | Nicole Kidman, Jonathan Groff | N/A |
Rugs: A Public Service Announcement. Big Questions with Even Bigger Stars (with Nicole Kidman). Nicole Kidman discusses Big Little Lies and The Killing of a Sacred Deer. Jonathan Groff discusses Hamilton and Mindhunter. Jonathan Groff and Stephen present Mindhunter: The Musical. Whitaker Media Rights Holding Company LLC World.
| 436 | November 2, 2017 | Whoopi Goldberg, Kathryn Hahn | Courtney Barnett & Kurt Vile |
Spain't Misbehaving. Whoopi Goldberg discusses her love for holidays, recent politics and sexual abuse scandals, and her new line of sweaters. Kathryn Hahn discusses A Bad Moms Christmas. Courtney Barnett & Kurt Vile perform "Over Everything" from their album Lotta Sea Lice.
| 437 | November 3, 2017 | Ronan Farrow, Walter Isaacson | Kelsea Ballerini |
John Kelly's Asia Trip Itinerary. The "Colbert Emoji" is finally online. Ronan Farrow discusses his investigative report into the Harvey Weinstein sexual abuse allegations. Marvel's next breakout superhero: "Street Vendor" (starring Zach Cherry). Walter Isaacson discusses his new book, Leonardo Da Vinci. Kelsea Ballerini performs "I Hate Love Songs" from her album Unapologetically.
| 438 | November 6, 2017 | Josh Gad, Lawrence O'Donnell, Derek DelGaudio | N/A |
Stephen acknowledges the shooting in Sutherland Springs. Josh Gad discusses Murder on the Orient Express. Lawrence O'Donnell discusses his new book, Playing with Fire. Derek DelGaudio discusses In & Of Itself.
| 439 | November 7, 2017 | Jason Segel, Jeff Fager & Lesley Stahl | Mavis Staples |
World premiere of the trailer for The Post. Jason Segel discusses his new book, Otherworld. Jeff Fager & Lesley Stahl discuss 60 Minutes's 50th anniversary and the new book accompanying it, Fifty Years of 60 Minutes. Mavis Staples performs "Build a Bridge" from her album If All I Was Was Black, with Jeff Tweedy, Jon Batiste and Louis Cato providing musical accompaniment.
| 440 | November 8, 2017 | Norman Reedus, Sean Astin | Pat McGann |
Sean Astin is Paul Manafort in House Arrest. Jon Stewart reveals Stephen's prize in Night of Too Many Stars. Norman Reedus discusses Ride. Sean Astin discusses Stranger Things. Pat McGann gives a stand-up performance.
| 441 | November 9, 2017 | William H. Macy, Jay Pharoah (Note: Louis C.K. was originally scheduled to appear on this date, but canceled hours before ahead of a New York Times story where five women accused him of sexual misconduct, which C.K. later confirmed to be true. Macy was brought in as a last-minute replacement.) | Rationale |
Stephen Colbert's Cyborgasm: Sex Robot Edition. William H. Macy discusses Shameless. Jay Pharaoh discusses White Famous. Rationale performs "Fuel to the Fire" from his eponymous album.
| 442 | November 10, 2017 | John Mulaney, Jason Segel | N/A |
The Trump Postcards: Asia Edition. There Are Too Many "Bad" Movies (with appearances from Keegan-Michael Key, Ellie Kemper, Jessica Williams, Andy Serkis, Chris O'Dowd and Bob Odenkirk). John Mulaney discusses Kid Gorgeous. The Late Show Presents: Maybe Coming Soon, with Jason Segel (new footage from November 7 episode). Late Show Presents: best moments of the week, including segments with Lawrence O'Donnell, Jay Pharaoh, Sean Astin and Jon Stewart.
| 443 | November 13, 2017 | Joe Biden, Elton John | Elton John |
Joe Biden discusses recent politics, including the events that occurred on Charlottesville, Virginia, and finding a way through grief; he also discusses his new book, Promise Me, Dad. Elton John discusses his musical career and Diamonds, his new music box set; he also performs "Crocodile Rock" and "I'm Still Standing".
| 444 | November 14, 2017 | Tyler Perry, Anthony Atamanuik, John Avlon | N/A |
Tyler Perry discusses his new book, Higher Is Waiting, and Backseat. Anthony Atamaniuk discusses I Came Up with Christmas: A President Show Christmas, the Christmas special for The President Show. John Avlon discusses his new book, Washington's Farewell.
| 445 | November 15, 2017 | Jordan Peele, Alia Shawkat | Paul Mecurio |
Stephen takes issue with the latest "Sexiest Man Alive" issue. Stephen Colbert's Bench Warmers. Jordan Peele discusses Get Out. Alia Shawkat discusses Arrested Development and Search Party. Paul Mecurio gives a stand-up performance.
| 446 | November 16, 2017 | Ben Affleck, Greta Gerwig | Dead & Company |
Ben Affleck discusses Justice League, the upcoming 20th anniversary of Good Will Hunting and recent sexual harassment accusations in Hollywood. Greta Gerwig discusses Lady Bird. Dead & Company perform "Jack Straw".
| 447 | November 17, 2017 | Norah O'Donnell | Dead & Company |
Go Fund Yourself. Norah O'Donnell discusses CBS This Morning. Late Show Presents: best moments of the week, including segments with Alia Shawkat, Joe Biden and Jordan Peele. Dead & Company perform "Uncle John's Band".
| 448 | November 20, 2017 | Senator Elizabeth Warren, Desus & Mero | Vic Mensa |
Senator Elizabeth Warren discusses recent politics and recent sexual harassment accusations in the country. Desus & Mero discuss their late-night show on Viceland. Vic Mensa performs "We Could Be Free" from his album The Autobiography.
| 449 | November 21, 2017 | Gayle King, Daveed Diggs | Gregory Porter |
Gayle King discusses the recent allegations of sexual misconduct against Charlie Rose and shares some of "Oprah's Favorite Things". Daveed Diggs discusses Wonder. Gregory Porter performs a medley of "Mona Lisa" and "L-O-V-E" from his album Nat King Cole & Me.
| 450 | November 22, 2017 | John Leguizamo | Elton John |
Happy Thanksgiving (featuring Tony Robbins). The Big Furry Hat. John Leguizamo discusses Latin History for Morons. The Late Show Presents: Thanksgiving Turkey Tips with Our Friends at Butterball. The Late Show Presents: Thanksgiving Tips. Elton John performs "Bennie and the Jets".
| 451 | November 29, 2017 | Justin Timberlake, Carmen Yulín Cruz | N/A |
Big Questions with Even Bigger Stars (with Justin Timberlake). Justin Timberlake discusses his upcoming gig at the Super Bowl LII halftime show and Wonder Wheel. Carmen Yulín Cruz, Mayor of San Juan, discusses the current situation in Puerto Rico after Hurricane Maria.
| 452 | November 30, 2017 | Kate Winslet | Wolf Alice |
Michael Batiste, Jon's father, sits in with the band and provides musical accompaniment. A cameo appearance by Laura Benanti as Melania Trump. Kate Winslet discusses her career, Wonder Wheel and the upcoming 20th anniversary of Titanic. Wolf Alice performs "Sadboy" from their album Visions of a Life.

=== December ===
| No. | Original release date | Guest(s) | Musical/entertainment guest(s) |
|---|---|---|---|
| 453 | December 1, 2017 | Carol Burnett, Lewis Black | N/A |
Michael Batiste, Jon's father, sits in with the band and provides musical accompaniment. Stephen Colbert's Midnight Confessions. Carol Burnett discusses the upcoming 50th anniversary of The Carol Burnett Show and her new book, In Such Good Company. Lewis Black discusses recent politics and sexual harassment accusations, and his new comedy tour, Joke's on US.
| 454 | December 4, 2017 | Billy Bush, Gwendoline Christie | N/A |
Holiday Collusion Season. Galino & Farnes: The Attorney Guys. Billy Bush confirms the authenticity of the Access Hollywood bus tape and discusses what happened with his career because of it. Gwendoline Christie discusses Star Wars: The Last Jedi. A The Late Show Holiday Classic (cameo appearance by Liam Neeson).
| 455 | December 5, 2017 | Saoirse Ronan, Van Jones, Michelle Wolf | N/A |
Hallmark Cards: The Roy Moore Collection. Saoirse Ronan discusses Lady Bird. Van Jones discusses recent politics and his new book, Beyond the Messy Truth. Michelle Wolf discusses her stand-up special, Nice Lady.
| 456 | December 6, 2017 | Ed Helms, Christopher Jackson | Bleachers |
Stephen presents new items from his own lifestyle brand, Covetton House. Ed Helms discusses The Fake News with Ted Nelms and Father Figures. Christopher Jackson discusses Bull. Christopher Jackson and Stephen present Bull: The Musical. Bleachers performs "I Miss Those Days" from their album Gone Now.
| 457 | December 7, 2017 | Sarah Paulson, John Hodgman | N/A |
Stephen acknowledges the wildfires burning across California. Late Show's American Voices -- and also Faces. Sarah Paulson discusses The Post. Not at the Movies with Gil Peaches (with John Hodgman). John Hodgman discusses his new book, Vacationland.
| 458 | December 8, 2017 | Mark Hamill, Bobby Flay | N/A |
Letters to Santa from The Trumps. Lost Star Wars footage of Luke Skywalker at the Mos Eisley cantina. Mark Hamill discusses Star Wars: The Last Jedi. Bobby Flay discusses his new book, Fit, and prepares some healthy holiday treats. Late Show Presents: best moments of the week, including segments with Michelle Wolf, Billy Bush, Van Jones, John Hodgman, Saoirse Ronan and Sarah Paulson.
| 459 | December 11, 2017 | Matt Damon, Rahm Emanuel | Juanes |
Stephen acknowledges the bombing at the Port Authority Bus Terminal. Matt Damon discusses the 20th anniversary of Good Will Hunting and Downsizing. Rahm Emanuel, mayor of Chicago, discusses recent politics and his podcast, Chicago Stories. Juanes performs "Es Tarde" from his album Mis Planes Son Amarte.
| 460 | December 12, 2017 | Tom Hanks, Katy Tur | N/A |
Mac DeMarco sits in with the band and provides musical accompaniment. Tom Hanks discusses The Post and his new book, Uncommon Type (Some Stories). Katy Tur discusses recent politics and her new book, Unbelievable.
| 461 | December 13, 2017 | Nick Jonas, Dennis Rodman | Jeezy featuring Tory Lanez |
The Late Show Presents: The Legend of Roy Moore. Rescue Dog Rescue with Nick Jonas. Nick Jonas discusses Jumanji: Welcome to the Jungle. Dennis Rodman discusses his relationship with North Korea Supreme Leader Kim Jong-un. Jeezy performs "Like Them" from his album Pressure, featuring Tory Lanez.
| 462 | December 14, 2017 | Adam Driver, John Early | N/A |
Brain Fight with Tuck Buckford. Adam Driver discusses Star Wars: The Last Jedi. John Early discusses Search Party. A special holiday performance: Jon Batiste performs "Winter Wonderland" from his new album, Christmas with Jon Batiste.
| 463 | December 15, 2017 | Jodie Foster, Tom Hanks | N/A |
Clarice Starling probes Hannibal Lecter about President Trump's Russia ties. Jodie Foster discusses her early acting career, the MeToo movement and her directing gig for Black Mirror. Late Show Personal Space with Tom Hanks (new footage from December 12 episode). "Jingle Jingle (Santa Party)", featuring Run the Jewels.
