= DC (Spotify podcasts) =

Spotify podcasts based on DC Comics

Since 2022, Spotify has produced a series of scripted podcasts based on the characters and worlds of DC Comics.

== Production ==
In June 2020, it was announced that Spotify had signed a deal with DC and Warner Bros. to produce scripted podcasts set in the DC Universe.

In September, the first podcast was revealed to be David S. Goyer's Batman Unburied, which released in 2022. The podcast, which stars Winston Duke as the titular Batman, peaked as the No. 1 podcast on Spotify in the U.S. The second podcast, Harley Quinn and The Joker: Sound Mind, was released in early 2023, starring Christina Ricci as Harley Quinn and Billy Magnussen as The Joker.

A season two of Batman Unburied, later titled Batman Unburied: Fallen City, was announced in 2022. The podcast was released in 2024, with Colman Domingo taking over as the voice of Batman. In 2023, a spinoff of the show titled The Riddler: Secrets in the Dark was released. The show focuses on the villain The Riddler, with Hasan Minhaj reprising his role from Batman Unburied.

Future installments are intended to focus on such characters as Superman, Lois Lane, Wonder Woman, Catwoman, Katana, and Batgirl.

== Lists of podcasts ==
- Batman Unburied (2022)
- Harley Quinn and The Joker: Sound Mind (2023)
- The Riddler: Secrets in the Dark (2023)
- Batman Unburied: Fallen City (2024)
