= Batman Unburied =

American superhero podcast series

- Season One poster
- Genre: Superhero
- Language: English

Creative team
- Created by: David S. Goyer
- Written by: David S. Goyer

Cast and voices
- Voices: Winston Duke; Hasan Minhaj; Gina Rodriguez; Colman Domingo

Production
- Production: Phantom Four; Wolf at the Door; Blue Ribbon Content; DC Entertainment; Warner Bros.

Publication
- No. of seasons: 2
- No. of episodes: 18
- Original release: May 3, 2022
- Provider: Spotify

Related
- Website: open.spotify.com/show/3pUWoZ6fC2qA02D3X0CeMb

Batman Unburied is an American superhero audio drama podcast series created by David S. Goyer featuring the DC Comics hero Batman. It is the first of a series of Spotify-produced scripted podcasts based on DC's characters. The second, Harley Quinn and The Joker: Sound Mind, was released in 2023. In this version, Bruce Wayne is a forensic pathologist, his parents lived, and other characters appear with alterations.

In June 2022, a second season of Batman: Unburied was commissioned, in addition to a spin-off entitled The Riddler: Secrets in the Dark, which debuted on October 10, 2023. The second season "Fallen City", released on November 26, 2024.

== Cast ==
- Winston Duke (Season 1) and Colman Domingo (Season 2) as Bruce Wayne
- Gina Rodriguez as Barbara Gordon
- Jason Isaacs as Alfred Pennyworth

=== Season One ===
- Hasan Minhaj as The Riddler
- Lance Reddick as Thomas Wayne
- Sam Witwer as the Harvester
- Emmy Raver-Lampman as Kell
- Jessica Marie Garcia as Renee Montoya
- Jim Pirri as Arnold Flass
- Toks Olagundoye as Martha Wayne
- John Rhys-Davies as Dr. Hunter
- Ashly Burch as Vicki Vale
- Justin and Griffin McElroy as Henchmen
- Travis McElroy as Officer Preslowski
- Blair Bess as Lt. Stan Kitch

=== Season Two (Fallen City) ===
- Morena Baccarin as Allie
- André Holland as Harvey Dent/Two-Face
- Cheech Marin as Jim Gordon
- Tahar Rahim as The Patriarch
- Alan Ruck as Coby Williamson

== Production ==
In September 2020, the podcast was announced.

In July 2021, Winston Duke and Jason Isaacs were announced to star as Bruce Wayne and Alfred Pennyworth, respectively. Hasan Minhaj's casting was announced in September, along with Lance Reddick, Toks Olagundoye, John Rhys-Davies and Ashly Burch.

By October, the final main cast members had been unveiled: Gina Rodriguez, Sam Witwer, Emmy Raver-Lampman, Jessica Marie Garcia and Jim Pirri.

On April 5, 2022, a trailer was revealed. Season 1 was released on May 3.

In June 2022, Batman: Unburied was renewed for a second season. In November 2024, the season was titled "Fallen City", with Duke succeeded as Batman by Colman Domingo, reprising his role from the spinoff series The Riddler: Secrets in the Dark, alongside returning actors Gina Rodriguez and Jason Isaacs. New co-stars include Morena Baccarin as Allie, André Holland as Harvey Dent/Two-Face, Cheech Marin as Jim Gordon, Tahar Rahim as The Patriarch and Alan Ruck as Coby Williamson. The season premiered November 26, 2024.

== Reception ==
Writing in The Guardian, Graeme Virtue described Batman Unburied as "Instead of bright fights in tights, this is a slow-burning psychological thriller. ... Heavy on immersive sound design and (initially, at least) light on action, it is an impressively bleak take on a familiar myth, with the added frisson of the occasional F-bomb." Virtue also noted that in May 2022, the podcast displaced The Joe Rogan Experience as the No. 1 show on Spotify's podcast chart. After the debut of the first two episodes on May 3, 2022, the series topped Spotify's charts in the U.S., Australia, Brazil, France, the U.K., Germany, Italy, Mexico and India. The same week it was No. 2 in Japan. It remained at the top or near the top of the chart throughout its five-week run.

The Los Angeles Times noted that "Due to the lack of visuals, the immersive sound design shines throughout the series. Batman Unburied is chock-full of authentic soundscapes that sound — in the best way possible — eerie and haunting" and that "It's also far more focused on Batman's mental psyche rather than Batman's physical brutality. It replaces action set pieces with mystery, suspense and horror."

== International adaptations ==
On April 5, 2022, Spotify announced that in addition to the main U.S. production, the script would be adapted for eight other countries, each with its own localized cast and production crew. They are set to be released on the same date as the original English language version. In some cases, script details were also adapted for the different language versions. For example, a reference to a Christian parable in English was replaced in the Hindi-language version with a reference to Buddha and Aṅgulimāla.

In these adaptations, the cast of Batman Unburied consists of:

Character	Brazil	Mexico	France	Germany	India (Hindi)	Indonesia	Italy	Japan
	Batman Despertar	Batman Desenterrado	Batman Autopsie	Batman unter Toten	बैटमैन: एक चक्रव्यूह (Batman Ek Chakravyuh)	Batman Bangkit	Batman — un'autopsia	Batman 葬られた真実
Bruce Wayne	Rocco Pitanga	Alfonso Herrera	Dali Benssalah	Murathan Muslu	Amit Sadh	Ario Bayu	Claudio Santamaria	Ryohei Ohtani
The Riddler	Augusto Madeira	Alfonso Borbolla	Laurent Stocker	Tim Oliver Schultz	Sharib Hashmi	Alex Abbad	Michele Bravi	Takanori Iwata
Barbara Gordon	Tainá Müller	Ana Brenda Contreras	Julia Piaton	Lorna Ishema	Shweta Tripathi		Alice Mangione	Nakashima Mika
Alfred Pennyworth	José Rubens Chachá	Carlos Aragón	Sam Karmann	Christoph Maria Herbst	Danish Husain		Dario Bressanini	
Thomas Wayne	Nill Marcondes	Hernán Mendoza	Thibault de Montalembert	Peter Kurth	Rajat Kapoor		Michele La Ginestra	Tsuyoshi Ihara
Harvester	Hugo Bonemer	Noé Hernández	Christophe Montenez	Alexander Scheer	Vrajesh Hirjee		Saverio Raimondo	Ayumu Nakajima
Kell	Camila Pitanga	Zuria Vega	Anaïde Rozam	Maryam Zaree	Anangsha Biswas	Aurelie Moeremans	Beatrice Bruschi	Rena Matsui
Renee Montoya	Carol Abras	Lucía Uribe	Shirine Boutella	Nilam Farooq	Chakori Dwivedi		Fiore Manni	
Arnold Flass			Guy Lecluyse	Frederick Lau	Aseem Hattangadi		Edoardo Ferrario	
Martha Wayne	Adriana Lessa	Úrsula Pruneda	Amira Casar	Meral Perin	Sarika		Maria Grazia Cucinotta	Anju Suzuki
Dr. Hunter	Marcelo Varzea	Gustavo Sánchez Parra	André Dussollier	Justus von Dohnányi	Ashwin Mushran		Nicola Pistoia	Shinya Kote
Vicki Vale	Maria Bopp	Ximena Romo	Ana Girardot	Lavinia Wilson	Pooja Gor		Michela Giraud	

== Spin-off ==
A spin-off of Batman: Unburied, entitled The Riddler: Secrets in the Dark, premiered on October 10, 2023. Hasan Minhaj reprises his role as the Riddler. The cast also includes Colman Domingo (replacing Winston Duke as Batman), Calum Worthy, Hannah Simone, Peyton Crim, Hugh Scott, Bri Giger, Aflamu Johnson and Amy Argyle. Gina Rodriguez, Jim Pirri, Jason Isaacs, and Ashly Burch all reprise their roles from Batman: Unburied.
