= Cornelius Stirk =

DC Comics character

- Cornelius Stirk as depicted in Detective Comics #593 (December 1988). Art by Norm Breyfogle.

Publication information
- Publisher: DC Comics
- First appearance: Detective Comics #592 (November 1988)
- Created by: Alan Grant (writer); Norm Breyfogle (artist)

In-story information
- Species: Metahuman
- Notable aliases: Fear
- Abilities: Can cause fear or hallucinations through telepathy

Cornelius Stirk is a fictional character appearing in the DC Comics. He is a cannibalistic supervillain with the ability to cause fear or hallucinations through telepathy and appears as a recurring adversary of Batman.

== Publication history ==
He first appeared in Detective Comics #592 (November 1988) and was created by Alan Grant and Norm Breyfogle.

== Fictional character biography ==
Stirk is a serial killer who, like fellow Batman villain Scarecrow, uses fear to get to his victims. Stirk has the ability to make other people see him as someone else, allowing him to get close to his victims. He operates under the delusion that he requires the nutrients and hormones from people's hearts to stay alive.

In his first appearance, Stirk is released from Arkham Asylum after being certified as sane. He had been confined since the age of 16 for trying to kill a classmate. After his release, Stirk subsequently stops taking his medication and becomes a serial killer.

Stirk makes a brief cameo in the beginning of the four-part storyline The Last Arkham, where Jeremiah Arkham utilizes more barbaric methods to "cure" him. When Stirk refuses to take his medication, Arkham has two orderlies brutally beat him with billy clubs and forces the medication down his throat.

During the "Knightfall" storyline, Stirk works with the Joker in an attempt to kidnap Commissioner Jim Gordon. However, Stirk tries to kill Gordon rather than kidnap him. Gordon hallucinates that Stirk is actually Batman as Stirk tries to stab him to death. Batman stops Stirk, but Gordon is left terrified.

Stirk later appears during the "Madmen Across the Water" storyline, taking place after his capture but before Arkham Asylum (destroyed by Bane beforehand) is rebuilt. He, along with the likes of Riddler, Poison Ivy, and Amygdala, are instead incarcerated in Blackgate Penitentiary, and play on a softball game against the prison's "normal" criminals.

Stirk makes several more cameos in the "Waxman and the Clown" story arc. He is seen offering to eat human hearts to save on medication and supplies. He later watches the gladiatorial match between fellow inmates Killer Croc and Pinhead, and is released with all the other inmates under Jeremiah Arkham's demand that none of them return to Gotham.

== Powers and abilities ==
Cornelius Stirk can generate a hypnotic aura which allows him to take on any face he chooses, generally a face that people will trust.

== In other media ==
- Cornelius Stirk appears in the Gotham episode "Wrath of the Villains: A Legion of Horribles", portrayed by Kameron Omidian.
- Cornelius Stirk appears in Batman Unburied, voiced by Sam Witwer. This version is a former diener who becomes the serial killer Harvester.
