= Harley Quinn and The Joker: Sound Mind =

American superhero podcast series

- Genre: Superhero
- Language: English

Creative team
- Created by: Eli Horowitz
- Written by: Eli Horowitz
- Directed by: Eli Horowitz

Cast and voices
- Starring: Christina Ricci
- Voices: Christina Ricci; Billy Magnussen; Justin Hartley

Production
- Production: Realm Media; Blue Ribbon Content; DC Entertainment; Warner Bros.; Spotify Studios

Publication
- No. of seasons: 1
- No. of episodes: 7
- Original release: January 31, 2023
- Provider: Spotify

Related
- Website: open.spotify.com/show/0LwynFnRBJBHaZRdkqC9fc

Harley Quinn and The Joker: Sound Mind is an American superhero audio drama podcast series created by Eli Horowitz featuring the DC Comics characters Harley Quinn, The Joker and Batman. It is the second in a series of Spotify podcasts based on DC's characters, the first being Batman Unburied and followed by The Riddler: Secrets in the Dark.

== Premise ==
Harleen Quinzel is a newly graduated psychologist who takes up work at Arkham Asylum, and becomes embroiled with the mysterious Patient J.

== Cast ==
- Christina Ricci as Dr. Harleen Quinzel
- Billy Magnussen as The Joker
- Justin Hartley as Bruce Wayne
- Amy Sedaris as Harleen's Aunt Rose
- Andre Royo as Arnold Wesker/The Ventriloquist
- Stephen Root as Harleen's boss, Grunfeld
- Fred Melamed as Harleen's co-worker Bob
- Mary Holland as Margaret Pye/Magpie
- Elias Koteas as Harleen's father, Nicky Quinzel

== Episodes ==
No.	Title	Original air date
1	"Awful Little World"	January 31, 2023
2	"Child's Play"	January 31, 2023
3	"Trust Fund Wonderboy"	January 31, 2023
4	"Dirk McDongle's Pleasure Palace"	January 31, 2023
5	"Pillow Talk"	January 31, 2023
6	"One Small Bad Thing"	January 31, 2023
7	"Marbles"	January 31, 2023
