= Booze Traveler =

American travel television series

- Genre: Food reality television
- Presented by: Jack Maxwell
- Country of origin: United States
- Original language: English
- No. of seasons: 4
- No. of episodes: 60

Production
- Running time: 43 minutes
- Production company: Travel Channel

Original release
- Network: Travel Channel
- Release: November 24, 2014 – April 23, 2018

Booze Traveler is an American travel television series hosted by Jack Maxwell. The premise involves Maxwell, a native of South Boston, traveling the world to partake in international (and domestic) alcohol-based customs, as well as observe the culture of specific areas in a more general sense. It premiered on Travel Channel on November 24, 2014. Season 1 consisted of 15 episodes, and Season 2 has 16 episodes. Season 3 began airing in December 2016 with 13 episodes. Season 4 began airing in December 2017 with 16 episodes.

== Episodes ==
=== Season 1 ===
No.	Air dates	Location	Premise
1	November 24, 2014	Turkey is Stirring	
2	November 30, 2014	Peru is Magic	
3	December 8, 2014	Spain: Mixed, Not Blended	
4	December 15, 2014	Austria Is Good for You	
5	December 22, 2014	Iceland's Warm Fire	
6	December 29, 2014	Mongolian Road Trip	
7	January 5, 2015	Nepal: A Higher State	
8	January 12, 2015	Japan Uncorked	
9	January 19, 2015	Loopy Lithuania	
10	January 26, 2015	Netherlands: Liquid Courage	
11	February 2, 2015	The Armenian Trail	
12	February 9, 2015	Dead in New Orleans	
13	February 16, 2015	Belize: Paradise Found	
14	February 23, 2015	South Africa: Hidden Gems	
15	March 2, 2015	Tennessee: Red, White and Booze	

=== Season 2 ===
No.	Air dates	Location	Premise
1	September 29, 2015	Greece: The Morning After	
2	October 6, 2015	Sicily: A Family Thing	
3	October 13, 2015	Finland: Sauna and the Midnight Sun	
4	October 20, 2015	Hungary: Aliens Soviets and Gypsies	
5	October 27, 2015	Tanzania: Increase Happy	
6	November 3, 2015	Scotland: Monsters, Men, and the Mac	
7	November 10, 2015	Philippines: Inuman Nature	
8	November 17, 2015	Texas Is Full of It	
9	November 24, 2015	Hawaiian Crush	
10	December 1, 2015	New Zealand	
11	December 8, 2015	Argentina	
12	December 15, 2015	Savannah, GA	
13	December 22, 2015	Guatemala	
14	December 29, 2015	Hong Kong	
15	January 5, 2016	Brazil	
16	January 12, 2016	India	

=== Season 3 ===
No.	Air dates	Location	Premise
1	December 12, 2016	Spirits of Ol' Mexico	
2	December 19, 2016	The Magic of Ireland	
3	January 2, 2017	Florida's Free Spirits	
4	January 9, 2017	A G'day Down Under	
5	January 16, 2017	South Korea: Mind Your Manners	
6	January 23, 2017	Twain's Mighty Mississippi	
7	January 30, 2017	Arak-ing Trip Through Israel	
8	February 6, 2017	Drink in the Zen	
9	February 13, 2017	Colombia: Wayuu Wahoo and the Golden One	
10	February 20, 2017	Legendary Croatia	
11	February 27, 2017	Cuba: Kings of Cocktail	
12	March 6, 2017	Playing the Booze in Portugal	
13	March 13, 2017	The Force of Madagascar	
14	March 20, 2017	Siberia: Ice-olated Spirit	
15	March 27, 2017	German Precision Und Scnapps	
16	April 3, 2017	Last Call of the Wild West	

=== Season 4 ===
No.	Air dates	Location	Premise
1	December 12, 2017	Tahitian Dream	
2	January 1, 2018	Viking in a Bottle	
3	January 8, 2018	The Roarin' Rockies	
4	January 15, 2018	Costa Rica's Pure Life	
5	January 22, 2018	The Common Crown	
6	January 29, 2018	Asia's Hidden Gem	
7	February 5, 2018	Caribbean Rhythm	
8	February 26, 2018	Home is Where the Booze Is	
9	March 5, 2018	L'Arte de Booze	
10	March 12, 2018	Italy: It's Personal	
11	March 19, 2018	Czech Castles and Cocktails	
12	March 26, 2018	Boozy Beginnings Of The Chesapeake Bay	
13	April 2, 2018	Southwest Spirits	
14	April 9, 2018	The End Begins in Chile	
15	April 16, 2018	Michigan's Endless Summer	
16	April 23, 2018	Wet and Wild Pacific Northwest	
