= Hasan Minhaj: Homecoming King =

- Netflix poster by Sam Spratt
- Directed by: Christopher Storer
- Written by: Hasan Minhaj
- Produced by: Michelle Caputo; Shannon Hartman
- Starring: Hasan Minhaj
- Cinematography: Andrew Wehde
- Music by: Ludwig Göransson
- Production companies: Art & Industry
- Release date: 23 May 2017 (Netflix)
- Running time: 72 minutes
- Country: United States
- Language: English

Hasan Minhaj: Homecoming King is a 2017 American stand-up comedy television special written by and starring Hasan Minhaj. It premiered on Netflix on May 23, 2017. Directed by Christopher Storer and filmed in Minhaj's hometown of Davis, California, Homecoming King focuses on Minhaj's experience growing up in an Indian American Muslim family, which he calls "The New Brown America."

The special received critical acclaim, with some calling it the best stand-up comedy special on Netflix. The special was honored with a Peabody Award in 2018. In 2023 The New Yorker reported that the prom story was exaggerated; Minhaj responded that it's based on "emotional truth".

== Synopsis ==
Illustrated with old photos and peppered with Hindi and Urdu phrases, Homecoming King features a central theme of the immigrant experience in the United States, inspired by Minhaj's life as the California-born son of Indian Muslim immigrant parents. In the first half of the show, he discusses his childhood growing up in mostly white Davis, California, where he lived alone with his dad for eight years while his mother was finishing medical school in India. He talks about the pressures of being the child of demanding immigrant parents while at the same time experiencing racism, bullying, and rejection from the outside world. Stories include his mother returning to California with a younger sister he didn't know existed, his family receiving threats and harassment after 9/11, and disapproval from his parents that he was engaged to a Hindu woman. The second half of the show concerns a fictionalized version of his senior prom night and the repercussions, which he claims impacted Minhaj's life until he was hired for The Daily Show.

== Production ==
Homecoming King was filmed January 27, 2017, at the Mondavi Center at Minhaj's alma mater, the University of California, Davis, in his hometown of Davis. He first created the one-man show after being selected by the Sundance Institute's New Frontier Story Lab in 2014. He performed the set at the 2015 Just for Laughs Festival in Montreal before his off-Broadway premiere in October 2015 at the Cherry Lane Theatre in New York City, where it ran for four weeks. He went on to perform the show in more than 40 cities before shooting the special.

Minhaj chose the title Homecoming King to reflect his status as the high school underdog who never went to football games or dances, while also conveying a message of redemption as an adult.

The art director for the show was Sam Spratt, who created multiple paintings depicting Minhaj's life in the style of Norman Rockwell for posters and the website. The stage set contained bright yellows and oranges to reflect Indian culture. Minhaj also teamed up with Swedish composer Ludwig Göransson for the musical elements of the show.

== Reception ==
Homecoming King has received critical acclaim, in particular for Minhaj's ability to engage with both humor and sadness. Dennis Perkins of The A.V. Club graded it an A, writing: "One of Homecoming King's chief pleasures is how expertly Minhaj crafts these anecdotes—his mother’s return, a prom-night revelation, a family trauma, his Daily Show audition—his confident, energetic flow not so much disguising the craft as relishing in the telling, and in the effect it has on his rapt audience." Stav Ziv of Newsweek writes, "In Homecoming King, Minhaj navigates adeptly between humorous and heartfelt, playful and poignant."

Scott Meslow of GQ wrote, "It's been ages since I've seen a comedy special I admired and enjoyed as much as Hasan Minhaj's Homecoming King... Homecoming King sheds light on a different, more personal side of Minhaj's talents, [weaving] a funny, heartbreaking, and intimate narrative built around his most personal experiences."

Lea Palmieri of Decider.com noted Minhaj's skill in relaying the stories of his life, including the painful ones: "Maybe the most impressive aspect of Minhaj's show is how exquisitely he's balanced and timed out his ratios of belly laughs to gut punches. As soon as tears drip down your face from giggling too hard, they're immediately chased by ones caused purely by emotions. Minhaj has crafted his biography into a stage show that is supremely touching, all too real, and way funnier than anything the rest of us have to offer."

=== Accolades ===
Homecoming King was honored with a 2018 Peabody Award for being a "deeply personal memoir — part Richard Pryor, part Spaulding Gray — that covers the struggles of the immigrant experience, encounters with stereotypes and raced expectations, and intergenerational acceptance, while using comedy to invite empathy, caring, and understanding."

=== Accuracy ===
In a September 2023 The New Yorker reported a story involving alleged factual inaccuracies in Minhaj's stories. In the special Minhaj's story involving his claim that her family had been racist toward him and she had rejected him due to his ethnicity was called into question. Minhaj admitted he had fabricated the events presented during the second half of the special including timelines of events. In the piece, it alleges the woman disagreed with Minhaj's version of events and that she and her Indian husband have since been doxxed and threatened due to his show.

On October 26, 2023, Minhaj responded to the reporting in a lengthy piece where he used evidence to counteract the allegations made against him. He described the reporting by Clare Malone of The New Yorker as "needlessly misleading". He also released a statement to The Hollywood Reporter writing, "There were omissions and factual errors in The New Yorker article that misrepresented my life story, so I wanted to give people the context and materials I provided The New Yorker with full transparency". He also released texts and emails with the woman in the story that showed that the woman was not doxxed like the article claimed and that elements of the story did happen.
