= Hasan Minhaj =

American comedian and actor (born 1985)

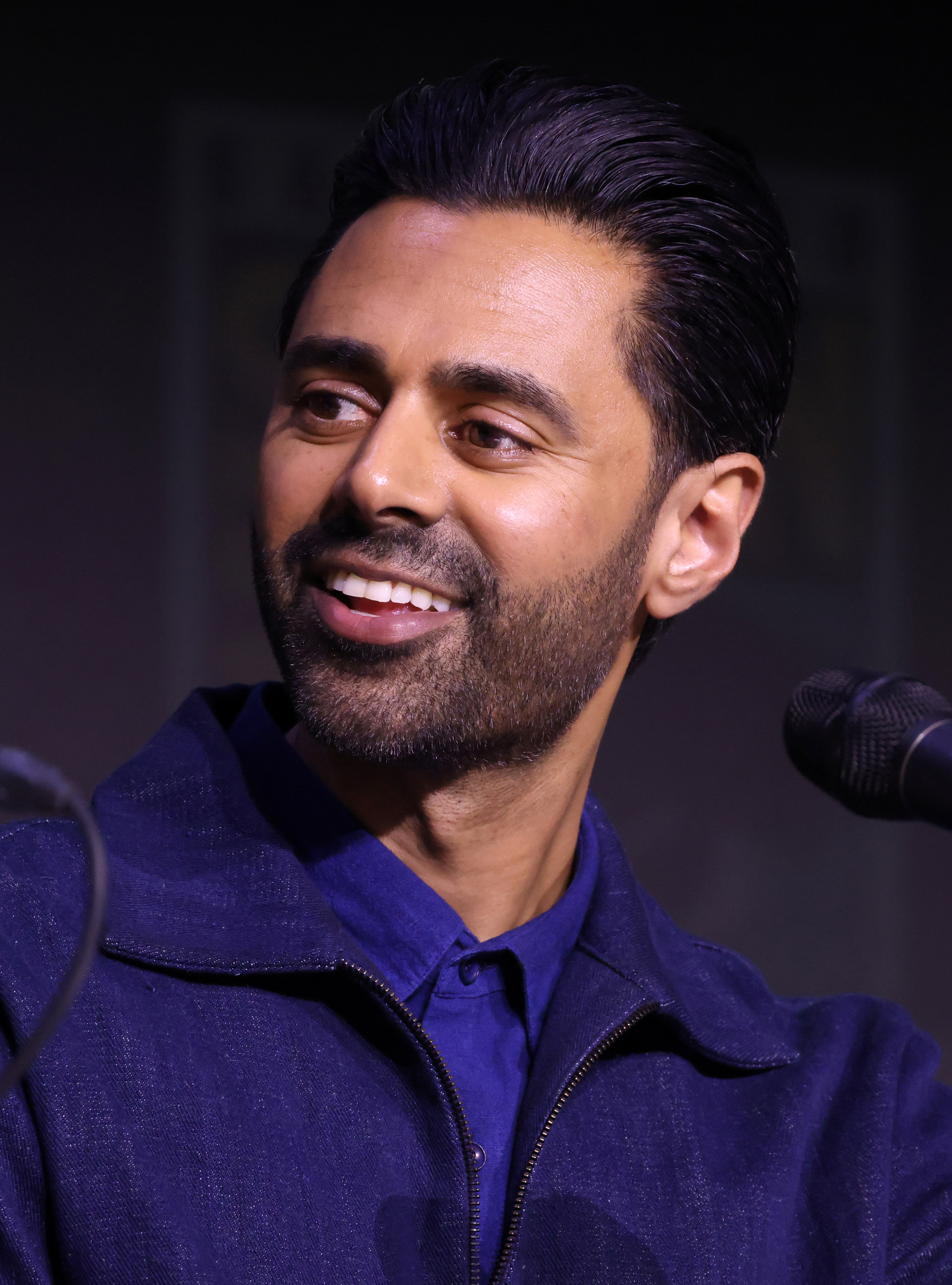
- Minhaj at the 2025 San Diego Comic-Con
- Born: September 23, 1985 (age 41); Davis, California, U.S.
- Education: University of California, Davis (BA)
- Spouse: Beena Patel (m. 2015)
- Children: 2

Comedy career
- Years active: 2008–present
- Medium: Stand-up; television; film
- Genres: Political; news satire; observational comedy; dark comedy; sarcasm; insult comedy; surreal humor
- Subjects: American politics; Indian culture; political punditry; popular culture; current events; mass media/news media; civil rights
- Website: hasanminhaj.com

Hasan Minhaj (/ˈhʌsən ˈmɪnhɑː(d)ʒ/ HUSS-ən MIN-hahzh, -hahj; (Note: The pronunciation /həˈsɑːn mɪˈnɑːdʒ/ hə-SAHN min-AHJ is one variant Minhaj himself has used, for example during his comedy speech at the 2017 White House Correspondents' Dinner. However, in his public life, he has more recently adopted the pronunciation /ˈhʌsən ˈmɪnhɑːdʒ/ HUSS-ən MIN-hahj or /ˈmɪnhɑːʒ/ MIN-hahzh, for example, on his Netflix show Patriot Act with Hasan Minhaj, including in the second season ("Volume 2") episode "Censorship in China" at 0:25-0:35 and 4:05-4:15, and on the Ellen Show in 2019, correcting the host and repeating the pronunciation /ˈmɪnhɑːʒ/ MIN-hahzh multiple times.) born September 23, 1985) is an American comedian and actor. Much of his comedy involves Indian culture and the modern American political landscape through the use of satire, observational comedy and dark comedy. His Netflix series Patriot Act with Hasan Minhaj won an Emmy Award, a Peabody Award, and two Webby Awards. In 2019, he was listed in Time's annual list of the 100 most influential people in the world.

After working as a stand-up comedian and appearing in minor television roles, Minhaj came to prominence for his work on The Daily Show as its senior correspondent from 2014 to 2018. He was the featured speaker at the 2017 White House Correspondents’ Dinner. His first stand-up comedy special, Homecoming King, released on Netflix in May 2017, received positive reviews from critics and won him his first Peabody Award in 2018.

Minhaj left The Daily Show in August 2018 to host a weekly comedy show, Patriot Act with Hasan Minhaj, which debuted on Netflix in October 2018. In April 2019, he won his second Peabody Award for Patriot Act. Minhaj released his second Netflix special, Hasan Minhaj: The King's Jester, in 2022, and appeared in season two of the Apple TV+ drama series The Morning Show in a recurring role.

== Early life ==
Hasan Minhaj was born on September 23, 1985, in Davis, California, to Indian Muslim parents from Aligarh, Uttar Pradesh. His parents, Najme and Seema Minhaj (née Usmani), immigrated to the United States from India. After his birth, he and his father, an organic chemist, remained in the U.S. His mother returned to India for eight years to complete medical school, visiting the U.S. after three years to give birth to his sister in 1989. Minhaj attended Davis Senior High School, graduating in 2003. He graduated from the University of California, Davis, with a Bachelor of Arts degree in political science in 2007.

== Career ==
=== 2004–2013 ===
While in college, he became interested in comedy after seeing Chris Rock's Never Scared (2004), the first stand-up special he watched. He began traveling to San Francisco to perform. In 2008, he won Wild 94.9's "Best Comic Standing" competition, which resulted in his working as an opening act for Katt Williams, Pablo Francisco and Gabriel Iglesias. He also worked part-time for the website Ning, an experience he used to write comedy. Minhaj lists Kevin Shea, W. Kamau Bell and Arj Barker as inspirations.

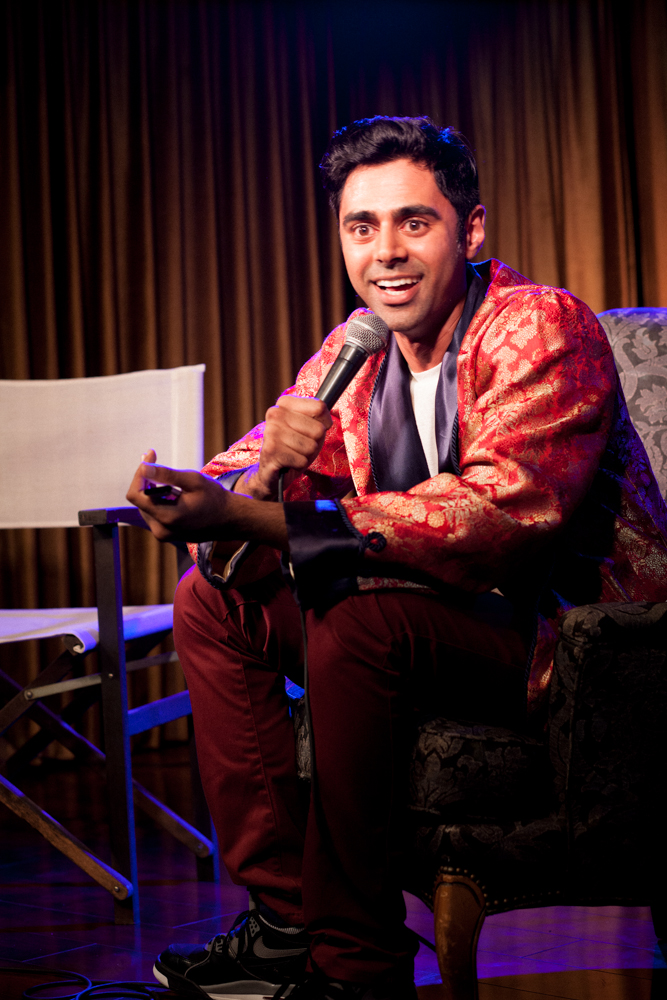
Minhaj performing in 2013.

In 2009, Minhaj moved to Los Angeles to perform on NBC's Stand-up for Diversity, on which he was a finalist. In 2011, he was recurring on the TV sitcom State of Georgia and starred in various roles on the MTV hidden camera show Disaster Date. Through posting on YouTube, he was cast as the host of Failosophy on MTV. In 2013, Minhaj appeared in guest roles on Arrested Development and Getting On. He hosted Stand Up Planet in 2013 and a web series, The Truth with Hasan Minhaj, in 2014. In 2014, he voiced Rabi Ray Rana in the video game Far Cry 4.

=== 2014–2016 ===
On November 19, 2014, Minhaj joined The Daily Show as a correspondent, the last one hired by then-host Jon Stewart. Minhaj was asked to come in for an audition with new material after he sent in a tape of him performing an idea for a Daily Show segment, but he initially panicked as he had no other material prepared. The Friday before Minhaj's audition, Ben Affleck and Bill Maher got into a heated exchange about Islam on Maher's show, and Minhaj used this for a new sketch he called "Batman vs. Bill Maher."

On June 18, 2016, Minhaj performed a set as the host of the annual Radio and Television Correspondents Dinner. The set gained attention for his condemnation of the United States Congress' inaction in passing gun control legislation. On April 29, 2017, Minhaj was the featured speaker at the 2017 White House Correspondents' Dinner, where he took on the traditional role of roasting Washington, D.C. society, national politics, current events, the current president, the Washington press corps and the American media. He criticized U.S. President Donald Trump, who was boycotting the dinner, calling him the "liar in chief," and stating: "Only in America can a second-generation, Indian American Muslim kid get on the stage and make fun of the president." He also reminded the press to do their job, and added: "I want to thank all of you. I want to thank Woodward and Bernstein for inspiring a generation of journalists, and I would like to thank Donald Trump for inspiring the next."

Minhaj's one-man show, Homecoming King, debuted Off-Broadway in October 2015. The show featured a central theme of the immigrant experience in the United States today, illustrated with stories from Minhaj's life as a second-generation Indian-American Muslim. He later turned the show into his first stand-up special, Hasan Minhaj: Homecoming King, which premiered on Netflix on May 23, 2017. The special was filmed at the Mondavi Center at Minhaj's alma mater, UC Davis, in January 2017, and won a television Peabody Award.

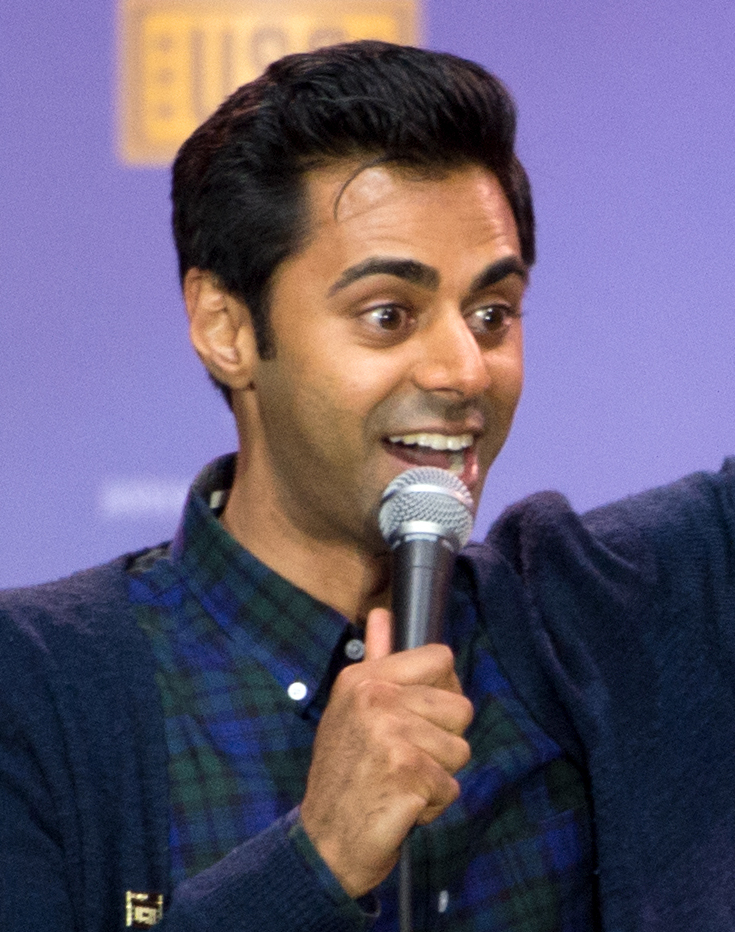
Minhaj performing at the Joint Base Andrews in Washington D.C. in 2016.

=== 2017–2022 ===
In March 2018, Netflix announced that Minhaj would host his own weekly show on the platform. The new show, Patriot Act with Hasan Minhaj, premiered on October 28, 2018. It received an initial order of 32 episodes. Patriot Act explores the modern cultural, political and economic landscape. Some researchers for the show felt Minhaj sidelined them during rewrites, claiming he could be dismissive of fact checkers. Multiple women producers complained of workplace mistreatment, a toxic work environment, and discrimination while on the set, and threatened legal action, which was ultimately settled out of court. In April 2019, Minhaj was listed among TIME's 100 most influential people in the world, and won his second Peabody Award for Patriot Act. In August 2020, Minhaj announced the series would not be renewed after 40 episodes. On November 27, 2018, Comedy Central aired a special titled Goatface, featuring Minhaj, Fahim Anwar, Asif Ali and Aristotle Athari.

In February 2019, Minhaj played on the "Away" roster during the NBA All-Star Celebrity Game at the Bojangles' Coliseum in Charlotte, North Carolina.

In September 2019, he testified during a U.S. House Committee on Financial Services hearing on student loan debt.

On November 13, 2020, it was announced that Minhaj would join season two of the Apple TV+ drama The Morning Show in a recurring role.

In December 2021, Minhaj founded the production company 186K Films, for which he would be the CEO and his frequent collaborator Prashant Venkataramanujam would be Chief Content Officer.

In 2021–2022, Minhaj performed a comedy tour across the United States that culminated in the release of a Netflix special The King's Jester in October 2022. In 2022, Minhaj voiced The Riddler in the first Warner Bros.–Spotify Batman podcast, Batman Unburied.

On October 30, 2022, Minhaj appeared as a contestant on Celebrity Jeopardy!, where his animated and over-the-top reactions earned him the dubious accolade "most annoying contestant ever" by the show's longtime fans.

=== 2023 projects ===
In February 2023, Minhaj returned to The Daily Show as a host. He was among many prominent individuals to serve short stints hosting the show upon the departure of host Trevor Noah. Other hosts include Wanda Sykes, Jordan Klepper, Roy Wood Jr., John Leguizamo and Al Franken. In March 2023, Minhaj hosted the 38th Independent Spirit Awards. The same year, he had a supporting role in the Jennifer Lawrence comedy film No Hard Feelings. In June 2023, it was reported that he helped stage the sequence involving Pavitr Prabhakar in Spider-Man: Across the Spider-Verse alongside its voice actor Karan Soni. In October 2023, he reprised the role of The Riddler in the 2023 podcast The Riddler: Secrets in the Dark.

=== 2023 New Yorker article ===
According to the September 2023 issue of The New Yorker, "Minhaj acknowledged, for the first time, that many of the anecdotes he related in his Netflix specials were untrue" and yet, he contended, "Every story in my style is built around a seed of truth... seventy per cent emotional truth—this happened—and then thirty per cent hyperbole, exaggeration, fiction", which he calls "inherent to the art form". Examples of fabrication included Minhaj's accounts of, as a teenager, being slammed against a car by police after mocking an FBI informant infiltrating his mosque, as well as receiving a threat letter filled with fake anthrax that spilled onto his daughter and then bringing her to a hospital. In reality, a middle-aged man, believed by a teenaged Minhaj to be an FBI informant, "made a show of pushing Minhaj to the ground" during a basketball game. Regarding the anthrax story, while Minhaj was indeed mailed such a letter, his daughter was never hospitalized. Also, he has admitted that his wife added some of her own lines into that story.

The article generated public debate about creative license in stand-up comedy. The following month, Minhaj posted a YouTube video response, apologizing for having disappointed any fans with his artistic choices but also defending those choices as highlighting the broader "emotional truths" of threats to his family, FBI surveillance, and Islamophobia, which Minhaj has worked for years to combat. Minhaj considers the tone of the New Yorker article to be misleading, but he acknowledged:

I thought I had two different expectations built into my work: my work as a storytelling comedian and my work as a political comedian, where facts always come first. That is why the fact-checking on Patriot Act was extremely rigorous. The fact-checking in my congressional testimony, deeply rigorous. But in my work as a storytelling comedian, I assumed the lines between truth and fiction were allowed to be a bit more blurry. And I totally get why a journalist would be interested where that line sits. I just wish the reporter had been more interested in their own premise. Someone genuinely curious about truth in stand-up wouldn't just fact-check my specials. They would fact-check a bunch of specials. They would establish a control group, a baseline, to see how far outside the bounds I was in relation to others. They wouldn't just cherry-pick a few stories.

Some criticism of Minhaj comes from the fact that reviewers previously considered his storytelling genuine enough to be a helpful force in the larger social justice movement. Critics have since argued that his embellishments risk undermining trust in him as a social and political commentator or blurring the line between narrative truth and deception. In his response, Minhaj vowed to be more considerate in future storytelling bits.

=== 2024–present ===
In July 2024, Minhaj launched an ongoing political talk show (on YouTube) and podcast, Hasan Minhaj Doesn't Know. In the first episode, he interviewed Senator Elizabeth Warren, and has since interviewed Stacey Abrams, Senator Bernie Sanders, and Ro Khanna.

In October 2024, Minhaj released his third standup comedy special on Netflix, Off With His Head. In the special, he rebukes criticism from The New Yorker, describing the scandal as "dorky".

In June 2025, it was announced that Minhaj would be performing at Belly Laughs, a new comedy and food festival in Los Angeles.

On July 15, 2025, Minhaj and Ronny Chieng announced Hasan Hates Ronny | Ronny Hates Hasan, a co-headlining North American tour.

== Influences ==
Minhaj has said his comedy influences include Richard Pryor, Dave Chappelle, Trevor Noah, Junot Diaz, Jon Stewart, Chris Rock and Stephen Colbert.

== Personal life and family ==
Minhaj is a Muslim with liberal Islamic beliefs and considers himself "non-dogmatic."

In a 2026 interview, Minhaj spoke about those who influenced his vision of Islam. From them, he included his father, his mother, his grandmother who would get up in the night for the tahajjud prayer, and Malcolm X. He also stated that Islam appeals to him because it combines the legalism and Abrahamic legacy of Christianity and Judaism with the spirituality of the Dharmic faiths.

In January 2015, Minhaj married his longtime partner Beena Patel, whom he met in college. Patel received a Doctor of Public Health in 2013, and has since worked with homeless patients and is a management consultant for MedAmerica. According to Minhaj in his comedy special, The King's Jester, he and his wife dated for ten years before he proposed to her. Minhaj and Patel are both second-generation Indian Americans; she is a Hindu of Gujarati descent, and he is a Muslim of Uttar Pradeshi descent, something he discussed in his comedy special Hasan Minhaj: Homecoming King.

Minhaj and Patel lived in New York City until the pandemic, but have since moved to Greenwich, Connecticut. They have a daughter (born April 2018) and a son (born February 2020).

Minhaj has spoken about his and his wife's struggle to conceive. After his wife convinced him to go to a fertility clinic, it was determined the issue was with his fertility rather than hers. Minhaj underwent a varicocele repair procedure, after discovering there was too much blood in his scrotum. The couple was able to have two children.

In addition to English, Minhaj is fluent in both major registers (Hindi and Urdu) of the Hindustani language. He is a fan of the Sacramento Kings, having grown up nearby. His son had a Kings-themed first birthday party, and he has considered becoming part-owner of the team. In October 2023, he joined Artists4Ceasefire and called for a ceasefire in the Gaza war.

== Filmography ==
=== Film ===
Year	Title	Role	Notes
2017	Rough Night	Joe	
2018	Most Likely to Murder	Amir	
2018	The Spy Who Dumped Me	Topher Duffer	
2019	Dads	Himself	Documentary film
2023	No Hard Feelings	Doug Khan	
2023	Haunted Mansion	Police sketch artist	
2024	Babes	Marty	
2024	It Ends with Us	Marshall	
2025	Tron: Ares	Ajay Singh	
2026	Lucy Schulman	TBA	Post-production
2026	Best of the Best	Hamza Latif	Also co-writer and co-producer

=== Television ===
Year	Title	Role	Notes
2010	The Wanda Sykes Show	WMZ Staffer	Episode: "1.8"
2010	The Legend of Neil	Lynel 2 / Lynel	2 episodes
2011	Disaster Date	Himself	18 episodes
2011	State of Georgia	Seth	5 episodes
2013	Arrested Development	Indian Medical Student	Episode: "A New Start"
2013	Getting On	Raul	Episode: "Nightshift"
2013	Failosophy	Himself (host)	12 episodes
2014–18	The Daily Show	Himself (correspondent)	103 episodes
2016	Radio and Television Correspondents' Dinner	Himself (host)	TV special
2017	White House Correspondents' Dinner	Himself (host)	TV special
2017	Hasan Minhaj: Homecoming King	Himself	Stand-up special
2018	Champions	Ro	Episode: "My Fair Uncle"
2018	The Final Table	Guest judge	Episode: "India"
2018	Comedians in Cars Getting Coffee	Himself (guest)	Episode: "Nobody Cries At A Joke"
2018–20	Patriot Act with Hasan Minhaj	Himself (host)	40 episodes; also co-creator, writer, executive producer
2021	The Morning Show	Eric	Recurring role (season 2)
2022	Celebrity Jeopardy!	Himself	Contestant
2023	The Daily Show	Himself (guest host)	4 episodes (week of Feb 27)
2023	38th Independent Spirit Awards	Himself (host)	Television special
2026	Bollywood Dance U	—N/a	Documentary series; as executive producer

=== Podcasts ===
Year	Title	Role
2022	Batman Unburied	Edward Nygma / Riddler
2023	The Riddler: Secrets in the Dark	Edward Nygma / Riddler
2024	Hasan Minhaj Doesn't Know	Host

=== Video games ===
Year	Title	Voice
2014	Far Cry 4	Rabi Ray Rana (voice)

== Awards and nominations ==
Year	Association	Category	Nominated work	Result	Ref.
2016	Chhaya CDC Award	Architects Of Change Honoree	—N/a	Won	
2017	Teen Choice Award	Choice Comedian	—N/a	Nominated	
2018	Shorty Award	Best in Comedy	The Daily Show	Nominated	
2018	Peabody Awards	Entertainment honoree	Hasan Minhaj: Homecoming King	Won	
2019	Peabody Awards	Entertainment honoree	Patriot Act with Hasan Minhaj	Won	
2019	Time	100 Most Influential People	—N/a	Won	
2019	Webby Awards	Video Entertainment	"Deep Cuts" (Patriot Act with Hasan Minhaj)	Won	
2019	Webby Awards	Special Achievement	Patriot Act with Hasan Minhaj	Won	
2019	Webby Awards	Social Campaign for Television & Film	Patriot Act with Hasan Minhaj	Nominated	

== See also ==
- Improvisational comedy
- Indians in the New York City metropolitan area
